= The Water Margin (1998 TV series) =

1998 Chinese TV series

- Japanese DVD cover art
- Also known as: Outlaws of the Marsh
- 水浒传
- Genre: Costume drama, martial arts
- Based on: Water Margin by Shi Nai'an
- Screenplay by: Yang Zhengguang; Ran Ping; Ren Dahui; Mi Jiecheng
- Directed by: Zhang Shaolin; Lu Tao; Pan Yinlai; Kang Honglei; Guo Daqun; Xing Zhaojun; Li Li; Guo Jin; Luo Shunming
- Starring: Li Xuejian; Zang Jinsheng; Zhou Yemang; Ding Haifeng; Zhao Xiaorui; Wei Zongwan
- Ending theme: "Heroes' Song" (好汉歌) by Liu Huan; "Harmony in Heaven, Earth and Humankind" (天时地利人和) by Peng Liyuan
- Composer: Zhao Jiping
- Country of origin: China
- Original language: Mandarin
- No. of episodes: 43

Production
- Executive producers: Yang Weiguang; Yu Guanghua; Chen Hanyuan; Liu Yiqin; Jia Wenzeng; Hu En; Zou Qingfang
- Producers: Ren Dahui; Zhang Jizhong; Meng Fanyao; Wang Rui; Que Xin; Dou Yanrong; Ma Jian; Wang Hao; Zhao Baoming; Sun Xinyuan
- Production location: China
- Cinematography: Zhang Shaolin; Yu Min; Zhao Xingang; Zhang Zhendong; Zhu Qiang; Gu Fuqun; Zhao Xinchang; Xie Jinfeng; Lang Yanhong; Li Congjun
- Editors: Hong Mei; Chen Xi; Zhang Jing
- Running time: ≈45 minutes per episode
- Production company: CCTV

Original release
- Network: CCTV
- Release: January 1998 – 1998

The Water Margin (水浒传) is a 1998 Chinese television series adapted from the 14th-century classical novel of the same title by Shi Nai'an. Produced by CCTV and first broadcast in mainland China in January 1998, the series also featured action choreography by Yuen Woo-ping. Li Xuejian, Zang Jinsheng, Zhou Yemang, Ding Haifeng and Zhao Xiaorui and others starred as the 108 Heroes while Wei Zongwan portrayed the antagonist Gao Qiu. The ending theme songs were sung by Liu Huan (for the first 30 episodes) and Peng Liyuan (for the last 13 episodes).

The series proved to be deeply controversial among viewers, garnering mixed reviews because its realism required the deletion of most of the heroic-romantic elements of the original work. Some viewers also criticised it for "restoring" the original work's comradely spirit of "drawing one's sword to help one another in times of difficulty" into lawless banditry, and for "constituting a distortion of the original narrative".

== List of episodes ==
| # | Rough translation of title (in English) | Original title (in Chinese) |
|---|---|---|
| 1 | Gao Qiu's rise to prominence | 高俅发迹 |
| 2 | Beating up the Lord of the West | 拳打镇关西 |
| 3 | Creating a disturbance on Mount Wutai | 大闹五台山 |
| 4 | Uprooting a willow tree | 倒拔垂杨柳 |
| 5 | White Tiger Hall | 白虎节堂 |
| 6 | Wild Boars Forest | 野猪林 |
| 7 | Snow and wind at the Temple of the Mountain Deity | 风雪山神庙 |
| 8 | Lin Chong becomes an outlaw | 林冲落草 |
| 9 | Yang Zhi sells a saber | 杨志卖刀 |
| 10 | Gathering of the Seven Stars | 七星聚义 |
| 11 | Robbing the convoy of birthday gifts | 智取生辰纲 |
| 12 | Secretly releasing Heavenly King Chao | 私放晁天王 |
| 13 | Killing Wang Lun | 火并王伦 |
| 14 | Song Jiang kills Yan Poxi | 宋江杀惜 |
| 15 | Jingyang Ridge | 景阳冈 |
| 16 | The brothers are reunited | 兄弟重逢 |
| 17 | Granny Wang stirs up romantic feelings | 王婆弄风情 |
| 18 | Wu Dalang catches the adulterous pair | 武大郎捉奸 |
| 19 | Lion Tower | 狮子楼 |
| 20 | Beating up Jiang the Door God in a drunken state | 醉打蒋门神 |
| 21 | Bloodbath at Mandarin Ducks Tower | 血溅鸳鸯楼 |
| 22 | Qingfeng Fort | 清风寨 |
| 23 | Exiled to Jiangzhou | 发配江洲 |
| 24 | Writing a seditious poem at Xunyang Tower | 浔阳楼题反诗 |
| 25 | Creating a disturbance in Jiangzhou | 闹江州 |
| 26 | Li Kui carries his mother | 李逵背母 |
| 27 | Zhu Family Village (part one) | 祝家庄(上) |
| 28 | Zhu Family Village (part two) | 祝家庄(下) |
| 29 | Breaking the chain-linked cavalry formation | 大破连环马 |
| 30 | Zeng Family Fortress | 曾头市 |
| 31 | Lu Junyi joins Liangshan | 卢俊义上山 |
| 32 | The Grand Assembly | 英雄排座次 |
| 33 | Creating a disturbance in Dongjing during the Yuanxiao Festival | 元夜闹东京 |
| 34 | Yan Qing fights in a leitai match | 燕青打擂 |
| 35 | Li Kui becomes a magistrate | 李逵坐堂 |
| 36 | Stealing wine and tearing the imperial order | 偷酒扯诏 |
| 37 | Defeating Grand Marshal Gao | 大败高太尉 |
| 38 | Amnesty | 招安 |
| 39 | Blood spill at Chenqiao Courier Station | 血洒陈桥驿 |
| 40 | Campaign against Fang La | 征方腊 |
| 41 | Soul departs at Yongjin Gate | 魂系涌金门 |
| 42 | Black Dragon Ridge is tainted with blood | 血染乌龙岭 |
| 43 | Song Jiang's death | 宋江之死 |

== Cast ==
Note: Some cast members played multiple roles. Their roles are separated by a slash.

=== Liangshan heroes ===
- Zhang Zhizhong as Chao Gai
- Li Xuejian as Song Jiang
- Wang Weiguo as Lu Junyi
- Ning Xiaozhi as Wu Yong
- Wang Yonggui as Gongsun Sheng
- Li Zhenqi as Guan Sheng
- Zhou Yemang as Lin Chong
- Wang Wensheng as Qin Ming
- Jia Shitou as Huyan Zhuo
- Xiu Qing as Hua Rong
- Zheng Qiang as Chai Jin
- Yang Zengguang as Zhu Tong
- Zang Jinsheng as Lu Zhishen
- Ding Haifeng as Wu Song
- Di Naishe as Yang Zhi
- Zhang Hao as Suo Chao
- Wang Jiming as Dai Zong
- Tai Zuhui as Liu Tang
- Zhao Xiaorui as Li Kui
- Guo Jun as Shi Jin / Shi Wengong
- Guo Baisong as Lei Heng
- Yang Baoguang as Li Jun
- Liu Weihua as Ruan Xiaoer
- Lan Gongying as Zhang Heng
- Zhang Hengping as Ruan Xiaowu
- Zhang Yakun as Zhang Shun
- Li Dongguo as Ruan Xiaoqi
- Chen Zhihui as Yang Xiong / Wang Jin
- Yang Fan as Shi Xiu
- Kong Qingyuan as Xie Zhen
- Han Fuli as Xie Bao
- Wang Guanghui as Yan Qing
- You Liping as Zhu Wu
- Qi Jingbin as Sun Li
- Zhen Liqiang as Han Tao
- Wang Chunhui as Peng Qi
- Li Wencheng as Pei Xuan
- Yang Lin as Yan Shun
- Xing Feng as An Daoquan
- Xu Jingyi as Wang Ying
- Zheng Shuang as Hu Sanniang
- Zhu Xiaochun as Tong Wei / Li Da
- Wang Zhongwei as Tong Meng
- Liu Liwei as Zheng Tianshou
- Li Baojun as Song Qing
- Zhao Chunming as Cao Zheng
- Hu Longyin as Song Wan
- Qian Weidong as Du Qian
- Chang Yuping as Shi En
- Zhang Lianzhong as Zhu Gui
- Cheng Sihan as Zhu Fu
- Xing Guozhou as Cai Fu / Xue Ba
- Chen Changlong as Cai Qing
- Wei Feng as Jiao Ting
- Zhang Weiguo as Sun Xin
- Zhang Xiuyan as Gu Dasao
- Zhang Xin as Zhang Qing
- Liang Li as Sun Erniang
- Sun Yueming as Bai Sheng
- Meng Gengcheng as Shi Qian

=== Others ===
- Zeng Hongsheng as Emperor Huizong
- Tang Guoqiang as Su Shi
- He Qing as Li Shishi
- Wei Zongwan as Gao Qiu
  - Xiu Ge as young Gao Qiu
- Hong Jiantao as Gao Yanei
- Ma Xin as Gao Lian
- Lin Liankun as Cai Jing
- Quan Jiefang as Cai Jiu
- Li Xiaoding as Liu Menglong
- Lei Kesheng as Tong Guan
- Hu Qingshi as Liang Shijie
- Zou Jianzhong as Huang Wenbing
- Wu Liping as "Yuhou" Li
- Cui Dai as Fang La
- Dong Chuanqiang as Fang Mao
- Xu Jian as Fang Tianding
- Wu Song as Pang Wanchun
- Bai Junjie as Luan Tingyu, Zhu Hu
- Jin Guangsheng as Zhu Long
- Li Yusheng as Zhu Biao
- Xie Jiaqi as Zeng Tu / Zeng Suo
- Liu Qiang as Zeng Shen
- Li Shulong as Zeng Sheng
- Guo Jie as Zeng Nong
- Chen Lizhong as Wang Jin's mother
- Yu Yuexian as Jin Cuilian
- Yang Zhaoquan as Jin Cuilian's father / old depot keeper
- Li Lanfa as Butcher Zheng
- Zhang Hongying as Squire Zhao
- Gu Jinshui as Zhizhen
- Xu Fulai as Abbot
- Zhao Yunsheng as Zhiqing / Zhao Silang / Squire Cao
- Xu Chao as Abbot
- Sun Mingyue as Zhang San
- Wang Quanyou as Lu Qian
- Wang Jinghua as Lin Chong's wife
- Yang Dong as Jin'er
- Liu Wei as Fu'an
- Zhang Guiyi as Instructor Zhang
- Song Chunlin as Kaifeng magistrate
- Xu Ming as Sun Ding
- Li Yan as Dong Chao
- Chen Jimin as Instructor Hong
- Zhao Yanmin as Wang Lun
- Li Qi as Niu Er
- Hao Liping as Liang Shijie's wife
- Huang Zongluo as Yuncheng magistrate
- Yang Meng as He Tao
- Kang Honglei as He Qing
- Yuan Yuhua as Yan Po
- Mu Qing as Yan Poxi
- Chuo Eryong as Zhang Wenyuan
- Ren Dahui as Song Jiang's father
- Song Wenhua as Wu Dalang
- Brenda Wang as Pan Jinlian
- Li Qiang as Ximen Qing
- Li Mingqi as Granny Wang
- Guo Chunhua as Yanggu magistrate
- Wang Su as Yao Erlang
- Xu Yuting as He Jiu
- Deli Ge'er as Jiang the Door God
- Liu Hongmei as Jiang's wife
- Wang Wenyou as Inspector Zhang
- Jiang Jingyu as Zhang's wife
- Liu Yanfeng as Yulan
- Li Lianyi as Liu Gao
- Cui Honghong as Liu Gao's wife
- Lei Dan as Li Gui
- Wu Yujin as Li Gui's wife
- Song Xiuchun as Li Kui's mother
- Niu Li as Pan Qiaoyun
- Liu Xiaoxi as Pei Ruhai
- Zhang Fen as Xu Ning's wife
- Li Zhiyi as Su Yuanjing
- Bi Yuanjin as Li Gu
- Wang Qinzhen as Lu Junyi's wife
- Zhang Chunyan as Pang Qiuxia
- Ni Zengzhao as Ren Yuan
- Zheng Danian as Chen Zongshan
- Zhu Lei as Zhang Ganban
- Wang Xingchi as He Cheng
- Zhang Hongjie as Zhang Shuye
- Pan Yinlai as Hu Cheng
- Zhang Jizhong as Cui Jing

== Music ==
The music for the series was composed by Zhao Jiping.

| # | Track title | Artist | Notes |
|---|---|---|---|
| 1 | "Heroes' Song" 好汉歌 | Liu Huan | One of the ending theme songs |
| 2 | "Harmony in Heaven, Earth and Humankind" 天时地利人和 | Peng Liyuan | One of the ending theme songs |
| 3 | "Wang Jin beats Gao Qiu" 王进打高俅 | | Played during fight scenes |
| 4 | "Lin Chong's Night Journey" 林冲夜奔 | | Played during the last part of episode 7 and some death scenes |
| 5 | "Song of the Magpie Bridge" 鹊桥曲 | Chen Junhua | Sung by Li Shishi in episode 38 |
| 6 | "Battle of Life and Death" 殊死一战 | | Played during battle scenes |
| 7 | "Evening Drums and Morning Bells" 暮鼓晨钟 | | Played during monastery scenes |
| 8 | "The Water Margin" 水浒风云 | | Played during the scene in episode 8 when Lin Chong enters Liangshan Marsh |
| 9 | "Brotherhood" 兄弟情谊 | | Played during light-hearted moments between the Liangshan heroes |
| 10 | "Palace Dance" 宫廷舞影 | | Played during palace scenes |
| 11 | "Heroes of Mount Liang" 梁山好汉 | | Played during celebration scenes |
| 12 | "Restaurant in Jiangzhou" 江州酒楼 | Yang Yaping | Played during episode 23 at the restaurant scene |
| 13 | "The River is Red" 满江红 | Dai Jianmin | Sung by Zhu Wu in episode 33 |
| 14 | "Justice Exists in the World" 公道在人间 | Liu Huan | Played during the victory scene in episode 37 |

== See also ==
- The Water Margin (film)
- The Water Margin (1973 TV series)
- Outlaws of the Marsh (TV series)
- All Men Are Brothers (TV series)
