= Xie Bao =

Fictional character in the Chinese classical novel Water Margin

- Water Margin character
- A Qing dynasty illustration of Xie Bao
- First appearance: Chapter 49

In-universe information
- Nicknames: "Twin-tailed Scorpion" 雙尾蠍
- Weapon: bronze-alloy fork (渾鐵點鋼叉)
- Origin: hunter
- Designation: Infantry Commander of Liangshan
- Rank: 35th, Crying Star (天哭星) of the 36 Heavenly Spirits
- Ancestral home / Place of origin: Dengzhou (around present-day Penglai, Shandong)

Chinese names
- Simplified Chinese: 解宝
- Traditional Chinese: 解寶
- Pinyin: Xiè Bǎo
- Wade–Giles: Hsieh Pao

Xie Bao is a fictional character in Water Margin, one of the Classic Chinese Novels. Nicknamed "Twin-tailed Scorpion", he ranks 35th among the 36 Heavenly Spirits, the first third of the 108 Heroes.

== Historical basis ==
Historians theorise that Xie Bao was inspired by a historical figure with a similar name. This theory particularly relies on the 13th-century text The Compilation of the Northern Alliance in Three Reigns (三朝北盟會編) by Xu Mengshen. The text recorded that the historical Xie Bao, who was from Jizhou, was involved in a rebellion against the Song dynasty in 1129. In response to the rebellion, Emperor Gaozong sent the general Han Shizhong to suppress the rebellion led by Xie Bao and others. This record fuelled speculation by historian and textual critic Wang Liqi that the historical rebel was the inspiration for the fictional outlaw. However, other historians like Wang Yu and Li Dianyuan expressed their scepticism towards Wang Liqi's theory of this legend-history fusion for lacking supporting evidence to prove that the historical Xie Bao fled from Dengzhou to Jeju as the supposed evidence that the historical rebel was indeed the inspiration for the fictional outlaw.

== Background ==
Xie Zhen and Xie Bao, attributed to Du Jin

The novel describes Xie Bao as a seven chi-tall and dark-complexioned man with a round face. Each of his ankles is tattooed with a flying yaksha. Nicknamed "Twin-tailed Scorpion", he is well-trained in martial arts, adept at traversing mountainous terrain, and capable of adapting to various climates. He usually wears the hide of a tiger or a leopard as an outer garment, and carries a bronze-alloy fork as his weapon. His elder brother, Xie Zhen, is also a highly-skilled hunter.

== Running into trouble with Squire Mao ==
The Xie brothers, as the best hunters in Dengzhou (登州; around present-day Penglai, Shandong), are ordered by the governor to, within three days, hunt down a ferocious tiger preying on travellers at a ridge.

On the second night, the brothers manage to corner the tiger at a cliff and fire poisoned arrows at the beast. The tiger falls off the cliff to its death and ends up in the backyard of the residence of the wealthy Squire Mao. While the Xie brothers are making their way down the cliff, Mao has sent his son to deliver the dead tiger to the prefecture office and claim the reward.

When the Xie brothers show up at the Mao residence for the tiger, they are accused of theft, taken captive by Mao's servants, and sent to the governor, who has them thrown into prison. Mao then bribes the prison warden to have the Xie brothers murdered in prison.

== Becoming an outlaw ==
Yue He, the jailer assigned to keep watch over the Xie brothers in prison, is distantly related by marriage to them: his elder sister married Sun Li, whose younger brother Sun Xin is married to the Xie brothers' cousin, Gu Dasao.

Yue He alerts Gu Dasao and Sun Xin to the Xie brothers' plight, after which they pressure Sun Li to join them in their plan to raid the prison and save the brothers. The group also enlists the aid of the outlaws Zou Yuan and Zou Run, an uncle–nephew duo from Laizhou.

On the night of the prison raid, Yue He secretly lets Gu Dasao into the prison under the pretence of delivering food to prisoners. While Gu Dasao works with the others to wreak havoc inside and outside the prison, Yue He takes advantage of the chaos to free the Xie brothers. After the raid is over, they join the Xie brothers in taking revenge by slaughtering Squire Mao and his family. Following that, the group decides to head to Liangshan Marsh to join the outlaw band there.

== Battle against the Zhu Family Village ==
Before formally joining the Liangshan outlaws, the group decides to prove themselves by helping the outlaws destroy the Zhu Family Village, a fortified village run by the three Zhu brothers and their father, who have been very hostile towards the Liangshan outlaws. Previously, the outlaws have launched two assaults on the village but failed to overcome the defences.

Sun Li, who was trained by the same martial arts master as Luan Tingyu, the village's resident martial arts instructor, volunteers to make use of his acquaintance with Luan to infiltrate the village and carry out an espionage mission for Liangshan. The Xie brothers, along with Gu Dasao, Sun Xin, Yue He, and the Zous, accompany Sun Li on the mission. The Zhus and Luan Tingyu are initially suspicious when Sun Li and his group show up and claim to have come to help them fight the Liangshan outlaws. However, they trust the newcomers after Sun Li apparently defeats and captures Liangshan's Shi Xiu in a duel on horseback.

Sun Li and his group ultimately complete their mission successfully, allowing the outlaws to overrun the village on their third assault. After that, the group formally becomes part of the Liangshan outlaw band.

== Campaigns and death ==
The Xie brothers are appointed as commanders of the Liangshan infantry after the 108 Heroes are fully assembled. They participate in the campaigns against the Liao invaders and rebel forces in Song territory after the outlaws receive amnesty from Emperor Huizong.

During the final campaign against Fang La's rebel forces, the Xie brothers disguise themselves as hunters to scout the terrain for Liangshan forces at Black Dragon Ridge (烏龍嶺; northeast of present-day Meicheng Town, Jiande, Zhejiang). While climbing up the steep cliff, they are discovered by enemy soldiers, who hurl grappling hooks at them. Ensnared by the hooks, Xie Zhen cuts the connecting ropes and plunges to his death. Shortly after, Xie Bao is crushed to death by the boulders and other debris thrown down the cliff.

== See also ==
- List of Water Margin minor characters for a list of supporting minor characters from Xie Bao's story
