= Yue He =

Fictional character in the Chinese classical novel Water Margin

- Water Margin character
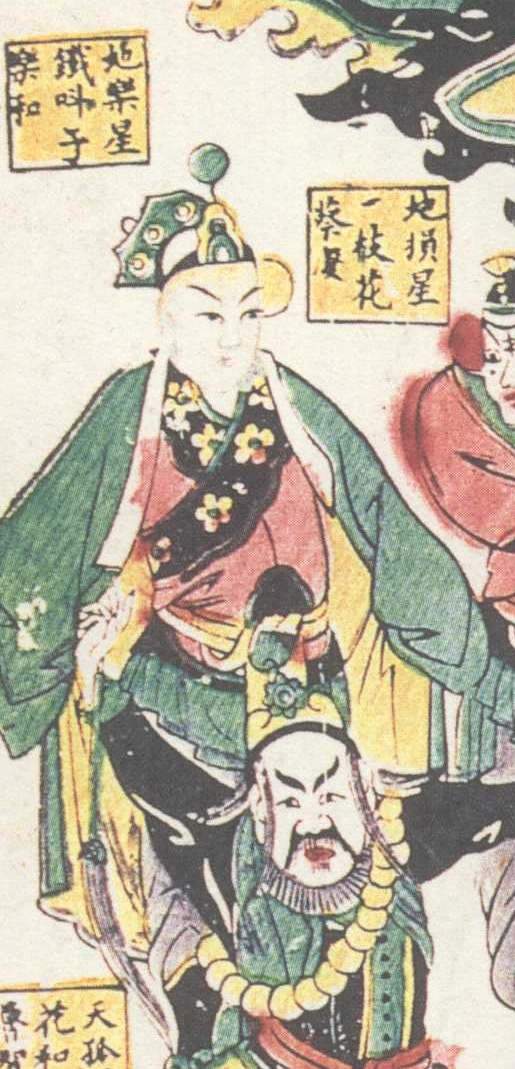
- a Qing dynasty illustration of Yue He
- First appearance: Chapter 49

In-universe information
- Nickname: "Iron Whistle" 鐵叫子
- Origin: jailer
- Designation: Infantry Commander of Liangshan
- Rank: 77th, Music Star (地樂星) of the 72 Earthly Fiends
- Ancestral home / Place of origin: Maozhou (present-day Changyi, Shandong)

Chinese names
- Simplified Chinese: 乐和
- Traditional Chinese: 樂和
- Pinyin: Yuè Hé
- Wade–Giles: Yüeh He

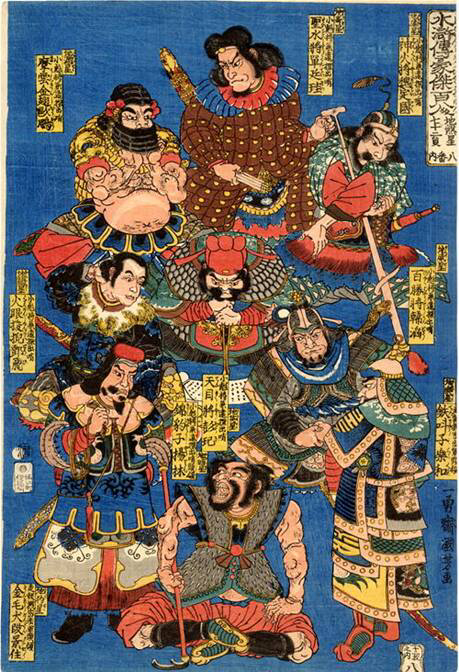
An illustration of nine of the 108 Heroes by Utagawa Kuniyoshi. Peng Qi is in the centre. The rest are (clockwise from top): Shan Tinggui, Wei Dingguo, Han Tao, Yue He, Yang Lin, Duan Jingzhu, Deng Fei, and Ou Peng.

Yue He is a fictional character in Water Margin, one of the Classic Chinese Novels. Nicknamed "Iron Whistle", he ranks 77th among the 108 Heroes and 41st among the 72 Earthly Fiends.

== Background ==
The novel describes Yue He as a good-looking, highly sociable, and musically inclined man who sings well and plays various instruments. He is also well-trained in martial arts. Originally from Maozhou (茅州; present-day Changyi, Shandong), he lives in Dengzhou (登州; around present-day Penglai, Shandong), where he works as a jailer in the prefecture prison. His elder sister is married to Sun Li, who serves as a military officer in Dengzhou.

== Becoming an outlaw ==
When the brothers Xie Zhen and Xie Bao run into trouble with the law and get thrown into prison, Yue He is assigned to keep watch over them. He sympathises with the brothers as he knows they have been framed for theft by the wealthy Squire Mao, who has also bribed the prison warden to have the brothers murdered in prison. Besides, he is distantly related by marriage to the Xie brothers: his elder sister married Sun Li, whose younger brother Sun Xin is married to the Xie brothers' cousin, Gu Dasao.

Yue He alerts Gu Dasao and Sun Xin to the Xie brothers' plight, after which they pressure Sun Li to join them in their plan to raid the prison and save the brothers. The group also enlists the aid of the outlaws Zou Yuan and Zou Run, an uncle–nephew duo from Laizhou.

On the night of the prison raid, Yue He secretly lets Gu Dasao into the prison under the pretence of delivering food to prisoners. While Gu Dasao works with the others to wreak havoc inside and outside the prison, Yue He takes advantage of the chaos to free the Xie brothers. After the raid is over, they join the Xie brothers in taking revenge by slaughtering Squire Mao and his family. Following that, the group decides to head to Liangshan Marsh to join the outlaw band there.

== Battle against the Zhu Family Village ==
Before formally joining the Liangshan outlaws, the group decides to prove themselves by helping the outlaws destroy the Zhu Family Village, a fortified village run by the three Zhu brothers and their father, who have been very hostile towards the Liangshan outlaws. Previously, the outlaws have launched two assaults on the village but failed to overcome the defences.

Sun Li, who was trained by the same martial arts master as Luan Tingyu, the village's resident martial arts instructor, volunteers to make use of his acquaintance with Luan to infiltrate the village and carry out an espionage mission for Liangshan. Yue He, along with Gu Dasao, Sun Xin, the Xie brothers and the Zous, accompanies Sun Li on the mission. The Zhus and Luan Tingyu are initially suspicious when Sun Li and his group show up and claim to have come to help them fight the Liangshan outlaws. However, they trust the newcomers after Sun Li apparently defeats and captures Liangshan's Shi Xiu in a duel on horseback.

Sun Li and his group ultimately complete their mission successfully, allowing the outlaws to overrun the village on their third assault. After that, the group formally becomes part of the Liangshan outlaw band.

== Life at Liangshan ==
Yue He is appointed as a commander of the Liangshan infantry after the 108 Heroes are fully assembled. His task is to deliver intelligence reports to and fro the frontline.

When Gao Qiu leads government forces to attack Liangshan, the outlaws defeat the enemy and capture Gao himself. Song Jiang, the Liangshan outlaws' chief, releases Gao Qiu as a gesture of goodwill as he hopes that Emperor Huizong will grant all the outlaws amnesty and give them a chance to serve the ruling Song dynasty. Yue He and Xiao Rang are sent by Song Jiang to accompany Gao Qiu back to the capital to meet the emperor.

Although Gao Qiu had earlier agreed to help the outlaws convey their wish for amnesty to the emperor, he breaks his promise upon returning to the capital, and detains Yue He and Xiao Rang in his residence. However, the outlaws have sent Dai Zong and Yan Qing to secretly keep a close eye on Gao Qiu. Dai Zong and Yan Qing break into Gao Qiu's residence and extricate Yue He and Xiao Rang.

== Campaigns and later life ==
Despite facing setbacks along the way, the Liangshan outlaws eventually receive amnesty from the emperor with the help of the courtesan Li Shishi and other government officials. The emperor then sends them on campaigns against the Liao invaders and rebel forces in Song territory. Yue He participates in the campaigns and makes contributions in battle.

Before the Liangshan heroes go on their last campaign against Fang La's rebel forces, Yue He is summoned to the capital Dongjing (東京; present-day Kaifeng, Henan). It turns out that a prince consort, who is known for being a connoisseur of fine arts, has heard of Yue He's musical talent and has specifically sought permission from the emperor to keep Yue He as a minstrel in his residence. Yue He thus spends the rest of his life leading a comfortable life in the prince consort's house.
