= The Water Margin (1973 TV series) =

1973 Japanese TV series

- English title card
- Genre: Costume drama, martial arts
- Based on: Water Margin by Shi Nai'an
- Starring: Atsuo Nakamura; Sanae Tsuchida; Kei Satō; Isamu Nagato
- Theme music composer: Masaru Sato
- Country of origin: Japan
- No. of seasons: 2
- No. of episodes: 26

Production
- Running time: 45 minutes per episode

Original release
- Network: Nippon Television
- Release: 1973 – 1974

The Water Margin is a Japanese television series based on the 14th-century book Water Margin, one of the Four Great Classical Novels of Chinese literature. Made in two seasons of 13 episodes each by Nippon Television it was shown in Japan in 1973 and 1974 as 水滸伝 (Hepburn: Suikoden).

The novel details the trials and tribulations of 108 outlaws during the Song Dynasty. This adaptation follows Lin Chung (Atsuo Nakamura) and his clashes with the local government official Kao Chiu (Kei Satō).

For an English-language version, it was adapted by David Weir without translations, using only brief plot synopses. The dubbed version, narrated by Burt Kwouk, was shown by the BBC from 1976 to 1978. An English novelisation, written by Weir, was released in 1978 as Water Margin.

== Episodes ==
=== Series 1 ===
No.	Title	Original release date
1	"Nine dozen heroes and one wicked man"	21 September 1976
2	"None ever escape alive"	28 September 1976
3	"Both at last will reach the sea"	5 October 1976
4	"Ever busy are the gods of love"	12 October 1976
5	"A Treasure of gold and jade"	19 October 1976
6	"Bandits who steal are executed"	26 October 1976
7	"How easy to die, how hard to live"	2 November 1976
8	"A man's only happiness"	9 November 1976
9	"A dutiful son and the love of a brother"	16 November 1976
10	"Escape is not freedom"	23 November 1976
11	"The girl who loved the flower priest"	20 September 1977
12	"Kao Chiu loses his heart"	27 September 1977
13	"When Liang Shan Po robbed the poor"	4 October 1977

=== Series 2 ===
No.	Title	Original release date
1	"A death for love, more deaths from greed"	11 October 1977
2	"The bravest tiger is first killed"	18 October 1977
3	"Heaven aims the master's arrow"	25 October 1977
4	"The traps of love and hate"	1 November 1977
5	"A foolish sage who got involved"	8 November 1977
6	"Mourn the slaughter of so many"	15 November 1977
7	"The war to end all wars"	22 November 1977
8	"Death of a great man"	29 November 1977
9	"Lin Chung is beaten"	6 December 1977
10	"A concubine's dowry"	13 December 1977
11	"Liang Shan Po and the millionaire"	20 December 1977
12	"Knight of the long sword"	27 December 1977
13	"The dynasty of Kao"	3 January 1978

== Home video ==
In the UK a DVD box set of both series was released by Fabulous Films in 2005. This was of a censored version broadcast before the watershed by the BBC in the early 1980s. In 2016 the series was reissued on DVD and Blu-ray with missing portions reinserted that were included in the original 1970s post-watershed broadcast. All UK releases only contain the English dubbed soundtrack.

In Germany a DVD box set was issued by Alive AG in 2008, followed by deluxe and basic Blu-ray sets in 2016 and 2017. As with the UK the series was also originally broadcast in a dubbed version, but all German DVD and Blu-ray releases have also included optional original Japanese audio with German subtitles. In its native Japan, the series was issued in a DVD box set in 2008.

== Cast ==
- Atsuo Nakamura : Lin Chong
- Kei Satō : Gao Qiu
- Sanae Tsuchida : Hu Sanniang
- Tetsuro Tamba : Huyan Zhuo
- So Yamamura : Lu Junyi
- Takahiro Tamura : Chai Jin
- Go Wakabayashi : Guan Sheng
- Takeshi Obayashi : Song Jiang
- Hajime Hana : Wu Song
- Atsushi Watanabe : Ruan Xiaoqi
- Isao Yamagata : Chao Gai
- Toshio Kurosawa : Dai Zong
- Teruhiko Aoi : Shi Jin
- Makoto Sato : Yang Zhi
- Ryōhei Uchida : Zhu Wu
- Toru Abe : Tseng Lung
- Susumu Kurobe : Zhu Biao
- Nobuo Kawai : Huang Wen-Ping
- Isamu Nagato : Lu Zhishen
- Yutaka Mizutani : Emperor Huizong of Song

=== English voices ===
- Michael McClain - Lin Chong (Note: Renamed Lin Chung in English version.)
- Miriam Margolyes - Hu Sanniang
- Peter Marinker - Gao Qiu (Note: Renamed Kao Chiu in English version.)
- Elizabeth Proud
- Trevor Martin
- John Blythe
- David Blagden
- Seán Barrett
- David Collings
- Brian Haines
- Simon Lack
- Rupert Davies
- Frank Duncan
- George Little
- Peter Hawkins
- Robert Rietti
- John Woodvine
- John Nolan
- Ian Thompson
- Nicolette McKenzie
- Cecile Chevreau
- John Carson
- Hugh Dickson
- Harold Reese
- Peter Jeffrey
- John Hollis
- Michael Kilgarriff
- Cyril Shaps
- Daniel Flynn
- Garard Green
- Paul Meier
- Douglas Blackwell
- Garfield Morgan
- Denys Hawthorne
- Eric Flynn

== See also ==
- The Water Margin (film) – 1972 Hong Kong version
- Outlaws of the Marsh (TV series)
- The Water Margin (1998 TV series)
- All Men Are Brothers (TV series)
