= Sun Li (Water Margin) =

Fictional character in the Chinese classical novel Water Margin

- Water Margin character
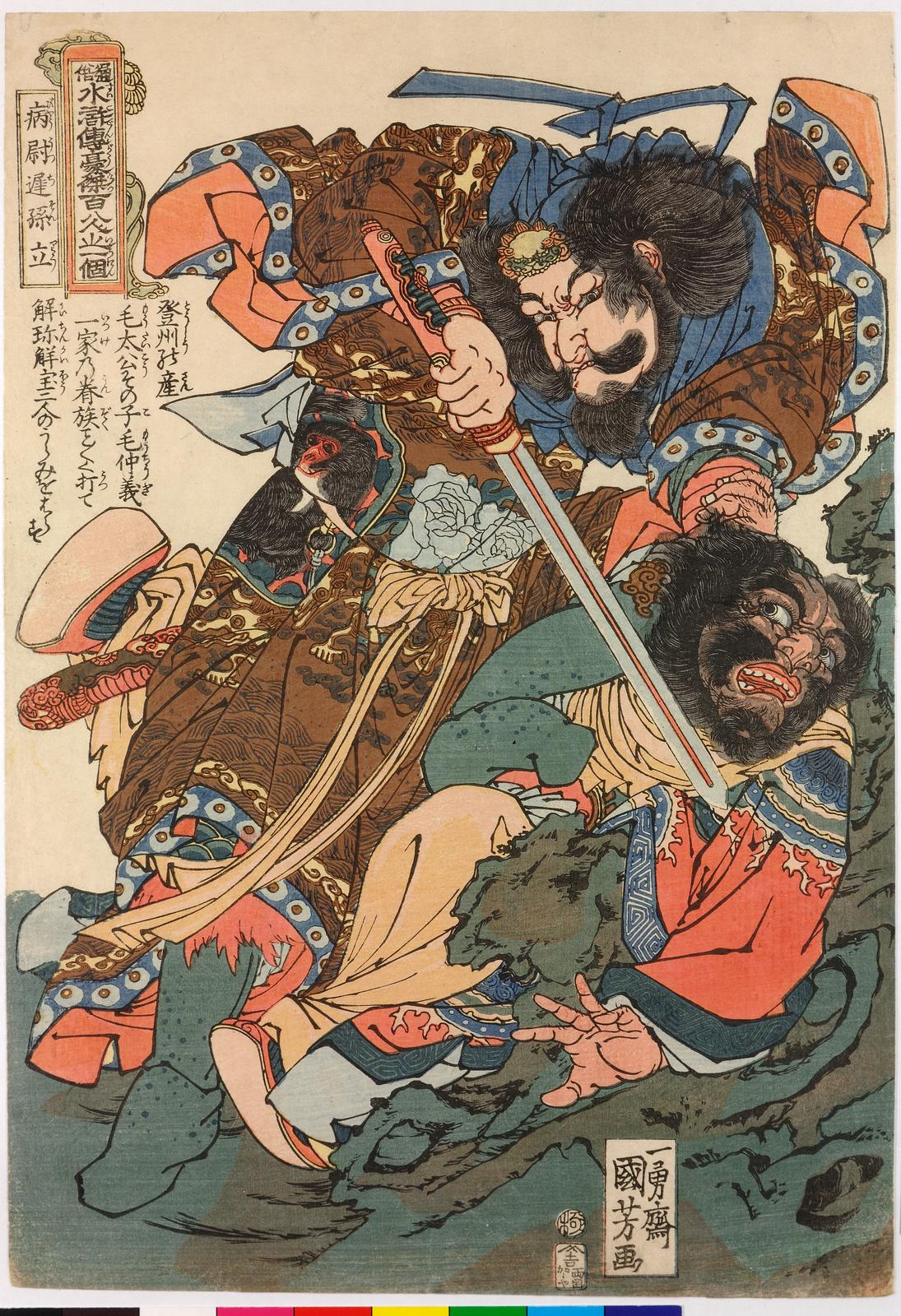
- an illustration of Sun Li (above) about to slit an opponent's throat by Utagawa Kuniyoshi
- First appearance: Chapter 33

In-universe information
- Nicknames: "Sick (Note: 病, which means "sick", is a homonym of 並, which means "to be comparable or equivalent to". Sun Li's nickname can thus be understood to mean "Equivalent/Comparable to Yuchi (Gong)".) Yuchi" 病尉遲
- Weapon: spear, steel club
- Origin: military officer
- Designation: Tiger Cub Patrol Commander of Liangshan
- Rank: 39th, Brave Star (地勇星) of the 72 Earthly Fiends
- Ancestral home / Place of origin: Qiongzhou (present-day Hainan)

Chinese names
- Simplified Chinese: 孙立
- Traditional Chinese: 孫立
- Pinyin: Sūn Lì
- Wade–Giles: Sun Li

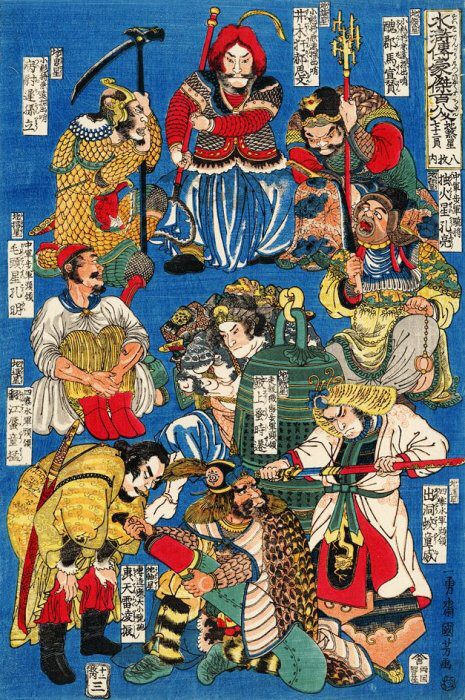
An illustration of nine of the 108 Heroes by Utagawa Kuniyoshi. Clockwise from top: Hao Siwen, Xuan Zan, Kong Liang, Shi Qian, Tong Wei, Ling Zhen, Tong Meng, Kong Ming, and Sun Li.

Sun Li is a fictional character in Water Margin, one of the Classic Chinese Novels. Nicknamed "Sick Yuchi", he ranks 39th among the 108 Heroes and third among the 72 Earthly Fiends.

== Background ==
The novel describes Sun Li as an eight chi-tall man with jet-black eyes and a broad face studded with whiskers. A highly-skilled warrior adept in a wide range of weapons, he usually fights with a spear in one hand and a steel club in the other. As he resembles the Tang dynasty general Yuchi Gong in appearance and uses a similar weapon, he is nicknamed "Sick Yuchi".

Originally from Qiongzhou (瓊州; present-day Hainan), Sun Li lives in Dengzhou (登州; around present-day Penglai, Shandong), where he serves as a military officer under the governor. His younger brother "Little Yuchi" Sun Xin runs a tavern in Dengzhou with his wife Gu Dasao. Sun Li's wife is also the elder sister of Yue He, who works a jailer in the Dengzhou prison.

== Becoming an outlaw ==
Sun Li is first introduced in the novel when he is approached by Sun Xin and Gu Dasao to join them in carrying out a prison raid in Dengzhou to rescue Gu Dasao's cousins, the brothers Xie Zhen and Xie Bao, who have been framed for theft and wrongfully imprisoned. Initially reluctant to participate in their plan, Sun Li is forced to do so after his brother and sister-in-law threaten to sever ties with him and fight him if he refuses. The three of them also enlist the help of Yue He and the outlaws Zou Yuan and Zou Run, an uncle–nephew duo from Laizhou.

On the night of the prison raid, Yue He secretly lets Gu Dasao into the prison under the pretence of delivering food to prisoners. While Gu Dasao works with the Sun brothers and the others to wreak havoc inside and outside the prison, Yue He takes advantage of the chaos to free the Xie brothers. After the raid is over, they join the Xie brothers in taking revenge by slaughtering those responsible for their plight. Following that, the group decides to head to Liangshan Marsh to join the outlaw band there.

== Battle against the Zhu Family Village ==
Before formally joining Liangshan, the group decides to prove themselves by helping the outlaws destroy the Zhu Family Village, a fortified village run by the three Zhu brothers and their father, who have been very hostile towards the Liangshan outlaws. Previously, the outlaws have launched two assaults on the village but failed to overcome the defences.

Sun Li, who was trained by the same martial arts master as Luan Tingyu, the village's resident martial arts instructor, volunteers to make use of his acquaintance with Luan to infiltrate the village and carry out an espionage mission for Liangshan. Gu Dasao, Sun Xin, the Xie brothers, and the Zous accompany Sun Li on the mission. The Zhus and Luan Tingyu are initially suspicious when Sun Li and his group show up and claim to have come to help them fight the Liangshan outlaws. However, they trust the newcomers after Sun Li apparently defeats and captures Liangshan's Shi Xiu in a duel on horseback.

Sun Li and his group ultimately complete their mission successfully, allowing the outlaws to overrun the village on their third assault. After that, the group formally becomes part of the Liangshan outlaw band.

== Campaigns and later life ==
Sun Li is appointed as a Tiger Cub Patrol Commander of the Liangshan cavalry after the 108 Heroes are fully assembled. He participates in the campaigns against the Liao invaders and rebel forces in Song territory after the outlaws receive amnesty from Emperor Huizong.

Sun Li is among the few Liangshan heroes who survive all the campaigns. To honour him for his contributions during the campaigns, the emperor awards him the title "Martial Gentleman of Grace" (武奕郎) and reinstates him as a military officer in Dengzhou.

== Other appearances ==
In Iron Arm, Golden Sabre, Sun Li is trained in martial arts by Tan Zhengfan, a Shaolin martial artist who also trained Zhou Tong and Luan Tingyu. Zhou Tong later becomes a martial arts instructor of the imperial guards in Kaifeng, and uses his influence to help Sun Li get the position of a military officer in Dengzhou.
