= Sanae Tsuchida =

Japanese actress (born 1949)

Sanae Tsuchida (土田 早苗, Tsuchida Sanae) is a Japanese actress. She was born on July 26, 1949, in Toyonaka, Osaka.

In film, Tsuchida had a role in Kore ga Seishun Da! (1966). In another modern role (1976), she appeared in the Norifumi Suzuki film Torakku Yarō: Hōkyō Ichiban Hoshi. The year 1979 saw her in a film based on the television series she had been in: Onmitsu dōshin Ōedo sōsamō.

Tsuchida has appeared in major roles in many prime-time television series. She starred as Kagari, playing opposite Asahi Kurizuka in the 42-episode 1967–68 black-and-white jidaigeki series Kaze on the Tokyo Broadcasting System network. She had a leading role as Inazuma Oryū in Ōedo Sōsamō. From 1970 to 1975, she appeared as Chiharu in Ōoka Echizen, and from 1970 to 1973 as Oyumi in Zenigata Heiji, with kabuki actor Hashizō Ōkawa as the title character. Leaving the Edo period, she played Itoko in the daytime drama series Akantare (1976–77). Tsuchida starred as well as Hu San-Niang in the 1973 series, The Water Margin. In addition to series, she has also been cast in numerous guest-star roles, among them Abarenbō Shōgun.

Tsuchida has also appeared on stage, in variety and quiz shows, and in commercials.

== Sources ==
This article incorporates material from 土田早苗 (Tsuchida Sanae) in the Japanese Wikipedia, retrieved June 6, 2008.
