= Sun Xin (Water Margin) =

Fictional character in the Chinese classical novel Water Margin

- Water Margin character
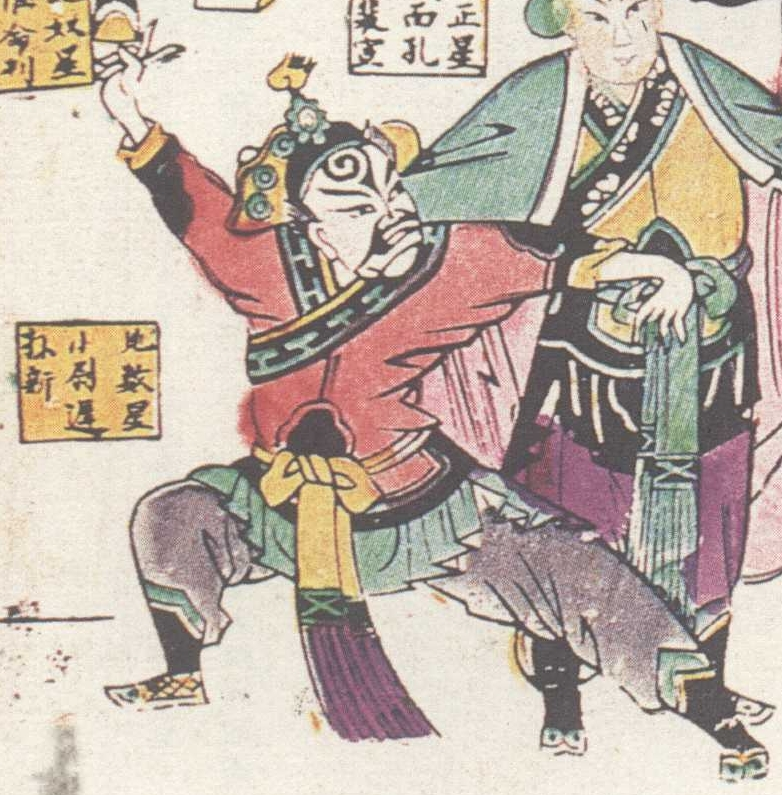
- a Qing dynasty illustration of Sun Xin
- First appearance: Chapter 49

In-universe information
- Nickname: "Little Yuchi" 小尉遲
- Origin: tavern owner
- Designation: Reconnaissance Commander of Liangshan
- Rank: 100th, Number Star (地數星) of the 72 Earthly Fiends
- Ancestral home / Place of origin: Qiongzhou (present-day Hainan)

Chinese names
- Simplified Chinese: 孙新
- Traditional Chinese: 孫新
- Pinyin: Sūn Xīn
- Wade–Giles: Sun Hsin

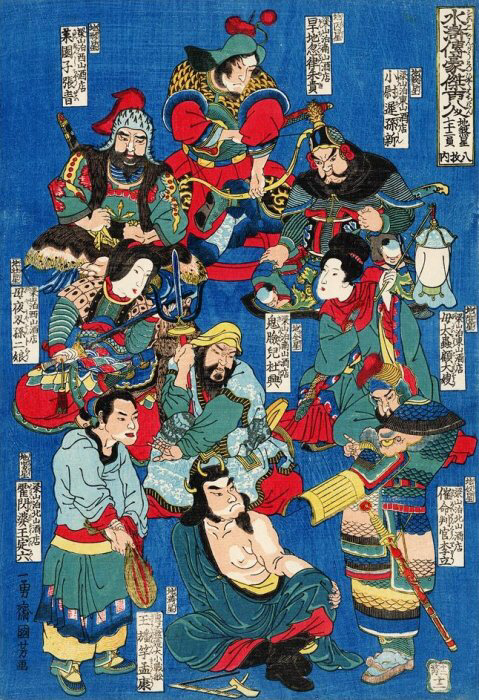
An illustration of nine of the 108 Heroes by Utagawa Kuniyoshi. Du Xing is in the centre. The rest are (clockwise from top): Zhu Gui, Sun Xin, Gu Dasao, Li Li, Meng Kang, Wang Dingliu, Sun Erniang, and Zhang Qing.

Sun Xin is a fictional character in Water Margin, one of the Classic Chinese Novels. Nicknamed "Little Yuchi", he ranks 100th among the 108 Heroes and 64th among the 72 Earthly Fiends.

== Background ==
Originally from Qiongzhou (瓊州; present-day Hainan), Sun Xin is described in the novel as a tall and robustly built man with sparkling eyes. He is nicknamed "Little Yuchi" – derived from his elder brother Sun Li's nickname "Sick (Note: 病, which means "sick", is a homonym of 並, which means "to be comparable or equivalent to". Sun Li's nickname can thus be understood to mean "Equivalent/Comparable to Yuchi (Gong)".) Yuchi" – as the brothers resemble the Tang dynasty general Yuchi Gong in appearance. The brothers live in Dengzhou (登州; around present-day Penglai, Shandong), where Sun Li serves as a military officer under the governor, while Sun Xin and his wife Gu Dasao run a tavern.

== Becoming an outlaw ==
Sun Xin is first introduced in the novel when he and his wife Gu Dasao approach his brother Sun Li to ask him to join them in carrying out a prison raid in Dengzhou to rescue Gu Dasao's cousins, the brothers Xie Zhen and Xie Bao, who have been framed for theft and wrongfully imprisoned. Initially reluctant to participate in their plan, Sun Li is forced to do so after Sun Xin and Gu Dasao threaten to sever ties with him and fight him if he refuses. The three of them also enlist the help of Sun Li's brother-in-law Yue He and the outlaws Zou Yuan and Zou Run, an uncle–nephew duo from Laizhou.

On the night of the prison raid, Yue He secretly lets Gu Dasao into the prison under the pretence of delivering food to prisoners. While Gu Dasao works with the Sun brothers and the others to wreak havoc inside and outside the prison, Yue He takes advantage of the chaos to free the Xie brothers. After the raid is over, they join the Xie brothers in taking revenge by slaughtering those responsible for their plight. Following that, the group decides to head to Liangshan Marsh to join the outlaw band there.

== Battle against the Zhu Family Village ==
Before formally joining Liangshan, the group decides to prove themselves by helping the outlaws destroy the Zhu Family Village, a fortified village run by the three Zhu brothers and their father, who have been very hostile towards the Liangshan outlaws. Previously, the outlaws have launched two assaults on the village but failed to overcome the defences.

Sun Li, who was trained by the same martial arts master as Luan Tingyu, the village's resident martial arts instructor, volunteers to make use of his acquaintance with Luan to infiltrate the village and carry out an espionage mission for Liangshan. Gu Dasao, Sun Xin, the Xie brothers, and the Zous accompany Sun Li on the mission. The Zhus and Luan Tingyu are initially suspicious when Sun Li and his group show up and claim to have come to help them fight the Liangshan outlaws. However, they trust the newcomers after Sun Li apparently defeats and captures Liangshan's Shi Xiu in a duel on horseback.

Sun Li and his group ultimately complete their mission successfully, allowing the outlaws to overrun the village on their third assault. After that, the group formally becomes part of the Liangshan outlaw band.

== Campaigns and later life ==
Sun Xin is appointed as a commander of Liangshan's reconnaissance team after the 108 Heroes are fully assembled. Together with his wife Gu Dasao, he takes charge of an outpost to the east of Liangshan, disguising and running it as a tavern to gather intelligence.

After Emperor Huizong grants amnesty to the Liangshan outlaws, Sun Xin joins them in the campaigns against the Liao invaders and rebel forces in Song territory.

Sun Xin and Gu Dasao are among the few Liangshan heroes who survive all the campaigns. To honour him for his contributions during the campaigns, the emperor awards Sun Xin the title "Martial Gentleman of Grace" (武奕郎) and offers him an official appointment. However, Sun Xin declines and chooses to return to Dengzhou with his wife to live as commoners for the rest of their lives.
