= Gu Dasao =

Fictional character in the Chinese classical novel Water Margin

- Water Margin character
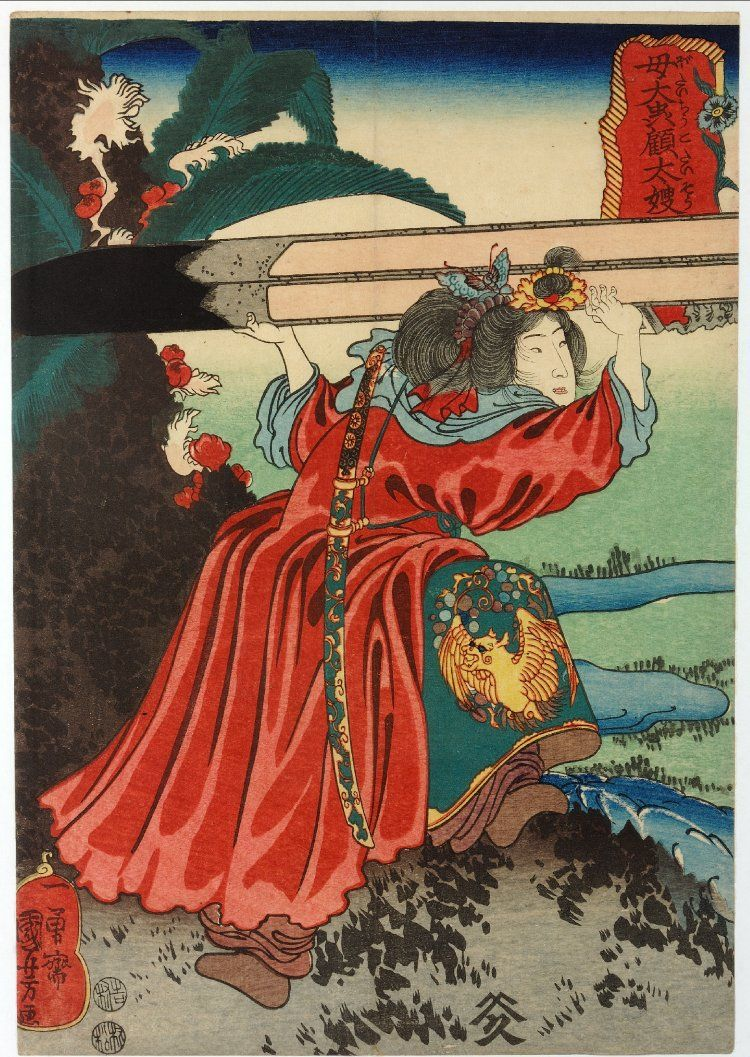
- an illustration of Gu Dasao by Utagawa Kuniyoshi
- First appearance: Chapter 49

In-universe information
- Nickname: "Female Tiger (Note: 大蟲, which literally means "big bug", is used as a euphemism or literary term in place of 虎, the proper Chinese term for tiger. See the Wiktionary entry for 大蟲.)" 母大蟲
- Origin: tavern owner
- Designation: Reconnaissance Commander of Liangshan
- Rank: 101st, Yin Star (地陰星) of the 72 Earthly Fiends

Chinese names
- Simplified Chinese: 顾大嫂
- Traditional Chinese: 顧大嫂
- Pinyin: Gù Dàsǎo
- Wade–Giles: Ku Ta-sao

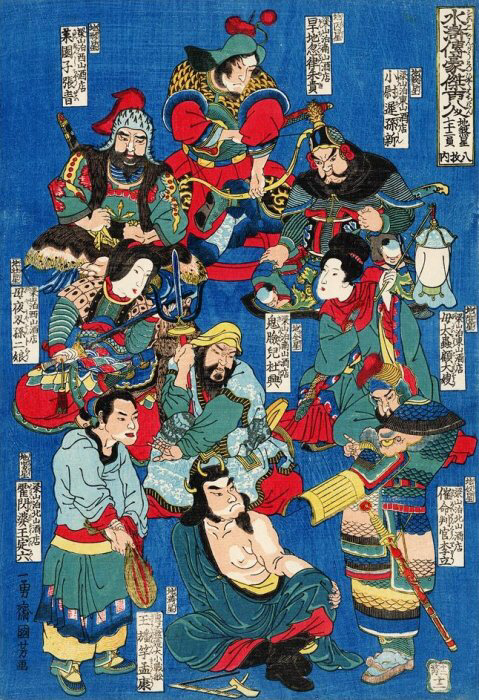
An illustration of nine of the 108 Heroes by Utagawa Kuniyoshi. Du Xing is in the centre. The rest are (clockwise from top): Zhu Gui, Sun Xin, Gu Dasao, Li Li, Meng Kang, Wang Dingliu, Sun Erniang, and Zhang Qing.

Gu Dasao, literally "Elder Sister-in-Law Gu", is a fictional character in Water Margin, one of the Classic Chinese Novels. Nicknamed "Female Tiger", she ranks 101st among the 108 Heroes and 65th among the 72 Earthly Fiends.

== Background ==
The novel describes Gu Dasao as a woman with thick eyebrows, large eyes, a plump face, and a thick waist. She wears various ornaments on her head and wrists. Nicknamed "Female Tiger" for her hot temper and pugnacious character, she is a highly-skilled fighter specialising in polearms such as the spear / lance and staff and capable of fighting up to 30 men at the same time.

Gu Dasao is married to Sun Xin, with whom she runs a tavern in Dengzhou (登州; around present-day Penglai, Shandong). Sun Xin's elder brother, Sun Li, serves as a military officer under the governor.

== Becoming an outlaw ==
Gu Dasao is first introduced in the novel when she and her husband Sun Xin approach his brother Sun Li to ask him to join them in carrying out a prison raid in Dengzhou to rescue her cousins, the brothers Xie Zhen and Xie Bao, who have been framed for theft and wrongfully imprisoned. Initially reluctant to participate in their plan, Sun Li is forced to do so after Gu Dasao and Sun Xin threaten to sever ties with him and fight him if he refuses. The three of them also enlist the help of Sun Li's brother-in-law Yue He and the outlaws Zou Yuan and Zou Run, an uncle–nephew duo from Laizhou.

On the night of the prison raid, Yue He secretly lets Gu Dasao into the prison under the pretence of delivering food to prisoners. While Gu Dasao works with the Sun brothers and the others to wreak havoc inside and outside the prison, Yue He takes advantage of the chaos to free the Xie brothers. After the raid is over, they join the Xie brothers in taking revenge by slaughtering those responsible for their plight. Following that, the group decides to head to Liangshan Marsh to join the outlaw band there.

== Battle against the Zhu Family Village ==
Before formally joining Liangshan, the group decides to prove themselves by helping the outlaws destroy the Zhu Family Village, a fortified village run by the three Zhu brothers and their father, who have been very hostile towards the Liangshan outlaws. Previously, the outlaws have launched two assaults on the village but failed to overcome the defences.

Sun Li, who was trained by the same martial arts master as Luan Tingyu, the village's resident martial arts instructor, volunteers to make use of his acquaintance with Luan to infiltrate the village and carry out an espionage mission for Liangshan. Gu Dasao, Sun Xin, the Xie brothers, and the Zous accompany Sun Li on the mission. The Zhus and Luan Tingyu are initially suspicious when Sun Li and his group show up and claim to have come to help them fight the Liangshan outlaws. However, they trust the newcomers after Sun Li apparently defeats and captures Liangshan's Shi Xiu in a duel on horseback.

Sun Li and his group ultimately complete their mission successfully, allowing the outlaws to overrun the village on their third assault. After that, the group formally becomes part of the Liangshan outlaw band.

== Campaigns and later life ==
Gu Dasao is appointed as a commander of Liangshan's reconnaissance team after the 108 Heroes are fully assembled. Together with her husband Sun Xin, she takes charge of an outpost to the east of Liangshan, disguising and running it as a tavern to gather intelligence.

After Emperor Huizong grants amnesty to the Liangshan outlaws, Gu Dasao joins them in the campaigns against the Liao invaders and rebel forces in Song territory.

Gu Dasao and Sun Xin are among the few Liangshan heroes who survive all the campaigns. To honour her for her contributions during the campaigns, the emperor awards Gu Dasao the title "Lady of Dongyuan County" (東源縣君) and offers her husband an official appointment. However, Sun Xin declines and chooses to return to Dengzhou with Gu Dasao to live as commoners for the rest of their lives.
