= Li Mingqi =

Chinese actress

- 李明启
- Born: February 20, 1936 (age 89); Dandong, Fengtian Province, Manchukuo
- Occupation: Actress
- Years active: 1960-present
- Children: 1

Chinese name
- Traditional Chinese: 李明啟
- Simplified Chinese: 李明启
Transcriptions
Standard Mandarin
- Hanyu Pinyin: Lǐ Míngqǐ

Li Mingqi (Chinese: 李明启; born 20 February 1936) is a Chinese actress best known for her roles as Granny Wang on The Water Margin (1996), Wet-Nurse Rong on My Fair Princess (1997) and Granny Sun on The Return of the Condor Heroes (2006).

== Early life ==
Li was born in Dandong, Fengtian Province, Manchukuo, on February 20, 1936. Her father died early. At the age of 16, she joined the Railway propaganda team as an actress.

== Acting career ==
In 1960 Li made her film debut with a small role in Train 12.

In 1996 she gained national fame for her starring role as Granny Wang in the television series The Water Margin, adapted from Shi Nai'an's classical novel of the same title.

Li became widely known to audiences with My Fair Princess (1997), in which she played Wet-Nurse Rong. Other cast members are Zhang Tielin, Zhao Wei, Alec Su, Ruby Lin, and Zhou Jie. She reprised her role in My Fair Princess 2, but was not in the third installment, My Fair Princess 3.

In 2004, she was cast as Empress Dowager Cixi in Cook Officer, opposite Li Baotian, Tian Hairong, Shu Chang and Wang Luyao.

In 2006, Li had a supporting role in The Return of the Condor Heroes, a wuxia television series adaptation based on the novel of the same name by Jin Yong. It stars Huang Xiaoming and Liu Yifei.

On February 25, 2018, she appeared in the CCTV New Year's Gala alongside Lin Yongjian, Yang Shaohua, Wang Liyun, Li Qi, Li Chengru, and Yang Zi.

== Personal life ==
Li is married and has a son named Wang Jun (Chinese: 王隽).

== Filmography ==
=== Film ===
Year	English title	Chinese title	Role	Notes
1960	Train 12	12次列车	Xiao Ye	
1985	Love and Hate	爱与恨	Director of nursery school	
1988	Son-In-Law and His Father-In-Law	黑脸女婿	Liu Yuxia	
1990	Ninety-six Million Pairs of Eyes	九千六百万双眼睛	Gu Zhen	
1991	Green Leaves of Home	青春无悔	Mother Zheng	
1991	Woman-TAXI-Woman	女人TAXI女人		
1993	Sub-Husband	编外丈夫		
1993	Fitial Son And Fitial Piety	孝子贤孙伺候着		
1993	Fool in Love	爱情傻瓜	Xie You's mother	
1995	Armed Working Team Behind Enemy Lines	敌后武工队	Aunt	
1996	Young Girl's Red Hairpin	红发卡	Grandma Feng	
1999	I'll Love You More Tomorrow	明天我爱你	Sanduo's mother	
1999	Happy Times	没事偷着乐	Aunt Zhang	
2002	Father	父亲	Mother	
2003	Bear in Mind	让我们记住		
2003	The Law of Romance	警察有约	Grandpa Mao	
2006	The Story of Ah Bao	阿宝的故事	Jingjing's grandma	
2009	Weddings at the Yellow River	黄河喜事	Zhang Lanhua	
2010	A Thousand Miles Away	千里之外		
2011	Aeolian Bells	风铃	Liu Caixia	
2017		冼夫人之浩气英风	Madam Xian	
2019	For Love with You	一切如你		
2020		孝感天地	Counselor	

=== Television ===
Year	English title	Chinese title	Role	Notes
1987	Plainclothes policeman	便衣警察	Aunt Zheng	
1987	Prime Minister of the Town	小镇总理	Xiao Cui's mother	
1989	Good Men, Good Women	好男好女	Aunt	
1990		武生泰斗	Wife of Master Jin	
1993	Zhou Lanu	周拉奴	Zhou Lanu	
1993		小楼风景		
1993	I Love My Family	我爱我家	Aunt Li	
1994	Little Dunzi	小墩子	Dunzi's mother	
1994	Feathers	一地鸡毛	Zhou's wife	
1994		今生是亲人		
1994		针眼儿警官	Aunt Shan	
1995	PCHome	电脑之家	Grandmother	
1995	Rainy Day has a Story	雨天有故事	Aunt Ye	
1995	Sunrise and Sunset	日出日落		
1995	Story of Late Autumn in Beijing	北京深秋的故事		
1995	Kingdoms of the Spring and Autumn Period of the Eastern Zhou Dynasty	东周列国·春秋篇	Old woman	
1996	Son of the Earth	大地之子	Aunt Liu	
1996	The Water Margin	水浒传	Granny Wang	
1996	Story of My Family	我家的故事	Zeng Qiang's mother	
1998	Female Prisoner	女囚	Aunt Sun	
1998	Rickshaw Boy	骆驼祥子		
1998		家和万事兴之在外过年	A peasant	
1998	My Fair Princess	还珠格格	Wet-Nurse Rong	
1999	Chivalous Robber Lee-San	燕子李三	Bawd	
1999		二马		
1999	The Mountain is still Green	青山依旧		
1999	The Act of the Youngs	青春出动	Yu Yuanyuan's mother	
1999	My Fair Princess 2	还珠格格第二部	Wet-Nurse Rong	
2000	Bluelover	蓝色妖姬	Empress Dowager Cixi	
2000	Idle Miss Ma	闲人马大姐	Herself	
2001	King of Kings	王中王	Wet-Nurse Niu	
2001		金搏虎	Lian's Mother	
2001		秋香情戏唐伯虎	Liu's Mother	
2001	Border beauty Chen Yuanyuan	边关丽人陈圆圆		
2001	Bunheads	婆媳过招	Zhang Manshu	
2001		拯救少年犯		
2001		田教授家的二十八个房客	Aunt Hong	
2001	A Family in the Northeast of China	东北一家人	Grandma Hua	
2002	Communist Party Member Sister Ma	党员马大姐		
2002	Together	在一起		
2002		可怜天下男人心		
2002	Black Cloth	青衣		
2002	The Merchant	钱王		
2003	Empty Love	无情的爱	Grandma Xu	
2003		爸爸叫红旗	Mother	
2003		中国刑警之九月风暴	Mother	
2004		夫妻住对门	Jin Dou's mother	
2004	Armed Forces Police	武装特警	Yang's mother	
2004		华氏100度		
2004	The Empty House	空房子	Grandma Jin	
2005	Xianfeng Emperor	咸丰王朝之一帘幽梦		
2005	Nine Daughters in The Family	家有九凤	Mother	
2005	Cook Officer	厨子当官	Empress Dowager Cixi	
2006	Irresistible	无法抗拒	Pei Xinyi's mother	
2006	I Wish I Knew	海上传奇		
2006	The Return of the Condor Heroes	神雕侠侣	Granny Sun	
2007	Double Sided Adhesive Tape	双面胶	Ya Ping's mother	
2007		你的生命，我的决定		
2007		小城往事	Bai's mother	
2008	Mortgage Slave	房奴	Ding's mother	
2009		三七撞上二十一	Zhai's mother	
2009		今生欠你一个拥抱	Grandma Wu	
2009	Life without language	没有语言的生活	Ying Xiaodong	
2009	Around the Home	家里家外	Xie Yujin	
2010	Pretty Woman	漂亮女人	Li's mother	
2010	My Beautiful Life	我的美丽人生	Wu Qiaobao	
2010		胡杨女人	Grandma	
2011	The Pursuit of Happyness	幸福来敲门	Granny Zhu	
2011	Spring Blossoms	春暖花开	Aunt Yue	
2011	You Are My Happiness	你是我的幸福	Grandmother	
2013		天下人家	Anut Pang	
2013	Baby Child Back Home	宝贝儿回家	Song's mother	
2013	I Love You the Most	最爱你	Zhang's mother	
2013	Spring of My Husband	老公的春天	Gong's mother	
2014		孝子难当		
2014	Male Matchmaker	男媒婆	Yang Jinfang	
2014	Love, the Most Beautiful	爱情最美丽	Zhang Lanhua	
2014		满仓进城	Grandmother	
2016		江城警事	Grandma	
2019	Our life is Full of Sunshine	我们的生活充满阳光	Mother Jiang	

== Film and TV Awards ==
Year	Nominated work	Award	Category	Result	Notes
1987	Plainclothes policeman	Jindun Awards	Best Actress	Won	
1990		Flying Apsaras Awards	Outstanding Actress	Won	
1993		Wenhua Awards	Best Performance	Won	
1994		Flying Apsaras Awards	Outstanding Actress	Won	
