= Du Jin =

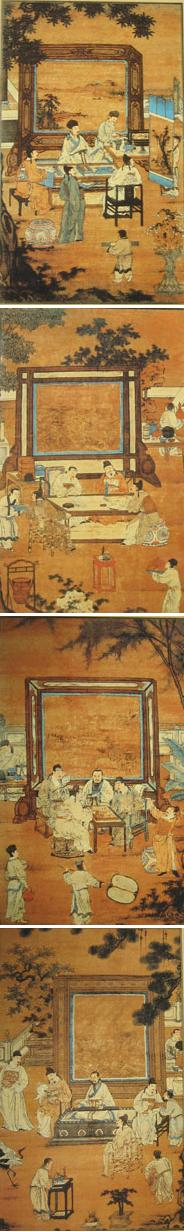
Du Jin, Silk Painting

Du Jin (Tu Chin, traditional: 杜堇, simplified: 杜堇); (ca. 1465–1509) was a Chinese painter of landscapes, human figures, flowers, and animals during the Ming dynasty (1368–1644). Du's specific birth and death years are unknown.

Du was born in Zhenjiang in the Jiangsu province. His style name was 'Junan' and his sobriquets were 'Chengju, Gukuang, Qingxia tingzhang'. Du later moved to Beijing where he produced many of his works.

The adjoining four-part silk painting is on the traditional subject of the Four Arts of the Chinese Scholar and is called "18 Scholars"; it is in the Shanghai Museum.

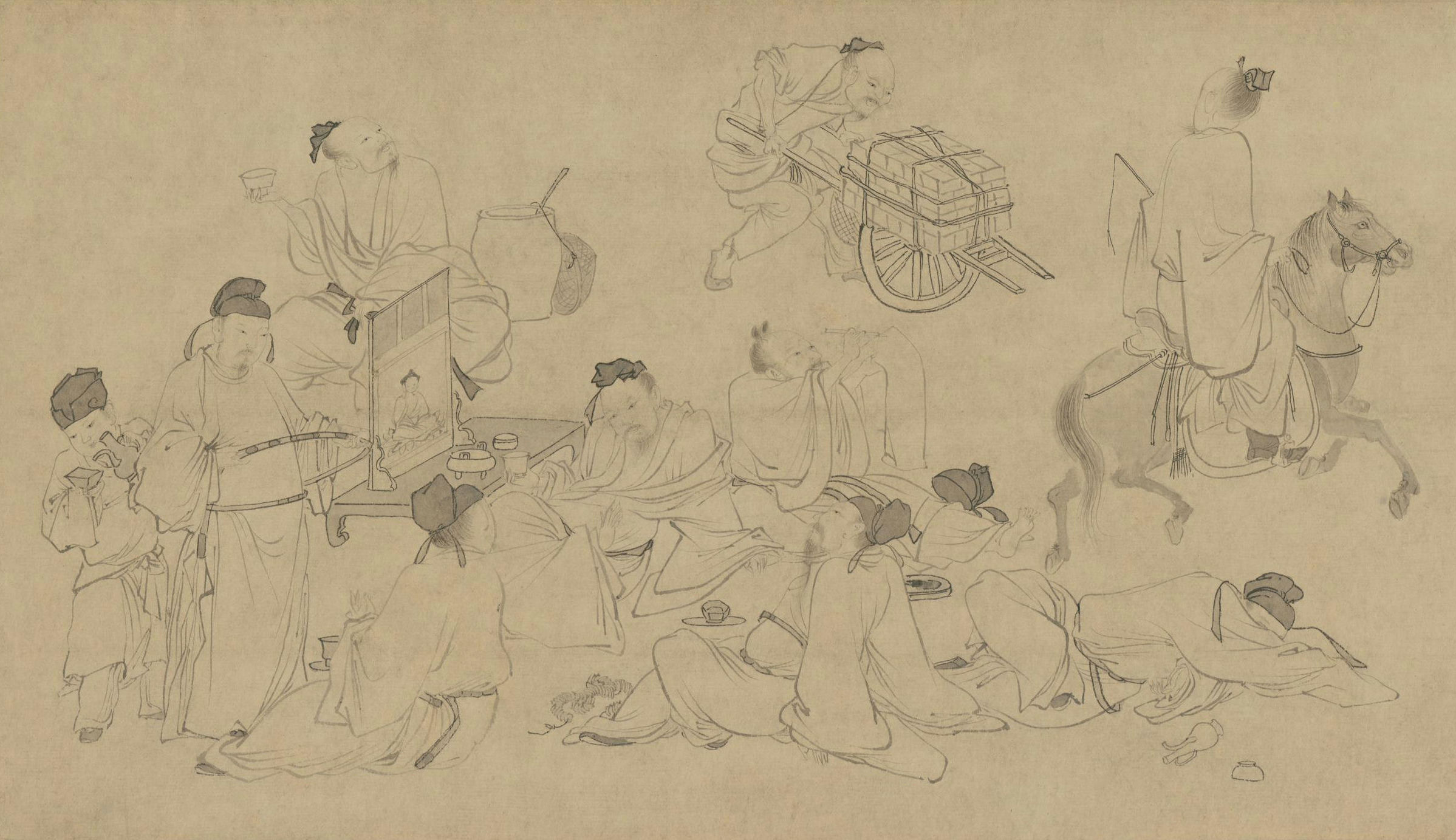
Eight Immortals of the Wine Cup

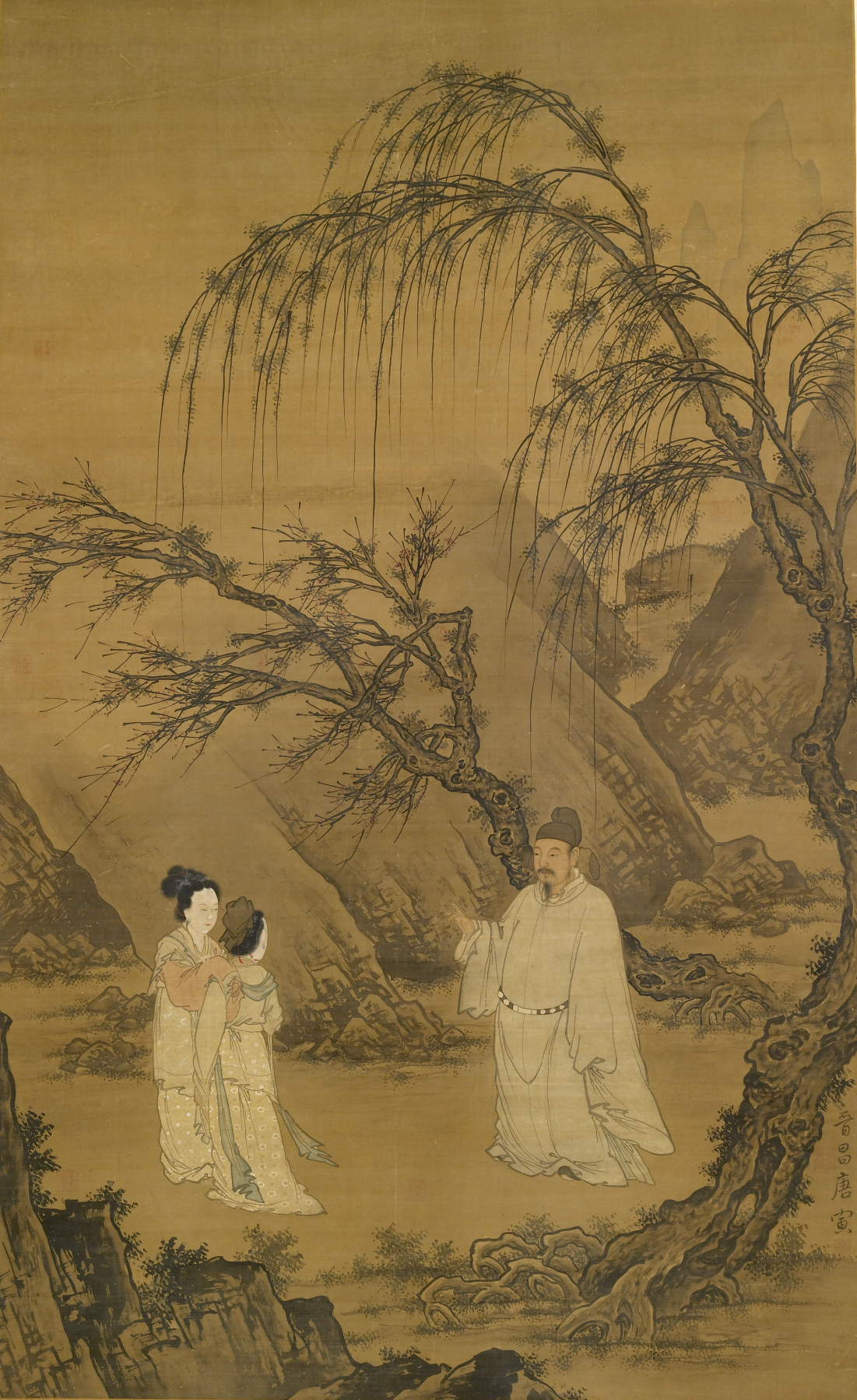
Wang Xianzhi and two women Amidst Willows and Rocks

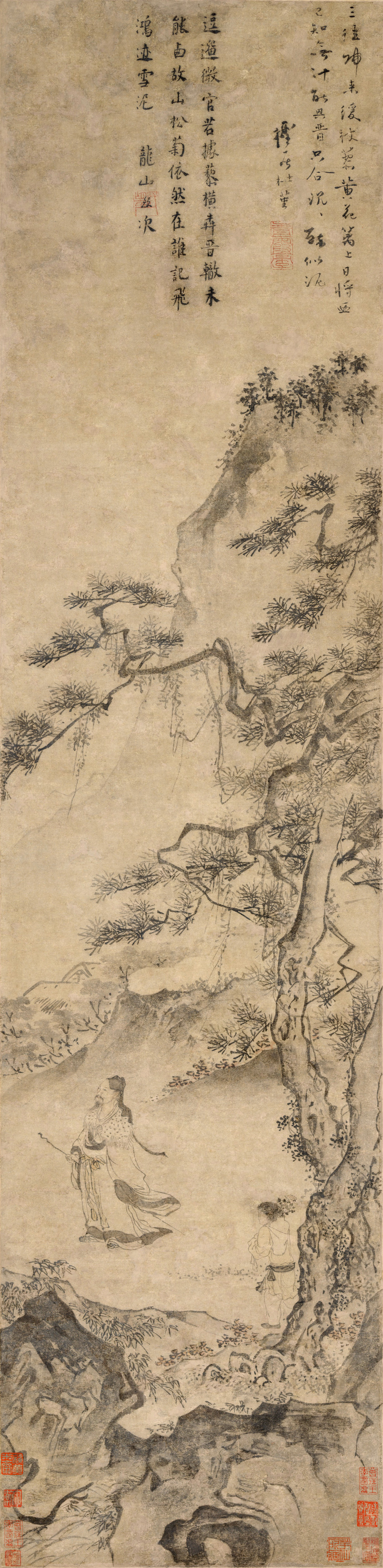
Tao Yuanming enjoying Chrysanthemums.

Enjoying Bamboos.

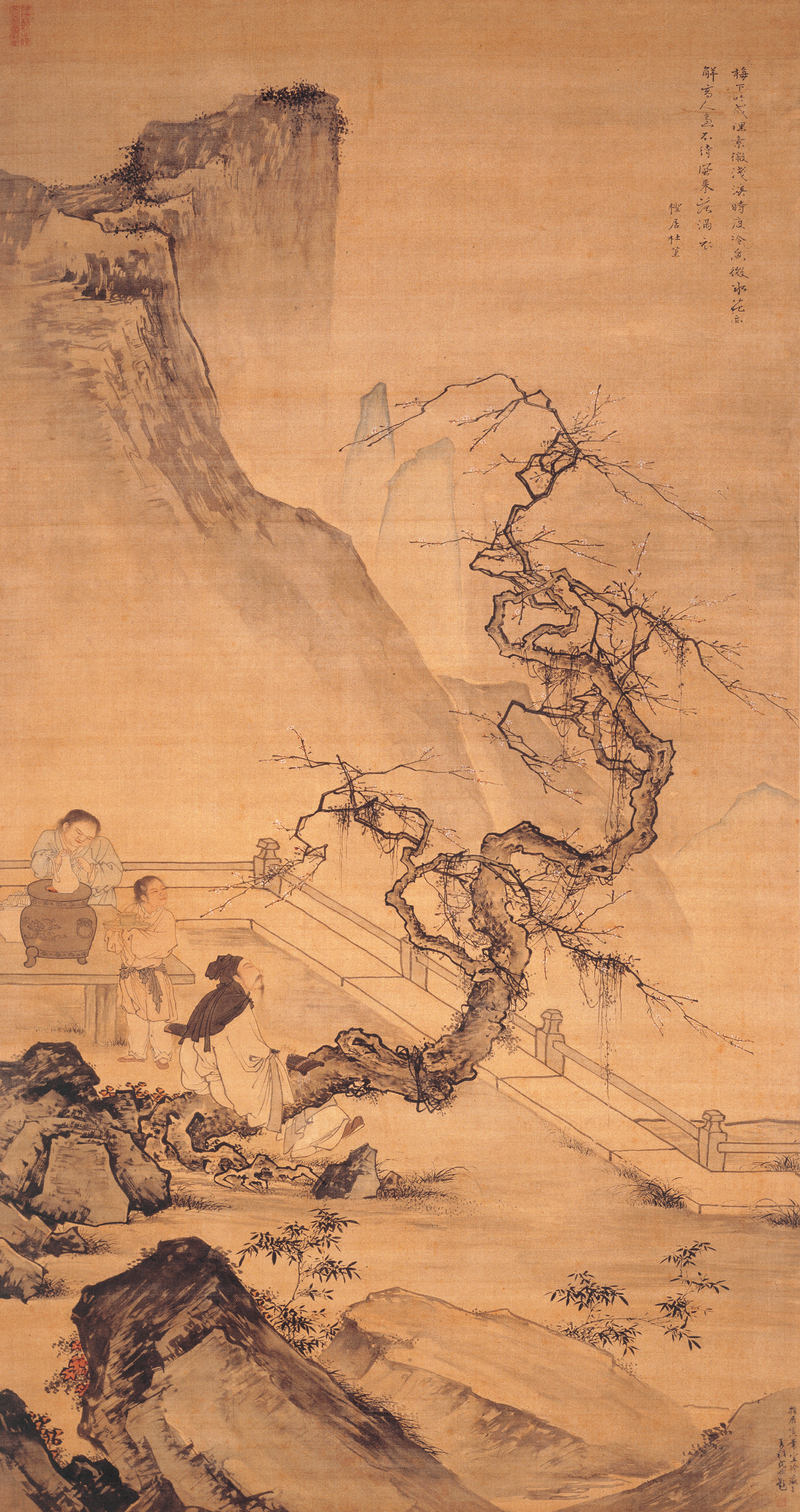
Playing weiqi under a Plum Tree

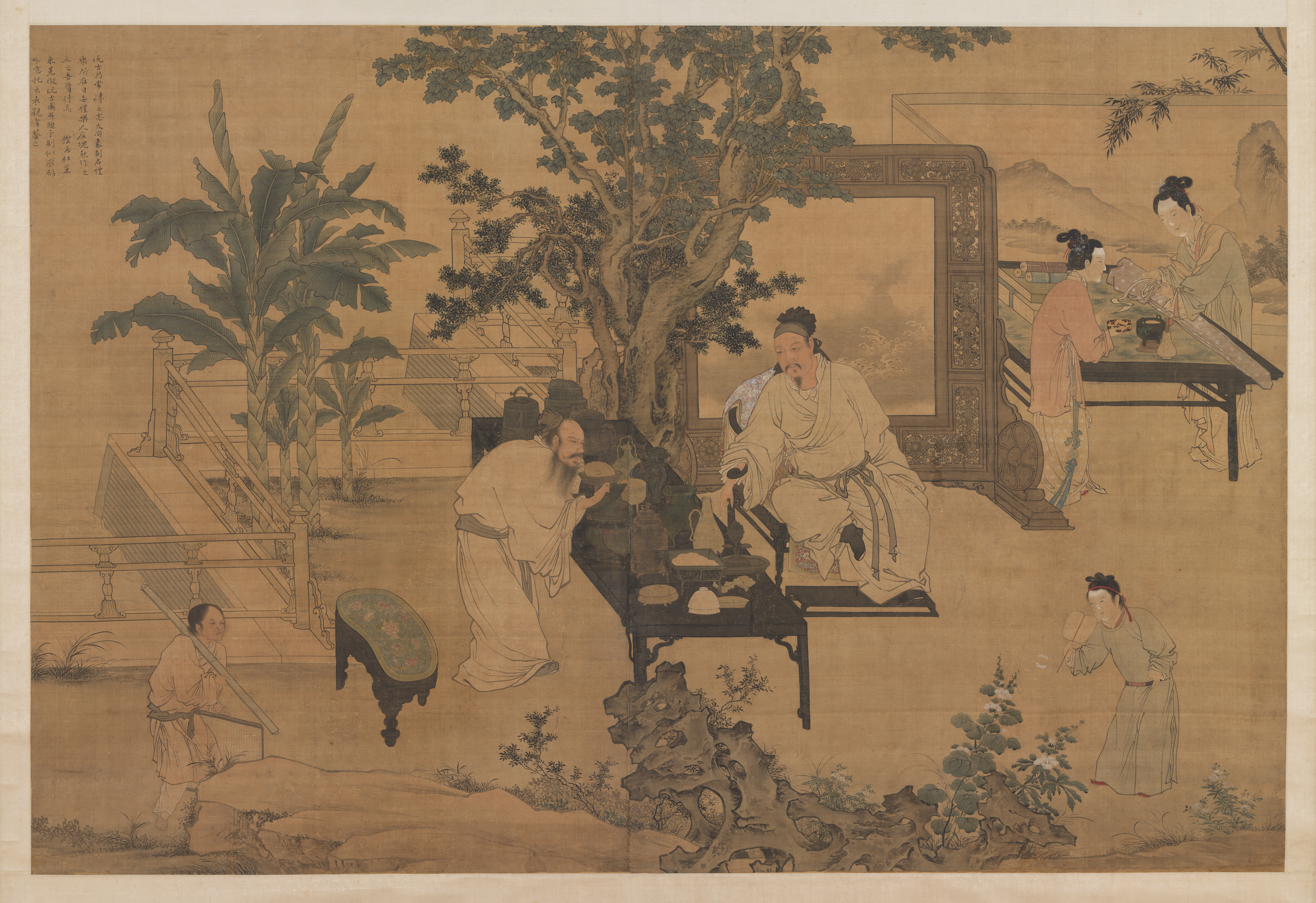
Enjoying Antiquities.

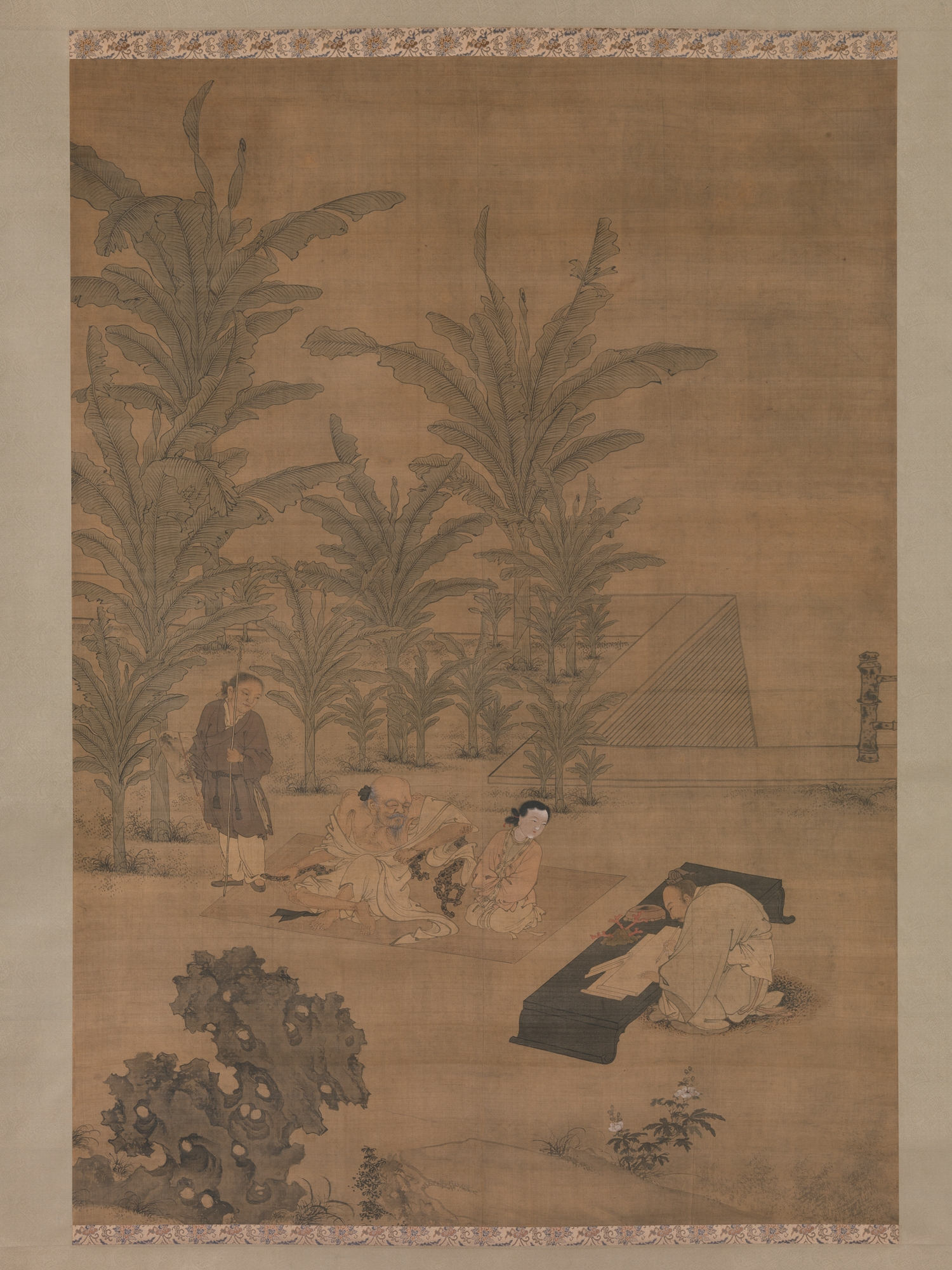
The Scholar Fu Sheng Transmitting the Book of Documents

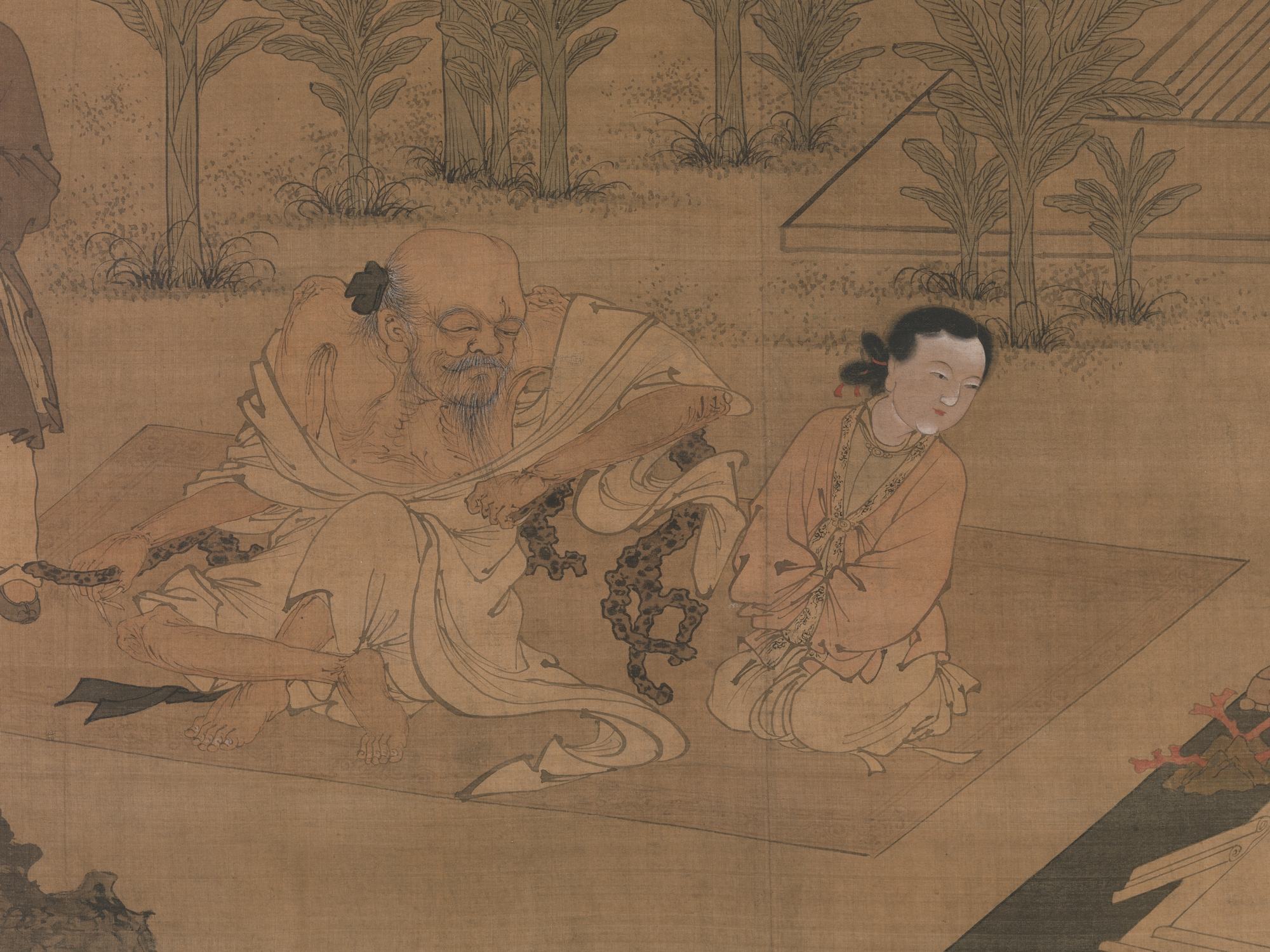
The Scholar Fu Sheng Transmitting the Book of Documents (détail).

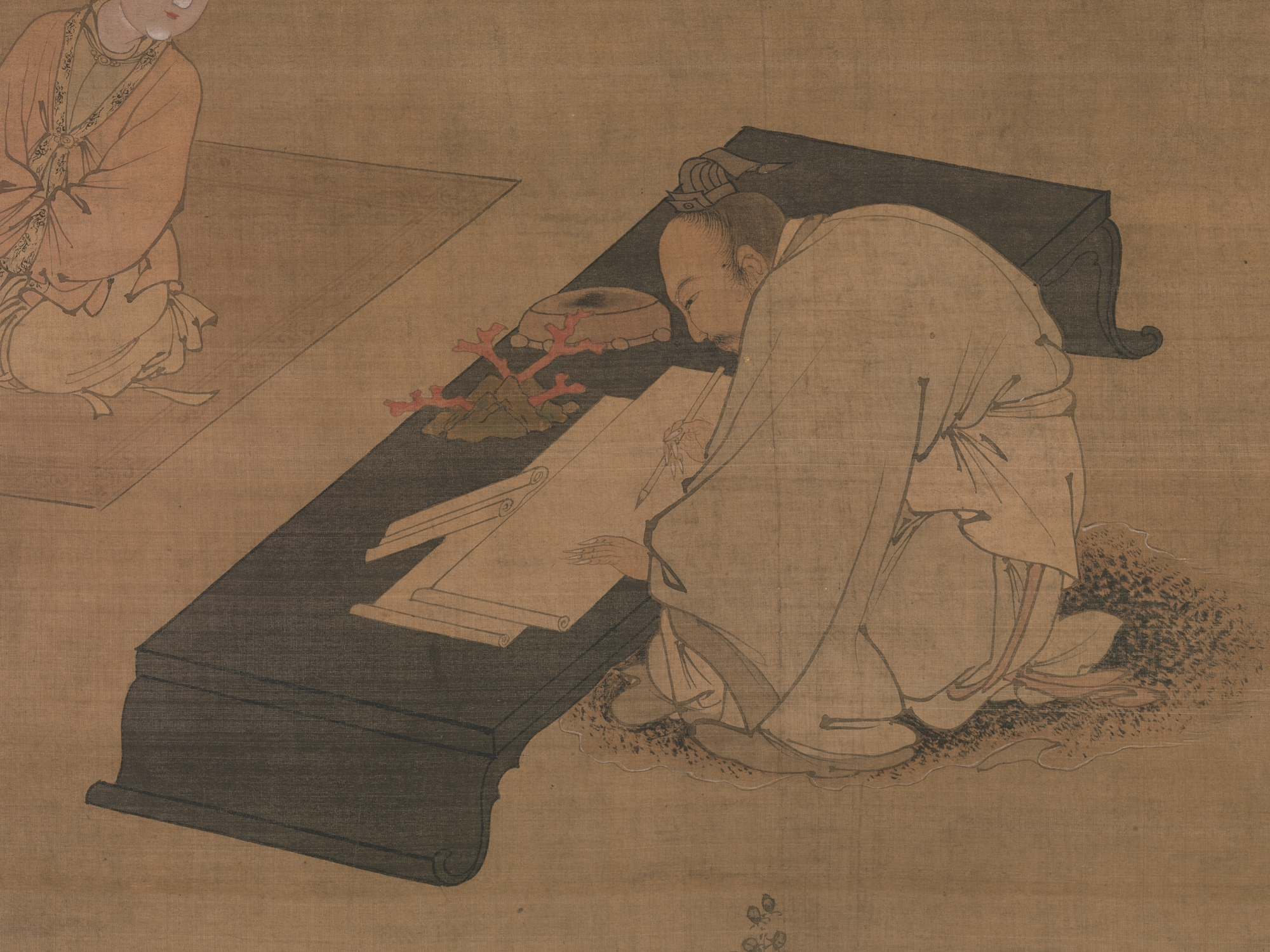
The Scholar Fu Sheng Transmitting the Book of Documents (détail).

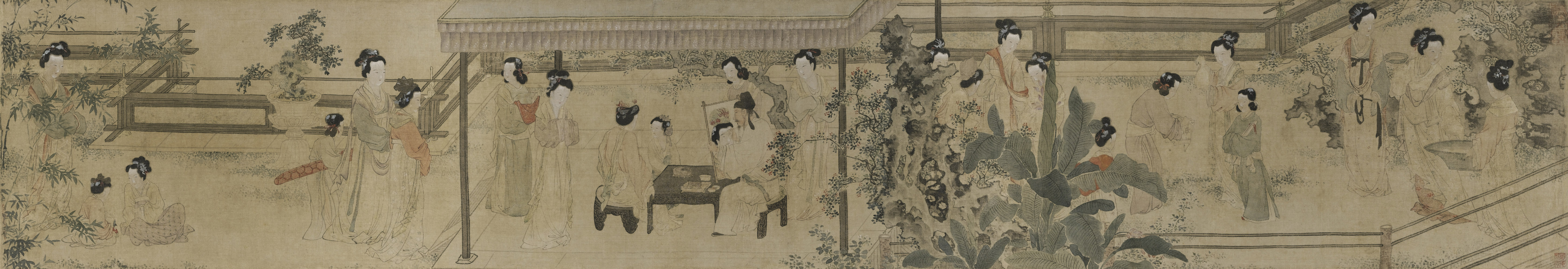
Court Ladies Handscroll, 1.

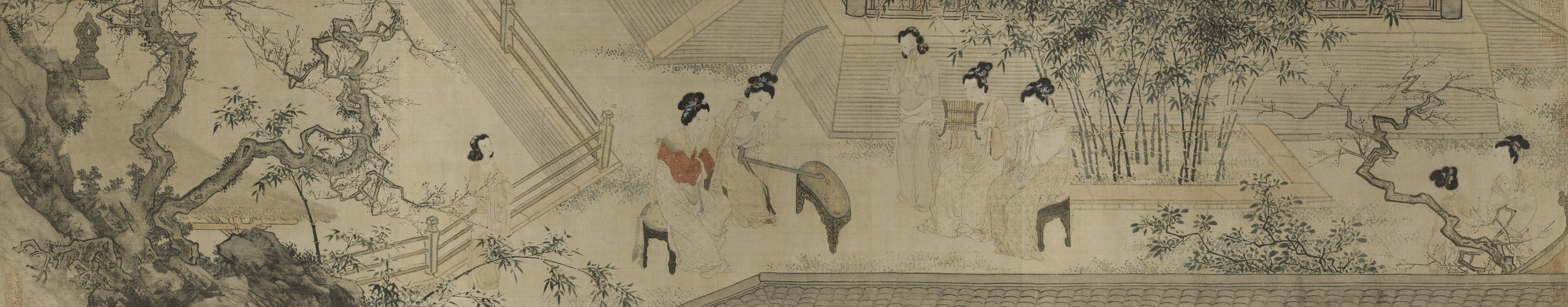
Court Ladies Handscroll, 2.

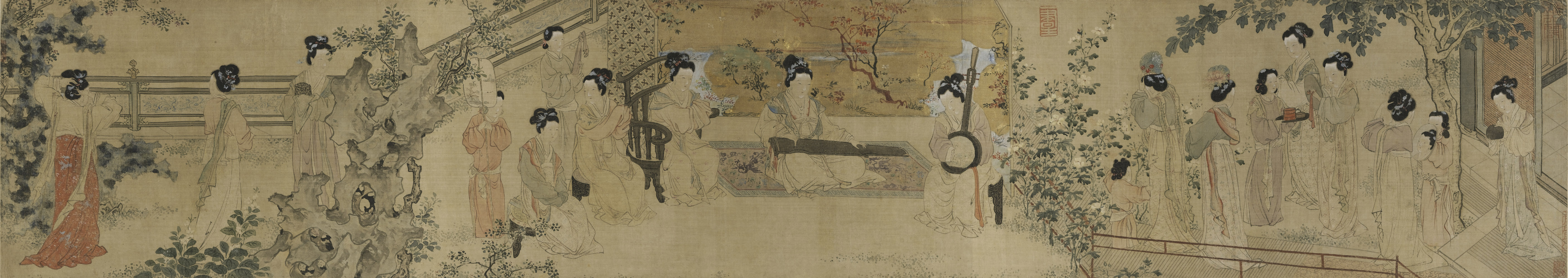
Court Ladies Handscroll, 3.
