= Dengzhou Subdistrict =

Subdistrict of Penglai, Shandong, China

Coordinates: 37.8103°N 120.7605°E

Dengzhou Subdistrict (Chinese: 登州街道) is a subdistrict of Penglai, Shandong, China.
