= Wang Xianzhi =

Wang Xianzhi may refer to:

- Wang Xianzhi (calligrapher) (344–386), influential calligrapher of the Jin dynasty
- Wang Xianzhi (rebel) (died 878), major rebel of the Tang dynasty
