= Huizhu Lu =

12th/13th-century Chinese history book

The Huizhu Lu (揮麈錄; "Records of Waving a Duster") is a 12th-century (or early 13th-century) biji-style Chinese history book written by the Song dynasty scholar Wang Mingqing (王明清) who wrote the book over a period of 30 years. Focusing mainly on the fall of the Northern Song dynasty (Jingkang incident) of 1127 and the restoration of the dynasty, the book contains a lot of information on the functioning of the imperial court.

It contains 4 sections:

- "Former Records" (前錄), 4 chapters
- "Latter Records" (後錄), 11 chapters
- "Three Records" (三錄), 3 chapters
- "Addendum" (餘話), 2 chapters
