= Military fork =

Type of polearm

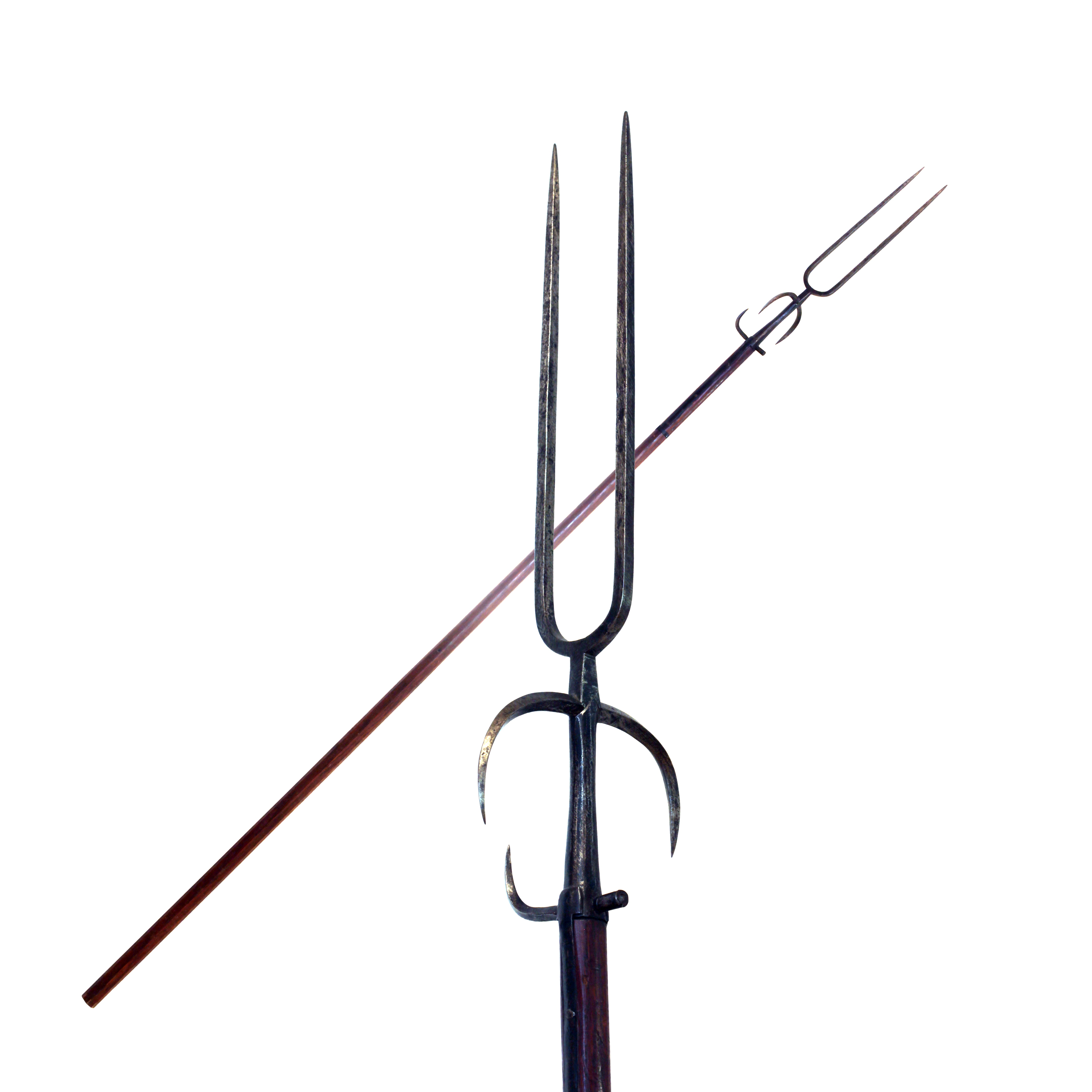
Military fork, c. late 16th – early 17th century. About 2.5 metres overall. On display at Morges military museum.

A military fork is a polearm which was used in Europe between the 15th and 19th centuries. Like many polearms, the military fork traces its lineage to an agricultural tool, in this case the pitchfork. Unlike a trident used for fishing, the military fork was rarely barbed and normally consisted only of two tines (prongs) which were straight compared to the original pitchfork. The pair of tines usually ran parallel or slightly flared. This weapon was relatively easy to use compared to a sword, which could take years to learn how to wield effectively. It was usually used in absence of a spear. Like a spear, the military fork could be used in tight formations and was often made with various minor customizations to improve use; in the example of the image above, the fork has a hook parallel to the prongs intended to "catch" the blow of a weapon, as well as two "hooks" intended to dismount a knight from his horse.
