= Gao Qiu =

12th-century Chinese government official

- Chinese: 高俅
Transcriptions
Standard Mandarin
- Hanyu Pinyin: Gāo Qiú
- Wade–Giles: Kao Chiu

Gao Qiu (1076?–1126) was a Chinese politician who lived during the Song dynasty and served in the court of Emperor Huizong. In the classical novel Water Margin, he is fictionalised as one of the primary antagonists and a nemesis of the protagonists, the 108 Heroes of Mount Liang.

== Life ==
Gao Qiu was presumably born around 1076 AD.

According to the Chinese historical text Huizhulu (揮麈錄) by Wang Mingqing, Gao Qiu was from Kaifeng - then the capital of the empire - and his father was Gao Dunfu (高敦復). He had two brothers and four sons. The second child of his family, he was named by his father.

== Career ==
Gao Qiu was a servant of the poet and statesman Su Shi (Su Dongpo) before moving on to serve the artist Wang Shen. According to the Huizhulu, he was a skilled writer. He met Emperor Huizong in around November 1109 AD; during the emperor's reign he participated in battles under Liu Zhongwu's command and followed Lin Shu on a diplomatic mission to the Khitan-led Liao dynasty. As the emperor highly favoured him, he rose through the ranks quickly and became Grand Marshal (太尉) in 1117 AD, only 8 years after his patron's ascension to the throne. The emperor's liking for Gao was the result of the latter's skill at Cuju, a sport the monarch greatly enjoyed; he was further pleased by Gao Qiu's literary and artistic talents. Beyond these superficial qualities, however, it is believed that Gao made great contributions to Emperor Huizong's reign.

As Gao built a successful career, he accumulated fame and riches for his family, while unscrupulously undermining his enemies. He recommended the son of his old superior Liu Zhongwu to Emperor Huizong, setting him on the path to becoming a famous general. He also took great care of Su Shi's disciples with financial aid and respect.

After Emperor Huizong's abdication on 18 January 1126, Gao's influence in the Song imperial court decreased and he died of illness in 1126. He was posthumously removed from office for corrupting the army and government.

== Comments on Gao Qiu in reality ==
Gao Qiu not only relied on good Cuju to be favored, but also his artistic interest and lifestyle that attracted Emperor Huizong very much. Therefore, in fact their relationship had exceeded the relationship between general monarch and minister, to the relationship of good friends. This should be the reason why he was favoured for over 25 years.

Gao Qiu was not as ungrateful as recorded in the novel Water Margin, but a person who was considerate in return. He took care of Su Shi's disciples when they were severely suppressed by Emperor Huizong. Liu Zhongwu was once Gao Qiu's superior and helped him get promoted. After Gao Qiu became Grand Marshal, he recommended the son of Liu Zhongwu, Liu Qi, who later became a famous general against Jin. From these two things we can see what kind of person Gao Qiu was.

== Gao Qiu's depictions in fiction ==
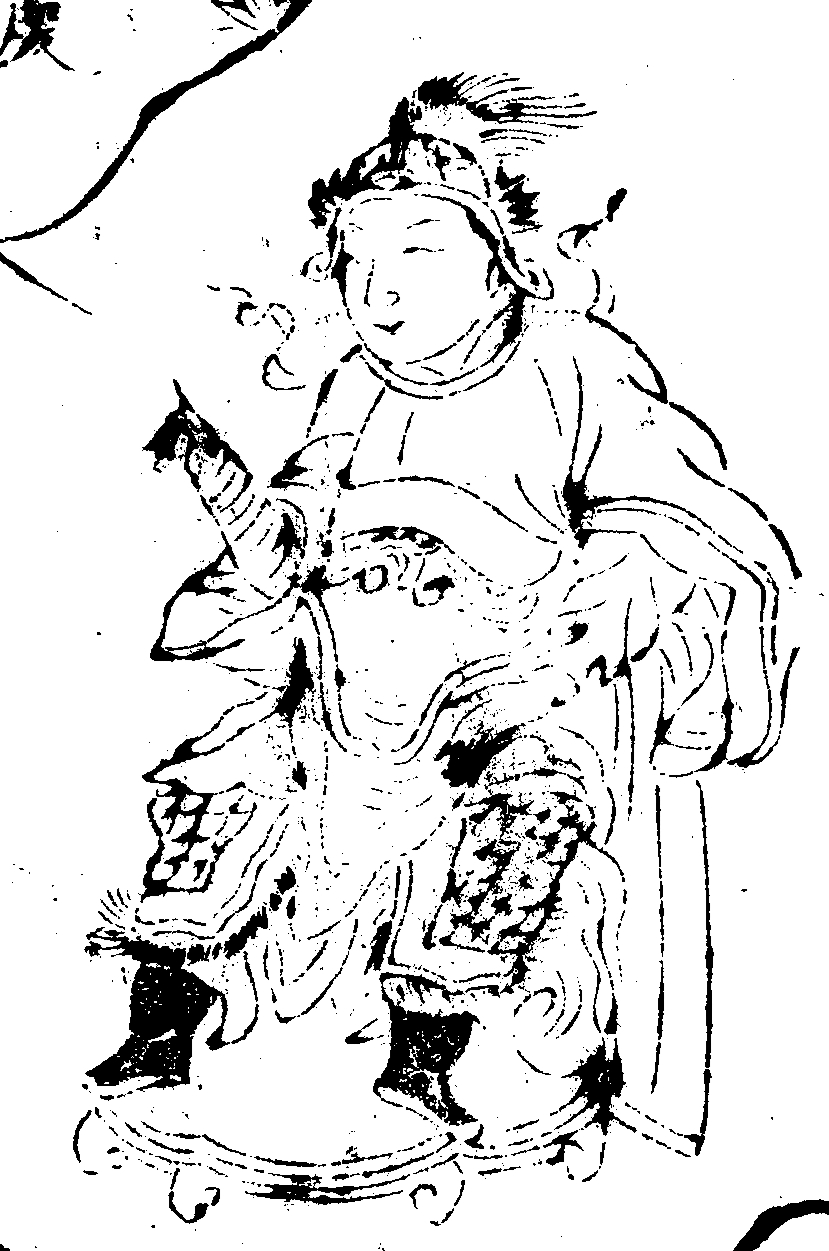
Gao Qiu as seen in the Baohan Tower edition of the Water Margin

In Water Margin, Gao Qiu is one of the chief villains of the classical novel Water Margin. Gao Qiu, who was a street punk, was even kicked out of the house by his father. Because of his good Cuju skills, he was appreciated by Emperor Huizong, who loved Cuju very much. Later, when Emperor Huizong enthroned to become the Emperor of the country, Gao Qiu made rapid advances in one's career, and was soon promoted to Grand Marshal, which was the highest official in charge of military affairs in ancient China. Once such a person is in power, he will act indiscriminately. Disregarding the original intentions of Liangshan heroes to "serve the country with all their loyalty" and "contribute to the country", he colluded with traitors and ganged up to encircle Liangshan and destroy the court to recruit peace. Gao Qiu set up a false accusation against Lin Chong who was a role of justice in Water Margin so that Lin Chong was sent to Cangzhou, which was a remote wilderness, because his adopted son Gao Yanei had a crush on Lin Chong's wife. He then sent Lu Qian to kill Lin Chong, but Lu Qian was finally killed by Lin Chong. The incident drove Lin Chong to revolt and go up to Liangshan where righteous characters in Water Margin gathered. After Liangshan grew stronger and stronger, Gao Qiu led a crusade against Liangshan and wanted to eradicate the people on Liangshan. However, he was captured alive. After Song Jiang, who was the chief of the righteous characters in the Water Margin, is summoned to settle the rebellion for the government, Gao Qiu still suspects the people of Liangshan and kills Lu Junyi and Song Jiang with poisoned wine. Ruan Xiaoqi was also deprived of office by Gao Qiu's henchmen and demoted to a civilian.

The famous critic Jin Shengtan once claimed that: "Before writing about 180 people in Water Margin, the writer first writes about Gao Qiu. You can see that there are problems in the government." Yes, after Gao Qiu was no longer in power, the same group of people, with the help of Grand Marshal Su, another upright Grand Marshal, became the backbone of the court again. The social reality that officials forced the people to rebel has once again been proved.

In Dangkouzhi, a Chinese historical novel，Gao Qiu colluded with Cai Jing, another traitor in Water Margin, to frame Liangshan, but was killed by Lei Heng and Zhu Tong. Zhu Tong gave his head to Lin Chong and wanted to cure him, but Lin Chong was mad at his head.

== See also ==
- List of Water Margin characters
