= Deng Prefecture (Shandong) =

Historical administrative division in Shandong, China

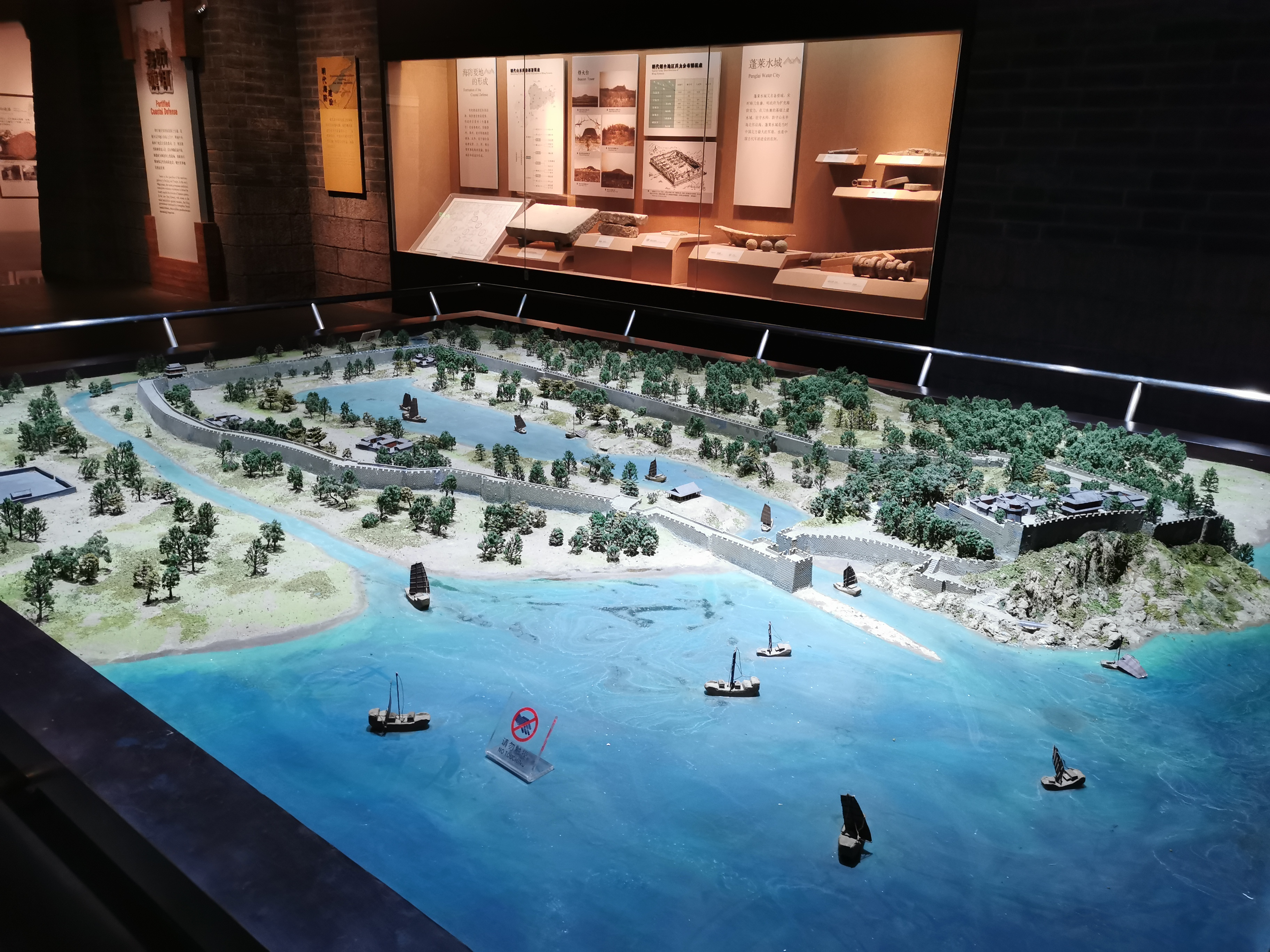
- Ancient Water Fortress of Deng Prefecture

- Map of Deng Prefecture in 1820
- Chinese: 登州
Transcriptions
Standard Mandarin
- Hanyu Pinyin: Dēng Zhōu
- Wade–Giles: Teng^{1} Chou^{1}

Deng Prefecture was a prefecture of China centering on modern Penglai, Shandong, China. It existed intermittently from 596 until 1376. After than it was upgraded to Deng Prefecture commandery (登州府) and continued to exist until 1911.

== Geography ==
The administrative region of Deng Prefecture in the Tang dynasty is in modern northeastern Shandong. It probably includes parts of modern:

- Under the administration of Yantai:
  - Yantai
  - Penglai
  - Longkou
  - Qixia
- Under the administration of Weihai:
  - Weihai
  - Rushan
  - Rongcheng

== Legacy ==
The former name of the area is preserved in Penglai's Dengzhou Subdistrict.
