= 108 Heroes =

Main characters in the novel Water Margin

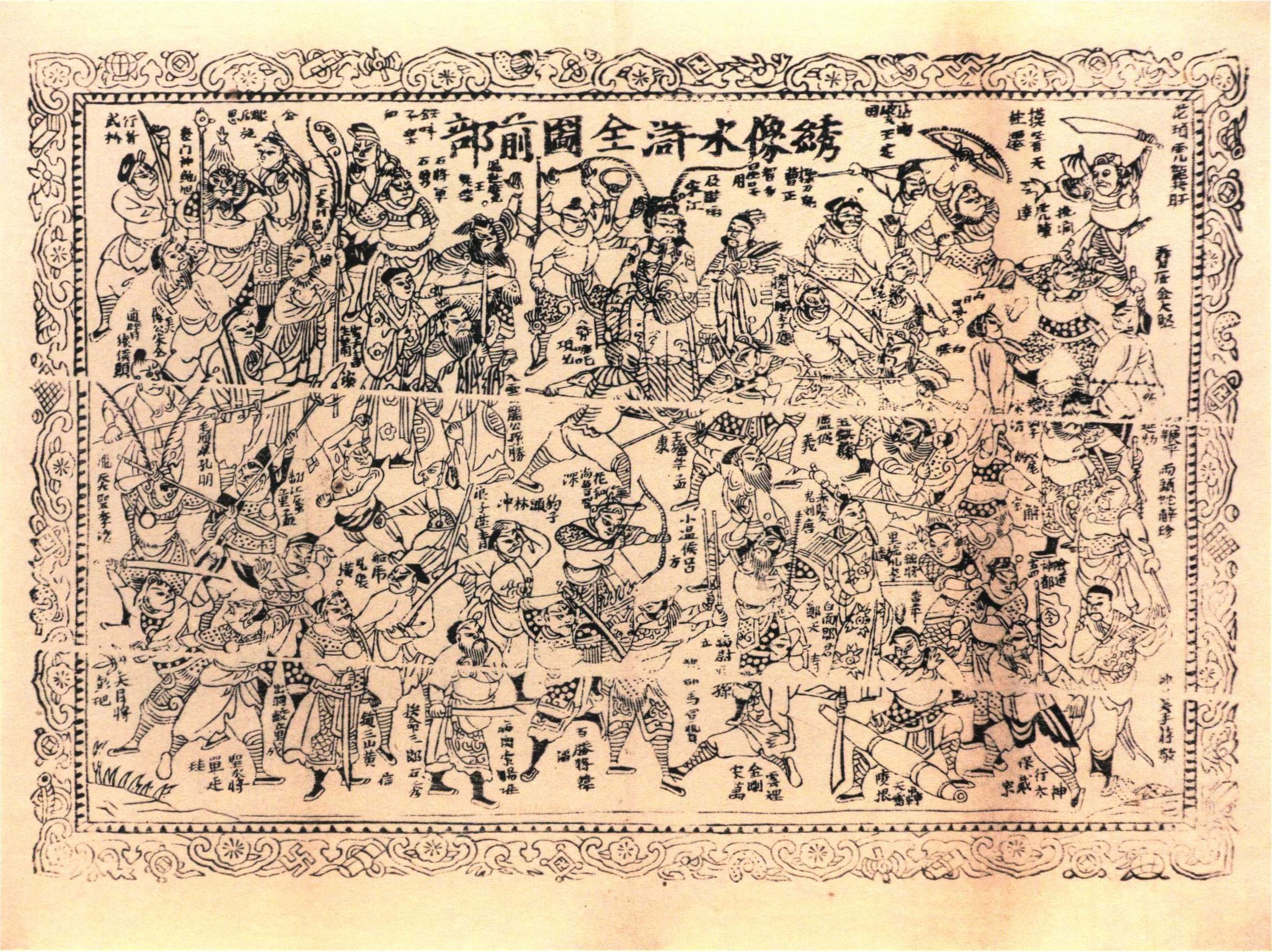
A late Qing dynasty depiction of the 108 Heroes, woodblock print.

The 108 Heroes (一百零八條好漢) are the main characters of the Chinese classical novel Water Margin, which was written in the 14th century and attributed to Shi Nai'an. The heroes are divided into the 36 Heavenly Spirits and 72 Earthly Fiends, groups that are based on a belief in Daoism that Ursa Major has 36 heavenly stars and 72 earthly stars. The 108 Heroes represent 108 demons who were banished by Shangdi, a supreme deity in Chinese folk religion. Having repented since their banishment, the demons are released from imprisonment by accident, and are reborn in the world as 108 heroes who band together for the cause of justice. The bulk of the novel describes the lives of these men and women and how they came to come together at Liangshan Marsh to rebel against the corrupt officials controlling the government of the ruling Song dynasty.

== Appearances and mentions in other stories ==
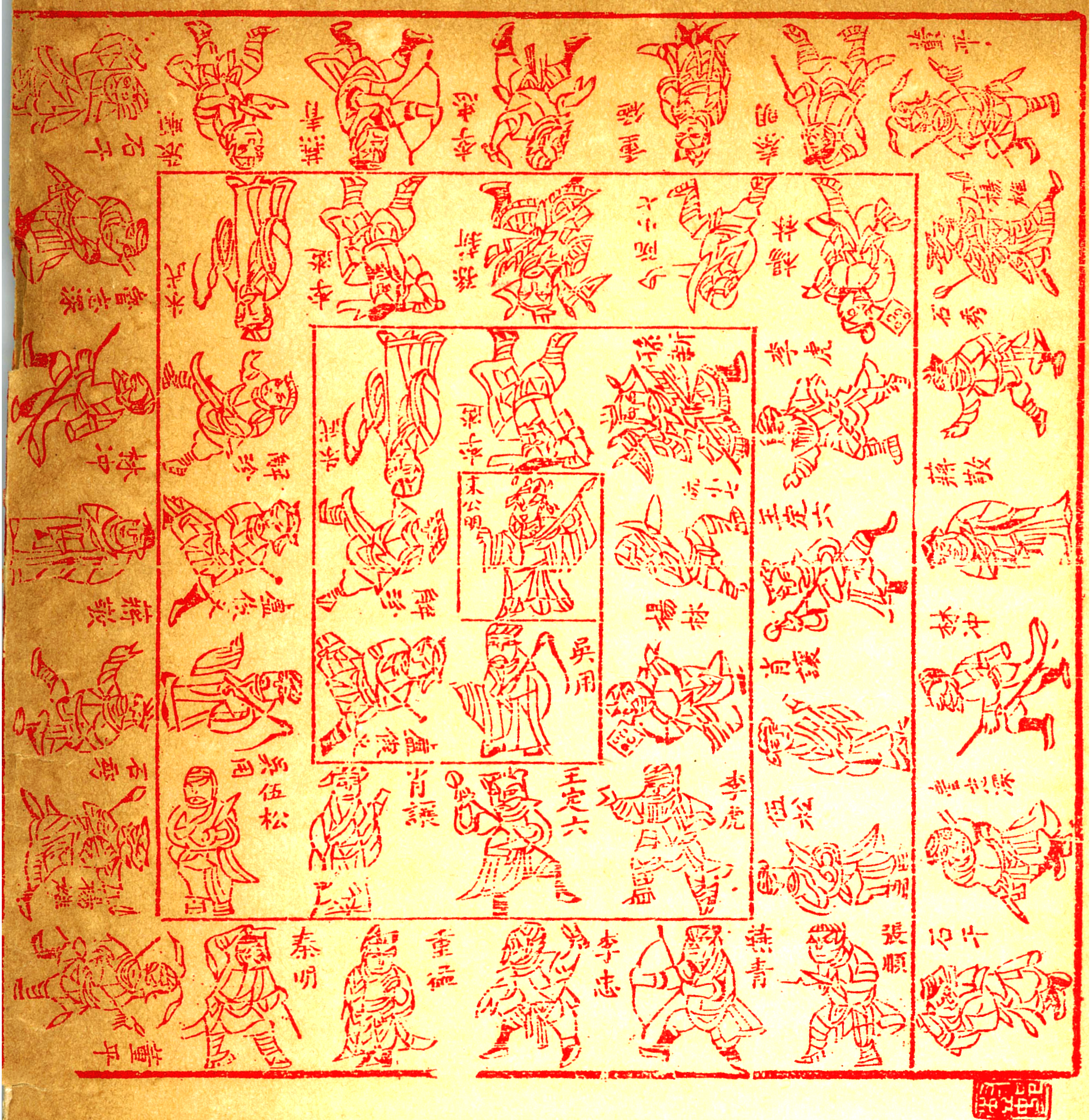
A shengguan tu board from Sichuan, based on Water Margin

The motif of pairings between 36 and 72 stars, possibly inspired from Dipper, were common among Chinese mythologies and folk tales, including Water Margin, which represented by the number of its protagonists. The religious theme of these 108 demons that incarnated into the 108 Liangshan bandits apparently drew inspiration from the 36 heavenly spirits and 72 earth fiends that also appeared in a later Chinese vernacular novel titled Fengshen Yanyi. In that novel, the 108 demons were gathered by Jiang Taigong to fight against King Zhou of Shang. Liu Ts'un-yan added that the motif of 108 stars (36 spirits and 72 fiends representatives) constellation which appeared in both works were influenced by Buddhism and Taoism.

One Heavenly Spirit, Lu Zhishen, is represented in a folktale as a sworn brother of Zhou Tong. Zai Zaotian (再造天, Rebuilding Heaven; published 1828) by Hou Zhi (侯芝, 1764–1829) mentions that Waguan Temple (瓦官寺) was once burned down by the monk Lu Zhishen but was later repaired.

According to The Oral Traditions of Yangzhou Storytelling, several popular folktales about Wu Song, a Heavenly Spirit, from the "Wang School" of Yangzhou storytelling, state that he killed the tiger "in the middle of the tenth month" of the "Xuanhe year [1119]" (the emphasis belongs to the original author).

In Louis Cha's wuxia novel The Legend of the Condor Heroes, Guo Sheng, an Earthly Fiend, is said to be the ancestor of the protagonist, Guo Jing.

=== Fictional stories and novels about Yue Fei ===
The Qing dynasty writer Qian Cai wrote the life story of Yue Fei and the outlaws Lin Chong and Lu Junyi in a spin off novel titled General Yue Fei (Chinese: 說岳全傳) (1684), which consisted of 80 chapters, stated that the latter were former students of the general's martial arts tutor, Zhou Tong. However, literary critic C. T. Hsia commented that the connection was a fictional one created by the author. Additionally, the novla mentions about the partiicipation of one of the Liangshan outlaws, Huyan Zhuo, in a campaign under the lead of Yue Fei defending against thr invasion by the Jin dynasty. The novel tell the death of Huyan Zhuo on the hands of a Jin prince, Wuzhu, amid combat.

The Republican era folktale Swordplay Under the Moon, by Wang Shaotang, further intertwines Yue Fei's history with the outlaws by adding Wu Song to the list of Zhou's former students. The tale is set in the background of Wu Song's mission to Kaifeng, prior to the murder of his brother. Zhou tutors Wu in the "rolling dragon" style of swordplay during his one-month stay in the capital city. It also said that Zhou is a sworn brother of Lu Zhishen and shares the same nickname with the executioner-turned-outlaw Cai Fu.

More Modern literary fictional biography that linked Zhou Tong with the Liangshan outlaws was Iron Arm, Golden Sabre novel in 1986, a Modern novel prequel to The Story of Yue Fei. In the novel, Sun Li, an Earthly Fiend, is portrayed as a fellow student of Luan Tingyu by Zhou Tong. This novel later adapted into a ten volume Lianhuanhua-style comic book called The Legend of Zhou Tong in 1987.

== 36 Heavenly Spirits ==
Rank (L)	Rank (HS)	Star	Name	Nickname	Other names	Division	Designation	Origin	Ancestral home / Place of origin	Chapter of first appearance	Weapon	Picture	Fate
1	1	Tiankui (天魁); Leader Star (天魁星)	Song Jiang (宋江; Sòng Jiāng; Sung Chiang)	"Protector of Righteousness" (呼保義)	Gongming (公明); "Timely Rain" (及時雨); "Filial and Righteous Dark Third Son" (孝義黑三郎); "Dark Song Jiang" (黑宋江)	Command	Commander	magistrate's clerk	Yuncheng County, Heze, Shandong	18			Poisoned
2	2	Tiangang (天罡); Strength Star (天罡星)	Lu Junyi (卢俊义; 盧俊義; Lú Jùnyì; Lu Chün-i)	"Jade Qilin" (玉麒麟)		Command	Deputy Commander	squire	Daming Prefecture (in present-day Handan, Hebei)	60	Spear, Cudgel, Pudao		Assassinated
3	3	Tianji (天機); Knowledge Star (天機星)	Wu Yong (吴用; 吳用; Wú Yòng; Wu Yung)	"Resourceful Star" (智多星)	Xuejiu (學究)	Intelligence	Chief Strategist	teacher	Yuncheng County, Heze, Shandong	14	Bronze hammer		Suicide
4	4	Tianxian (天閒); Leisure Star (天閒星)	Gongsun Sheng (公孙胜; 公孫勝; Gōngsūn Shèng; Kung-sun Sheng)	"Dragon in the Clouds" (入雲龍)		Intelligence	Chief Strategist	Taoist	Jizhou (present-day Ji County, Tianjin)	14	Sword, Taoist magic		Left before the Fang La campaign
5	5	Tianyong (天勇); Brave Star (天勇星)	Guan Sheng (关胜; 關勝; Guān Shèng; Kuan Sheng)	"Great Blade" (大刀)		Cavalry	Left General of the Five Tiger Generals	military officer	Yuncheng, Shanxi	63	Blue Dragon Crescent Moon Blade (青龍偃月刀)		Dies of illness
6	6	Tianxiong (天雄); Majestic Star (天雄星)	Lin Chong (林沖; 林沖; Lín Chōng; Lin Ch'ung)	"Panther Head" (豹子頭)	Instructor Lin (林教頭); Little Zhang Fei (小張飛)	Cavalry	Right General of the Five Tiger Generals	martial arts instructor	Dongjing (present-day Kaifeng, Henan)	7	8-foot-long (2.4 m) Snake Spear (丈八蛇矛); Pudao (朴刀)		Gets Paralysis
7	7	Tianmeng (天猛); Fierce Star (天猛星)	Qin Ming (秦明; 秦明; Qín Míng; Ch'in Ming)	"Fiery Thunderbolt" (霹靂火)		Cavalry	Vanguard General of the Five Tiger Generals	military officer	Kaizhou (believed to be present-day Puyang, Henan)	34	Wolf-toothed mace (狼牙棒)		Dies in the battle of Qingxi
8	8	Tianwei (天威); Prestige Star (天威星)	Huyan Zhuo (呼延灼; 呼延灼; Hūyán Zhuó; Hu-yen Cho)	"Double Clubs" (雙鞭)		Cavalry	Rear General of the Five Tiger Generals	military officer	Taiyuan, Shanxi	54	Pair of steel clubs		Survives
9	9	Tianying (天英); Hero Star (天英星)	Hua Rong (花荣; 花榮; Huā Róng; Hua Jung)	"Little Li Guang" (小李廣)		Cavalry	Tiger Cub Vanguard Commander	military officer	Qingfeng Fort (in present-day Qingzhou, Weifang, Shandong)	33	Spear; Bow and arrows		Suicide
10	10	Tiangui (天貴); Noble Star (天貴星)	Chai Jin (柴进; 柴進; Chái Jìn; Ch'ai Chin)	"Little Whirlwind" (小旋風)	Nobleman Chai (柴大官人); Ke Yin (柯引)	Logistics	Chief Accountant	nobleman, descendant of Chai Rong	Cangzhou, Hebei	9	Spear		Survives
11	11	Tianfu (天富); Wealth Star (天富星)	Li Ying (李应; 李應; Lǐ Yìng; Li Ying)	"Striking Hawk" (撲天雕)		Logistics	Chief Accountant	Squire	Yunzhou, Zhongshan Prefecture (around present-day Dongping County, Tai'an, Shandong)	47	Steel alloy spear (渾鐵點鋼槍); Flying daggers (飛刀)		Survives
12	12	Tianman (天滿); Fulfillment Star (天滿星)	Zhu Tong (朱仝; Zhū Tóng; Chu T'ung)	"Lord of the Beautiful Beard" (美鬚公)		Cavalry	Tiger Cub Vanguard Commander	constable	Yuncheng County, Heze, Shandong	13	Sabre		Survives
13	13	Tiangu (天孤); Solitary Star (天孤星)	Lu Zhishen (鲁智深; 魯智深; Lǔ Zhìshēn; Lu Chih-shen)	"Flowery Monk" (花和尚)	Lu Da (魯達); Major Lu (魯提轄)	Infantry	Commander	military officer	Weizhou (around present-day Pingliang, Gansu)	3	Monk's spade, Dagger		Survives
14	14	Tianshang (天傷); Harm Star (天傷星)	Wu Song (武松; Wǔ Sōng; Wu Sung)	"Pilgrim" (行者); "Tiger-fighting Hero" (打虎英雄)	Chief Wu (武都頭); Grandmaster Qingzhong (清忠祖師) "Wu the Second" (武二郎)	Infantry	Commander	constable	Qinghe County, Xingtai, Hebei	23	Pair of sabres, staff		Survives
15	15	Tianli (天立); Steadfast Star (天立星)	Dong Ping (董平; Dǒng Píng; Tung P'ing)	"General of Double Spears" (雙槍將)	"Refined and Cultured General of Double Spears" (風流雙槍將)	Cavalry	Central General of the Five Tiger Generals	military officer	Shangdang, Hedong (around present-day Yuncheng, Shanxi)	69	Pair of spears		Dies at the battle of the Dusong Pass
16	16	Tianjie (天捷); Agile Star (天捷星)	Zhang Qing (张清; 張清; Zhāng Qīng; Chang Ch'ing)	"Featherless Arrow" (沒羽箭)		Cavalry	Tiger Cub Vanguard Commander	military officer	Zhangde Prefecture (present-day Anyang, Henan)	70	Spear, Stones		Dies at the battle of the Dusong Pass
17	17	Tian'an (天暗); Dark Star (天暗星)	Yang Zhi (杨志; 楊志; Yáng Zhì; Yang Chih)	"Blue Faced Beast" (青面獸)		Cavalry	Tiger Cub Vanguard Commander	military officer	Xintai, Linzhou (present-day Shenmu County, Yulin, Shaanxi)	12	Sabre, Spear		Dies of illness
18	18	Tianyou (天祐); Guardian Star (天祐星)	Xu Ning (徐宁; 徐寧; Xú Níng; Hsü Ning)	"Gold Lancer" (金槍手)		Cavalry	Tiger Cub Vanguard Commander	martial arts instructor	Henan	56	Hooked Lance (鈎鐮槍)		Mortally wounded at the battle of Hangzhou
19	19	Tiankong (天空); Flight Star (天空星)	Suo Chao (索超; Suǒ Chāo; So Ch'ao)	"Impatient Vanguard" (急先鋒)		Cavalry	Tiger Cub Vanguard Commander	military officer	Hebei	13	Golden Axe (金蘸斧)		Dies at the battle of Hangzhou
20	20	Tiansu (天速); Speed Star (天速星)	Dai Zong (戴宗; Dài Zōng; Tai Tsung)	"Magic Traveller" (神行太保)		Reconnaissance	Scouting Chief	Prison warden	Jiangzhou (江州; present-day Jiujiang, Jiangxi)	38	Sword		Survives
21	21	Tianyi (天異); Deviance Star (天異星)	Liu Tang (刘唐; 劉唐; Liú Táng; Liu T'ang)	"Red Haired Devil" (赤髮鬼)		Infantry	Commander	smuggler	Dongluzhou (東潞州; believed to be present-day Changzhi, Shanxi)	14	Pudao		Dies in the battle of Hangzhou
22	22	Tiansha (天殺); Killer Star (天殺星)	Li Kui (李逵; Lǐ Kuí; Li K'uei)	"Black Whirlwind" (黑旋風)	"Iron Ox" (鐵牛)	Infantry	Commander	jailer	Baizhang Village, Yishui County, Yizhou (in present-day Linyi, Shandong)	37	Pair of axes, Pudao		Poisoned
23	23	Tianwei (天微); Minute Star (天微星)	Shi Jin (史进; 史進; Shǐ Jìn; Shih Chin)	"Nine Tattooed Dragons" (九紋龍)		Cavalry	Tiger Cub Vanguard Commander	village headman	Huayin County (present-day Huayin, Weinan, Shaanxi)	2	Staff, Pudao		Dies at the battle of the Yuling Pass
24	24	Tianjiu (天究); Investigative Star (天究星)	Mu Hong (穆弘; Mù Hóng; Mu Hung)	"Unrestrained" (沒遮攔)		Cavalry	Tiger Cub Vanguard Commander	scion	Jieyang Town (believed to be in present-day Jiujiang, Jiangxi)	37	Pudao		
25	25	Tiantui (天退); Retreat Star (天退星)	Lei Heng (雷横; 雷橫; Léi Héng; Lei Heng)	"Winged Tiger" (插翅虎)		Infantry	Commander	blacksmith, constable	Yuncheng County, Heze, Shandong	13	Pudao		
26	26	Tianshou (天壽); Longevity Star (天壽星)	Li Jun (李俊; Lǐ Jùn; Li Chün)	"River Dragon" (混江龍)		Navy	Commander	salt smuggler	Luzhou (present-day Hefei, Anhui)	36	Sword		
27	27	Tianjian (天劍); Sword Star (天劍星)	Ruan Xiao'er (阮小二; Ruǎn Xiǎo'èr; Juan Hsiao-erh)	"Tai Sui Who Stands His Ground" (立地太歲)		Navy	Commander	fisherman	Shijie Village (in present-day Liangshan County, Jining, Shandong)	15			
28	28	Tianping (天平); Balance Star (天平星)	Zhang Heng (张横; 張橫; Zhāng Héng; Chang Heng)	"Boatman" (船火兒)		Navy	Commander	pirate	Xiaogushan (in present-day Susong County, Anqing, Anhui)	37			
29	29	Tianzui (天罪); Guilt Star (天罪星)	Ruan Xiaowu (阮小五; Ruǎn Xiǎowǔ; Juan Hsiao-wu)	"Short-lived Second Brother" (短命二郎)		Navy	Commander	fisherman	Shijie Village (in present-day Liangshan County, Jining, Shandong)	15			
30	30	Tiansun (天損); Damage Star (天損星)	Zhang Shun (张顺; 張順; Zhāng Shùn; Chang Shun)	"White Jumping in the Waves" (浪裡白跳)		Navy	Commander	fisherman	Xiaogushan (in present-day Susong County, Anqing, Anhui)	37			
31	31	Tianbai (天敗); Defeat Star (天敗星)	Ruan Xiaoqi (阮小七; Ruǎn Xiǎoqī; Juan Hsiao-ch'i)	"Living King Yama (活閻羅)		Navy	Commander	fisherman	Shijie Village (in present-day Liangshan County, Jining, Shandong)	15			
32	32	Tianlao (天牢); Secure Star (天牢星)	Yang Xiong (杨雄; 楊雄; Yáng Xióng; Yang Hsiung)	"Sick Guan Suo" (病關索)		Infantry	Commander	prison warden, executioner	Henan	44			
33	33	Tianhui (天慧); Wisdom Star (天慧星)	Shi Xiu (石秀; Shí Xiù; Shih Hsiu)	"Daredevil Third Brother" (拚命三郎)		Infantry	Commander	firewood seller	Jiankang Prefecture, Jinling (present-day Nanjing, Jiangsu)	44			
34	34	Tianbao (天暴); Savage Star (天暴星)	Xie Zhen (解珍; Xiè Zhēn; Hsieh Chen)	"Double-headed Serpent" (兩頭蛇)		Infantry	Commander	hunter	Dengzhou (in present-day eastern Shandong)	49	Bronze forked spear (渾鐵點鋼叉)		
35	35	Tianku (天哭); Crying Star (天哭星)	Xie Bao (解宝; 解寶; Xiè Bǎo; Hsieh Pao)	"Twin-tailed Scorpion" (雙尾蠍)		Infantry	Commander	hunter	Dengzhou (in present-day eastern Shandong)	49	Bronze forked spear (渾鐵點鋼叉)		
36	36	Tianqiao (天巧); Skilful Star (天巧星)	Yan Qing (燕青; Yàn Qīng; Yen Ch'ing)	"Prodigal" / "Wanderer" (浪子)		Infantry	Commander	Lu Junyi's steward	Daming Prefecture (in present-day Handan, Hebei)	60	Crossbow		

== 72 Earthly Fiends ==
Rank (L)	Rank (EF)	Star	Name	Nickname	Division	Designation	Origin	Ancestral home / Place of origin	Chapter of first appearance	Weapon	Picture
37	1	Dikui (地魁); Leader Star (地魁星)	Zhu Wu (朱武; Zhū Wǔ; Chu Wu)	"Resourceful Strategist" (神機軍師)	Intelligence	Strategist	outlaw	Dingyuan (present-day Dingyuan County, Chuzhou, Anhui)	2	Pair of swords	
38	2	Disha (地煞); Malignant Star (地煞星)	Huang Xin (黄信; 黃信; Huáng Xìn; Huang Hsin)	"Guardian of Three Mountains" (鎮三山)	Cavalry	Tiger Cub Patrol Commander	military officer	Qingzhou (in present-day Shandong)	33	Sword of Death (喪門劍)	
39	3	Diyong (地勇); Brave Star (地勇星)	Sun Li (孙立; 孫立; Sūn Lì; Sun Li)	"Sick Yuchi" (病尉遲)	Cavalry	Tiger Cub Patrol Commander	military officer	Qiongzhou (present-day Hainan)	49	Spear, Steel clubs	
40	4	Dijie (地傑); Prominence Star (地傑星)	Xuan Zan (宣赞; 宣贊; Xuān Zàn; Hsüan Tsan)	"Ugly Prince Consort" (醜郡馬)	Cavalry	Tiger Cub Patrol Commander	military officer		63	Sabre	
41	5	Dixiong (地雄); Magnificent Star (地雄星)	Hao Siwen (郝思文; Hǎo Sīwén; Hao Szu-wen)	"Wood Dog of Well" (井木犴)	Cavalry	Tiger Cub Patrol Commander	military officer		63		
42	6	Diwei (地威); Majestic Star (地威星)	Han Tao (韩滔; 韓滔; Hán Tāo; Han T'ao)	"General of a Hundred Victories" (百勝將)	Cavalry	Tiger Cub Patrol Commander	military officer	Dongjing (present-day Kaifeng, Henan)	55		
43	7	Diying (地英); Hero Star (地英星)	Peng Qi (彭玘; Péng Qǐ; P'eng Ch'i)	"General of Heavenly Vision" (天目將)	Cavalry	Tiger Cub Patrol Commander	military officer	Dongjing (present-day Kaifeng, Henan)	55	Sabre (三尖兩刃刀)	
44	8	Diqi (地奇); Unique Star (地奇星)	Shan Tinggui (单廷圭; 單廷珪; Shàn Tíngguī; Shan T'ing-kui)	"General of Sacred Water" (聖水將軍)	Cavalry	Tiger Cub Patrol Commander	military officer	Lingzhou (present-day Ling County, Dezhou, Shandong)	67	Black spear, Bow and arrows	
45	9	Dimeng (地猛); Fierce Star (地猛星)	Wei Dingguo (魏定国; 魏定國; Wèi Dìngguó; Wei Ting-kuo)	"General of Holy Fire" (神火將軍)	Cavalry	Tiger Cub Patrol Commander	military officer	Lingzhou (present-day Ling County, Dezhou, Shandong)	67	Sabre, Bow and arrows	
46	10	Diwen (地文); Literature Star (地文星)	Xiao Rang (萧让; 蕭讓; Xiāo Ràng; Hsiao Jang)	"Sacred Handed Scholar" (聖手書生)	Administration	Chief Secretary	scholar, calligrapher	Jizhou (around present-day Jining and Heze, Shandong)	39		
47	11	Dizheng (地正); Upright Star (地正星)	Pei Xuan (裴宣; Péi Xuān; P'ei Hsüan)	"Iron Faced Magistrate's Clerk" (鐵面孔目)	Administration	Chief Justice	magistrate's clerk	Jingzhao Prefecture (around present-day Xi'an, Shaanxi)	44		
48	12	Dikuo (地闊); Wide Star (地闊星)	Ou Peng (欧鹏; 歐鵬; Ōu Péng; Ou P'eng)	"Golden Wings Brushing Against the Clouds" (摩雲金翅)	Cavalry	Tiger Cub Patrol Commander	outlaw	Huangzhou (in present-day Huanggang, Hubei)	41		
49	13	Dihe (地闔); Whole Star (地闔星)	Deng Fei (邓飞; 鄧飛; Dèng Fēi; Teng Fei)	"Fiery Eyed Suan-ni" (火眼狻猊)	Cavalry	Tiger Cub Patrol Commander	outlaw	Xiangyang, Hubei	44	Iron chain with spikes	
50	14	Diqiang (地強); Strong Star (地強星)	Yan Shun (燕顺; 燕順; Yàn Shùn; Yen Shun)	"Multicoloured Tiger" (錦毛虎)	Cavalry	Tiger Cub Patrol Commander	outlaw	Laizhou (around present-day Yantai, Shandong)	32	Sabre	
51	15	Di'an (地暗); Dark Star (地暗星)	Yang Lin (杨林; 楊林; Yáng Lín; Yang Lin)	"Multicoloured Leopard" (錦豹子)	Cavalry	Tiger Cub Patrol Commander	outlaw	Zhangde Prefecture (present-day Anyang, Henan)	44	Iron spear	
52	16	Dizhou (地軸); Axis Star (地軸星)	Ling Zhen (凌振; Líng Zhèn; Ling Chen)	"Heaven Shaking Thunder" (轟天雷)	Artillery	Commander	military officer	Yanling (believed to be present-day Yanling County, Xuchang, Henan)	55	Cannon, Spear	
53	17	Dihui (地會); Meet Star (地會星)	Jiang Jing (蒋敬; 蔣敬; Jiǎng Jìng; Chiang Ching)	"Divine Mathematician" (神算子)	Logistics	Accountant	outlaw	Tanzhou, Hunan	41		
54	18	Dizuo (地佐); Aid Star (地佐星)	Lü Fang (吕方; 呂方; Lǚ Fāng; Lü Fang)	"Little Marquis of Wen" (小溫侯)	Cavalry	Central Camp Guardian	outlaw	Tanzhou (around present-day Changsha, Hunan)	35	Sky Piercer (方天畫戟)	
55	19	Diyou (地祐); Help Star (地祐星)	Guo Sheng (郭盛; Guō Shèng; Kuo Sheng)	"Comparable to Rengui" (賽仁貴)	Cavalry	Central Camp Guardian	outlaw	Jialing (present-day Jialing District, Nanchong, Sichuan)	35	"Sky Piercer" (方天畫戟)	
56	20	Diling (地靈); Efficacious Star (地靈星)	An Daoquan (安道全; Ān Dàoquán; An Tao-ch'üan)	"Divine Physician" (神醫)	Medical	Physician	physician	Jiankang Prefecture (present-day Nanjing, Jiangsu)	65		
57	21	Dishou (地獸); Beast Star (地獸星)	Huangfu Duan (皇甫端; Huángfǔ Duān; Huang-fu Tuan)	"Purple Bearded Count" (紫髯伯)	Medical	veterinarian	veterinarian	Youzhou (present-day Beijing)	70		
58	22	Diwei (地微); Minute Star (地微星)	Wang Ying (王英; Wáng Yīng; Wang Ying)	"Stumpy Tiger" (矮腳虎)	Cavalry	Commander	outlaw	Huai River region	31		
59	23	Dihui (地慧); Bright Star (地慧星)	Hu Sanniang (扈三娘; Hù Sānniáng; Hu San-niang)	"Ten Feet of Blue" (一丈青)	Cavalry	Commander	village headman's daughter	Yunzhou, Zhongshan Prefecture (around present-day Dongping County, Tai'an, Shandong)	47	Pair of sabres, Lasso	
60	24	Dibao (地暴); Savage Star (地暴星)	Bao Xu (鲍旭; 鮑旭; Bào Xù; Pao Hsü)	"God of Death" (喪門神)	Infantry	Commander	outlaw	Kouzhou (believed to be present-day Guan County, Liaocheng, Shandong)	67	Sword (闊刃劍)	
61	25	Diran (地然); Correct Star (地然星)	Fan Rui (樊瑞; Fán Ruì; Fan Jui)	"Demon King of Chaos" (混世魔王)	Infantry	Commander	outlaw	Puzhou (in present-day Chongqing)	60	Chain spiked mace (流星槌)	
62	26	Dichang (地猖); Wild Star (地猖星)	Kong Ming (孔明; Kǒng Míng; K'ung Ming)	"Hairy Star" (毛頭星)	Infantry	Central Camp Guardian	scion	Qingzhou (in present-day Shandong)	57	Spear	
63	27	Dikuang (地狂); Crazy Star (地狂星)	Kong Liang (孔亮; Kǒng Liàng; K'ung Liang)	"Lonely Fiery Star" (獨火星)	Infantry	Central Camp Guardian	scion	Qingzhou (in present-day Shandong)	57	Spear	
64	28	Difei (地飛); Flying Star (地飛星)	Xiang Chong (项充; 項充; Xiàng Chōng; Hsiang Ch'ung)	"Eight-armed Nezha" (八臂哪吒)	Infantry	Commander	outlaw	Pei County, Xuzhou	59	Spear, Flying daggers	
65	29	Dizou (地走); Walking Star (地走星)	Li Gun (李衮; 李袞; Lǐ Gǔn; Li Kun)	"Sky Soaring Great Sage" (飛天大聖)	Infantry	Commander	outlaw	Pei County, Xuzhou	59	Sword, Javelins	
66	30	Diqiao (地巧); Skilful Star (地巧星)	Jin Dajian (金大坚; 金大堅; Jīn Dàjiān; Chin Ta-chien)	"Jade Armed Craftsman" (玉臂匠)	Administration	Head Craftsman	craftsman	Jizhou (around present-day Jining and Heze, Shandong)	39		
67	31	Diming (地明); Bright Star (地明星)	Ma Lin (马麟; 馬麟; Mǎ Lín; Ma Lin)	"Iron Flute Deity" (鐵笛仙)	Cavalry	Tiger Cub Patrol Commander	outlaw	Jiankang Prefecture (present-day Nanjing, Jiangsu)	41	Pair of sabres	
68	32	Dijin (地進); Forward Star (地進星)	Tong Wei (童威; Tóng Wēi; T'ung Wei)	"Dragon Emerging from a Cave" (出洞蛟)	Navy	Commander	salt smuggler	Jieyang Ridge (believed to be in present-day Jiujiang, Jiangxi)	37		
69	33	Ditui (地退); Retreating Star (地退星)	Tong Meng (童猛; Tóng Měng; T'ung Meng)	"River Churning Clam" (翻江蜃)	Navy	Commander	salt smuggler	Jieyang Ridge (believed to be in present-day Jiujiang, Jiangxi)	37		
70	34	Diman (地滿); Full Star (地滿星)	Meng Kang (孟康; Mèng Kāng; Meng K'ang)	"Jade Flagpole" (玉幡竿)	Logistics	Chief Shipwright	outlaw	Zhending Prefecture (around present-day Zhengding County, Shijiazhuang, Hebei)	44		
71	35	Disui (地遂); Succeed Star (地遂星)	Hou Jian (侯健; Hóu Jiàn; Hou Chien)	"Interconnected-Arm Gibbon" (通臂猿)	Logistics	Chief Tailor	tailor	Hongdu (present-day Nanchang, Jiangxi)	41		
72	36	Dizhou (地周); Complete Star (地周星)	Chen Da (陈达; 陳達; Chén Dá; Ch'en Ta)	"Stream Leaping Tiger" (跳澗虎)	Cavalry	Tiger Cub Patrol Commander	outlaw	Ye (in present-day Handan, Hebei)	2	Iron spear	
73	37	Diyin (地隱); Latent Star (地隱星)	Yang Chun (杨春; 楊春; Yáng Chūn; Yang Ch'un)	"White Flower Serpent" (白花蛇)	Cavalry	Tiger Cub Patrol Commander	outlaw	Jieliang, Puzhou (present-day Jiezhou Town, Yanhu District, Yuncheng, Shanxi)	2	Sabre	
74	38	Diyi (地異); Different Star (地異星)	Zheng Tianshou (郑天寿; 鄭天壽; Zhèng Tiānshòu; Cheng T'ien-shou)	"Fair Skinned Gentleman" (白面郎君)	Infantry	Commander	outlaw	Suzhou, Jiangsu	32		
75	39	Dili (地理); Manage Star (地理星)	Tao Zongwang (陶宗旺; Táo Zōngwàng; T'ao Tsung-wang)	"Nine-Tailed Turtle" (九尾龜)	Logistics	Construction Supervisor	outlaw	Guangzhou (around present-day Huangchuan County, Xinyang, Henan)	41	Iron shovel	
76	40	Dijun (地俊); Handsome Star (地俊星)	Song Qing (宋清; Sòng Qīng; Sung Ch'ing)	"Iron Fan" (鐵扇子)	Logistics	Banquet Organiser	farmer	Yuncheng County, Heze, Shandong	18		
77	41	Diyue (地樂); Music Star (地樂星)	Yue He (乐和; 樂和; Yuè Hé; Yüeh He)	"Iron Whistle" (鐵叫子)	Infantry	Commander	jailer	Maozhou (present-day Changyi, Weifang, Shandong)	49		
78	42	Dijie (地捷); Victorious Star (地捷星)	Gong Wang (龚旺; 龔旺; Gōng Wàng; Kung Wang)	"Flowery Necked Tiger" (花項虎)	Infantry	Commander	military officer	Dongchang Prefecture (present-day Dongchangfu, Liaocheng, Shandong	70	Spear	
79	43	Disu (地速); Speed Star (地速星)	Ding Desun (丁得孙; 丁得孫; Dīng Désūn; Ting Te-sun)	"Arrow-hit Tiger" (中箭虎)	Infantry	Commander	military officer	Dongchang Prefecture (present-day Dongchangfu, Liaocheng, Shandong	70	Forked spear	
80	44	Dizhen (地鎮); Guardian Star (地鎮星)	Mu Chun (穆春; Mù Chūn; Mu Ch'un)	"Little Restrained" (小遮攔)	Infantry	Commander	scion	Jieyang Town (believed to be in present-day Jiujiang, Jiangxi)	36	Sabre	
81	45	Diji (地稽); Check Star (地稽星)	Cao Zheng (曹正; Cáo Zhèng; Ts'ao Cheng)	"Knife Wielding Demon" (操刀鬼)	Logistics	Head Butcher	butcher	Kaifeng	17		
82	46	Dimo (地魔); Devil Star (地魔星)	Song Wan (宋万; 宋萬; Sòng Wàn; Sung Wan)	"Giant in the Clouds" (雲裏金剛)	Infantry	Commander	outlaw		11		
83	47	Diyao (地妖); Demon Star (地妖星)	Du Qian (杜迁; 杜遷; Dù Qiān; Tu Ch'ien)	"Touching the Sky" (摸着天)	Infantry	Commander	outlaw		11		
84	48	Diyou (地幽); Tranquil Star (地幽星)	Xue Yong (薛永; Xuē Yǒng; Hsüeh Yung)	"Sick Tiger" (病大蟲)	Infantry	Commander	medicine peddler	Luoyang, Henan	36		
85	49	Difu (地伏); Concealment Star (地伏星)	Shi En (施恩; Shī Ēn; Shih En)	"Golden Eyed Tiger Cub" (金眼彪)	Infantry	Commander	prison warden	Mengzhou, Jiaozuo, Henan	28		
86	50	Dipi (地僻); Remote Star (地僻星)	Li Zhong (李忠; Lǐ Zhōng; Li Chung)	"Tiger Slaying General" (打虎將)	Infantry	Commander	medicine peddler	Haozhou (present-day Fengyang County, Anhui)	3		
87	51	Dikong (地空); Empty Star (地空星)	Zhou Tong (周通; Zhōu Tōng; Chou T'ung)	"Little Conqueror" (小覇王)	Cavalry	Tiger Cub Patrol Commander	outlaw	Qingzhou (in present-day Shandong)	5	Spear (走水綠沉槍)	
88	52	Digu (地孤); Solitary Star (地孤星)	Tang Long (汤隆; 湯隆; Tāng Lóng; T'ang Lung)	"Gold Coin Spotted Leopard" (金錢豹子)	Logistics	Chief Armourer	blacksmith	Yan'an, Shaanxi	54		
89	53	Diquan (地全); Complete Star (地全星)	Du Xing (杜兴; 杜興; Dù Xīng; Tu Hsing)	"Demon Face" (鬼臉兒)	Reconnaissance	Commander	Li Ying's steward	Zhongshan (present-day Dingzhou, Hebei)	46		
90	54	Diduan (地短); Short Star (地短星)	Zou Yuan (邹渊; 鄒淵; Zōu Yuān; Tsou Yüan)	"Forest Emerging Dragon" (出林龍)	Infantry	Commander	outlaw	Laizhou, Yantai, Shandong	49	Flying Tiger Staff (飛虎棒)	
91	55	Dijiao (地角); Horn Star (地角星)	Zou Run (邹润; 鄒潤; Zōu Rùn; Tsou Jun)	"Single Horned Dragon" (獨角龍)	Infantry	Commander	outlaw	Laizhou, Yantai, Shandong	49		
92	56	Diqiu (地囚); Prisoner Star (地囚星)	Zhu Gui (朱贵; 朱貴; Zhū Guì; Chu Kui)	"Dry Land Alligator" (旱地忽律)	Reconnaissance	Commander	outlaw	Yishui County, Yizhou (in present-day Linyi, Shandong)	11		
93	57	Dicang (地藏); Hidden Star (地藏星)	Zhu Fu (朱富; Zhū Fù; Chu Fu)	"Sneering Tiger" (笑面虎)	Logistics	Brewery Master	tavern owner	Yishui County, Yizhou (in present-day Linyi, Shandong)	43		
94	58	Diping (地平); Level Star (地平星)	Cai Fu (蔡福; Cài Fú; Ts'ai Fu)	"Iron Arm" (鐵臂膊)	Administration	Chief Executioner	jailer, executioner	Daming Prefecture (in present-day Handan, Hebei)	62		
95	59	Disun (地損); Harm Star (地損星)	Cai Qing (蔡庆; 蔡慶; Cài Qìng; Ts'ai Ch'ing)	"Stalk of Flower" (一枝花)	Administration	Chief Executioner	jailer, executioner	Daming Prefecture (in present-day Handan, Hebei)	62		
96	60	Dinu (地奴); Slave Star (地奴星)	Li Li (李立; Lǐ Lì; Li Li)	"Life Taking Judge" (催命判官)	Reconnaissance	Commander	tavern owner	Luzhou (present-day Hefei, Anhui)	36		
97	61	Dicha (地察); Detective Star (地察星)	Li Yun (李云; 李雲; Lǐ Yún; Li Yün)	"Green Eyed Tiger" (青眼虎)	Logistics	Construction Supervisor	constable	Yishui County, Yizhou (in present-day Linyi, Shandong)	43	Sabre	
98	62	Di'e (地惡); Evil Star (地惡星)	Jiao Ting (焦挺; Jiāo Tǐng; Chiao T'ing)	"Faceless" (沒面目)	Infantry	Commander	wrestler	Zhongshan Prefecture (around present-day Dingzhou, Baoding, Hebei)	67		
99	63	Dichou (地丑); Ugly Star (地丑星)	Shi Yong (石勇; Shí Yǒng; Shih Yung)	"Stone General/ General Shi" (石將軍)	Infantry	Commander	gambler	Daming Prefecture (in present-day Handan, Hebei)	35		
100	64	Dishu (地數); Number Star (地數星)	Sun Xin (孙新; 孫新; Sūn Xīn; Sun Hsin)	"Little Yuchi" (小尉遲)	Reconnaissance	Commander	tavern owner	Qiongzhou (present-day Hainan)	49		
101	65	Diyin (地陰); Yin Star (地陰星)	Gu Dasao (顾大嫂; 顧大嫂; Gù Dàsǎo; Ku Ta-sao)	"Female Elder Tiger" (母大蟲)	Reconnaissance	Commander	tavern owner	Dengzhou (present-day Penglai District, Yantai, Shandong)	49		
102	66	Dixing (地刑); Execute Star (地刑星)	Zhang Qing (张青; 張青; Zhāng Qīng; Chang Ch'ing)	"Gardener" (菜園子)	Reconnaissance	Commander	tavern owner	Mengzhou, Jiaozuo, Henan	17		
103	67	Dizhuang (地壯); Strong Star (地壯星)	Sun Erniang (孙二娘; 孫二娘; Sūn Èrniáng; Sun Erh-niang)	"Female Yaksha" (母夜叉)	Reconnaissance	Commander	tavern owner		17		
104	68	Dilie (地劣); Inferior Star (地劣星)	Wang Dingliu (王定六; Wáng Dìngliù; Wang Ting-liu)	"Living Goddess of Lightning" (活閃婆)	Reconnaissance	Commander	tavern owner	Jiankang Prefecture (present-day Nanjing, Jiangsu)	65		
105	69	Dijian (地健); Healthy Star (地健星)	Yu Baosi (郁保四; Yù Bǎosì; Yü Pao-szu)	"God of the Dangerous Road" (險道神)	Infantry	Chief Flag-bearer	outlaw	Qingzhou, Shandong	68		
106	70	Dihao (地耗); Rat Star (地耗星)	Bai Sheng (白胜; 白勝; Bái Shèng; Pai Sheng)	"Daylight Rat" (白日鼠)	Infantry	Commander	gambler	Anle Village, Yuncheng County, Shandong	16		
107	71	Dizei (地賊); Thief Star (地賊星)	Shi Qian (时迁; 時遷; Shí Qiān; Shih Ch'ien)	"Flea on a Drum" (鼓上蚤)	Infantry	Commander	thief, tomb raider	Gaotangzhou (present-day Gaotang County, Shandong)	46	Pudao	
108	72	Digou (地狗); Hound Star (地狗星)	Duan Jingzhu (段景住; Duàn Jǐngzhù; Tuan Ching-chu)	"Golden Haired Hound" (金毛犬)	Infantry	Commander	horse thief	Zhuozhou, Hebei	60		

== Bibliography ==
- (in Chinese) Li, Mengxia. 108 Heroes from the Water Margin, page 27. EPB Publishers Pte Ltd, 1992. ISBN 9971 0 0252 3.
