= Zou Run =

Fictional character in the Chinese classical novel Water Margin

- Water Margin character
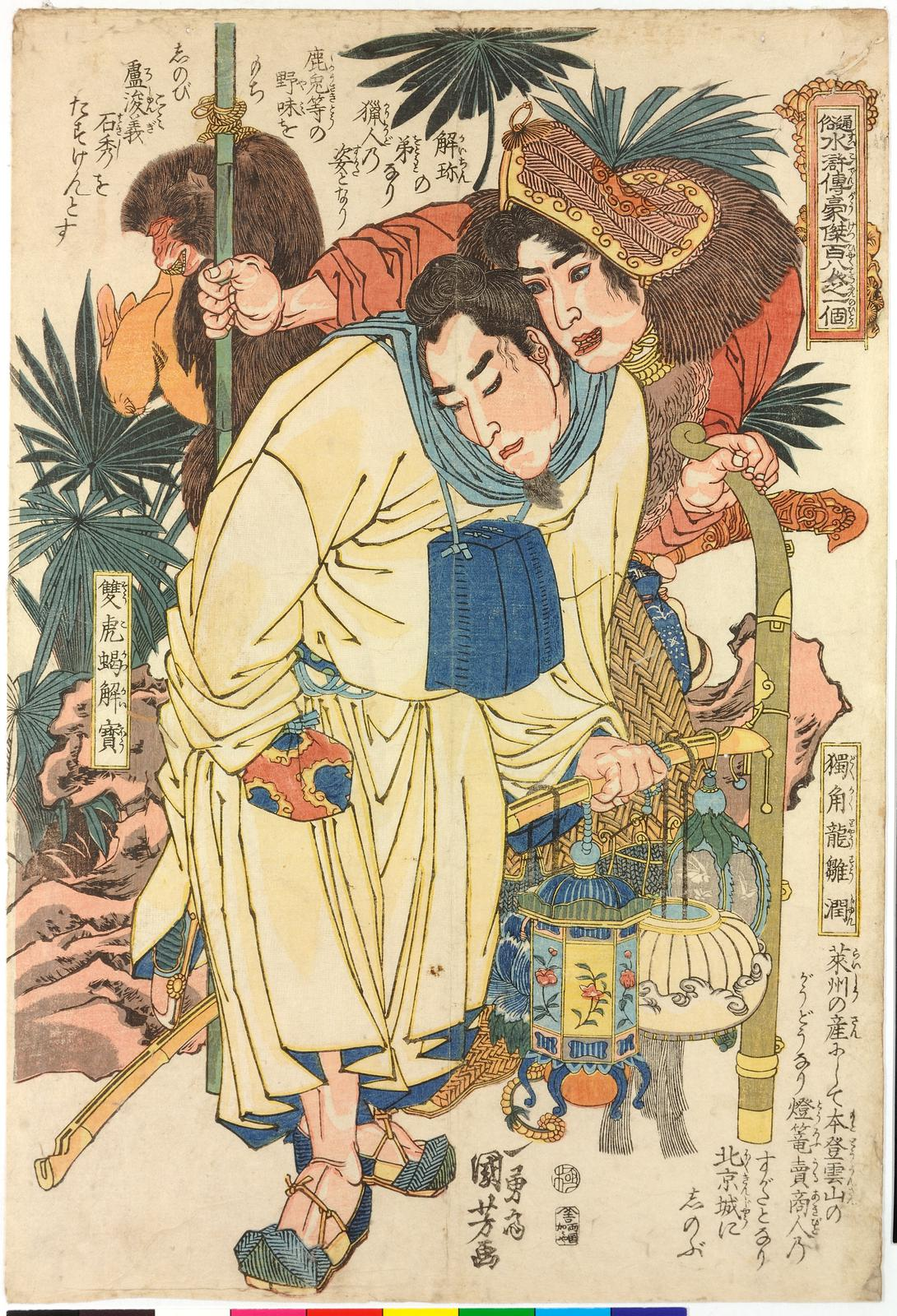
- an illustration of Zou Run (in yellow) and Xie Bao (in red) by Utagawa Kuniyoshi
- First appearance: Chapter 49

In-universe information
- Nickname: "Single Horned Dragon" 獨角龍
- Origin: outlaw
- Designation: Infantry Commander of Liangshan
- Rank: 91st, Horn Star (地角星) of the 72 Earthly Fiends
- Ancestral home / Place of origin: Laizhou, Shandong

Chinese names
- Simplified Chinese: 邹润
- Traditional Chinese: 鄒潤
- Pinyin: Zōu Rùn
- Wade–Giles: Tsou Jun

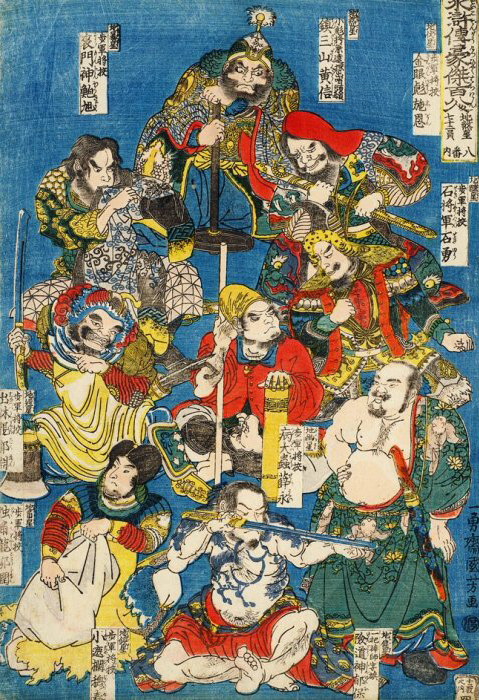
An illustration of nine of the 108 Heroes by Utagawa Kuniyoshi. Xue Yong is in the centre. The rest are (clockwise from top): Huang Xin, Shi En, Shi Yong, Yu Baosi, Mu Chun, Zou Run, Zou Yuan, and Bao Xu.

Zou Run is a fictional character in Water Margin, one of the Classic Chinese Novels. Nicknamed "Single Horned Dragon", he ranks 91st among the 108 Heroes and 55th among the 72 Earthly Fiends.

== Background ==
The novel describes Zou Run as a burly man with a peculiar appearance. Nicknamed "Single Horned Dragon" for a large bump on his head, he once headbutted a tree trunk in a fit of anger during a quarrel and knocked down the tree, shocking everyone who witnessed it. Zou Run and his uncle Zou Yuan, who is around the same age as him, lead a small band of 80 to 90 outlaws at Cloud Ascending Hill (登雲山) near Laizhou, where they rob the rich to help the poor. The Zous are also close acquaintances of Sun Xin, Yang Lin, Deng Fei and Shi Yong, all of whom eventually join the outlaw band at Liangshan Marsh.

== Rescuing the Xie brothers ==
The Zou uncle–nephew duo is first introduced in the novel when they are invited to join a group planning to carry out a prison raid to save the brothers Xie Zhen and Xie Bao, who have been framed for theft and imprisoned in Dengzhou (登州; around present-day Penglai, Shandong). The other members of the group are Gu Dasao, the Xie brothers' cousin; Sun Xin, Gu Dasao's husband; Sun Li, Sun Xin's elder brother who is serving as a military officer in Dengzhou; and Yue He, a jailer who is the younger brother of Sun Li's wife. The Zous agree to participate in the prison raid.

On the night of the prison raid, Yue He secretly lets Gu Dasao into the prison under the pretence of delivering food to prisoners. While Gu Dasao works with the Zous and the others to wreak havoc inside and outside the prison, Yue He takes advantage of the chaos to free the Xie brothers. After the raid is over, the Zous join the Xie brothers in taking revenge by slaughtering those responsible for their plight. Following that, the group decides to head to Liangshan Marsh to join the outlaw band there.

== Battle against the Zhu Family Village ==
Before formally joining the Liangshan outlaws, the group decides to prove themselves by helping the outlaws destroy the Zhu Family Village, a fortified village run by the three Zhu brothers and their father, who have been very hostile towards the Liangshan outlaws. Previously, the outlaws have launched two assaults on the village but failed to overcome the defences.

Sun Li, who was trained by the same martial arts master as Luan Tingyu, the village's resident martial arts instructor, volunteers to make use of his acquaintance with Luan to infiltrate the village and carry out an espionage mission for Liangshan. The Xie brothers, along with Gu Dasao, Sun Xin, Yue He, and the Zous, accompany Sun Li on the mission. The Zhus and Luan Tingyu are initially suspicious when Sun Li and his group show up and claim to have come to help them fight the Liangshan outlaws. However, they trust the newcomers after Sun Li apparently defeats and captures Liangshan's Shi Xiu in a duel on horseback.

Sun Li and his group ultimately complete their mission successfully, allowing the outlaws to overrun the village on their third assault. After that, the group formally becomes part of the Liangshan outlaw band.

== Campaigns and death ==
Zou Run is appointed as a commander of the Liangshan infantry after the 108 Heroes are fully assembled. He participates in the campaigns against the Liao invaders and rebel forces in Song territory after the outlaws receive amnesty from Emperor Huizong.

Zou Run is one of the few Liangshan heroes who survive all the campaigns. Although the emperor awards him the honorary title "Martial Gentleman of Grace" (武奕郎) and offers him an official appointment to honour him for his contributions, he declines the offer and chooses to return to Laizhou to live as a commoner for the rest of his life.
