= Shi Yong =

Fictional character in the Chinese classical novel Water Margin

- Water Margin character
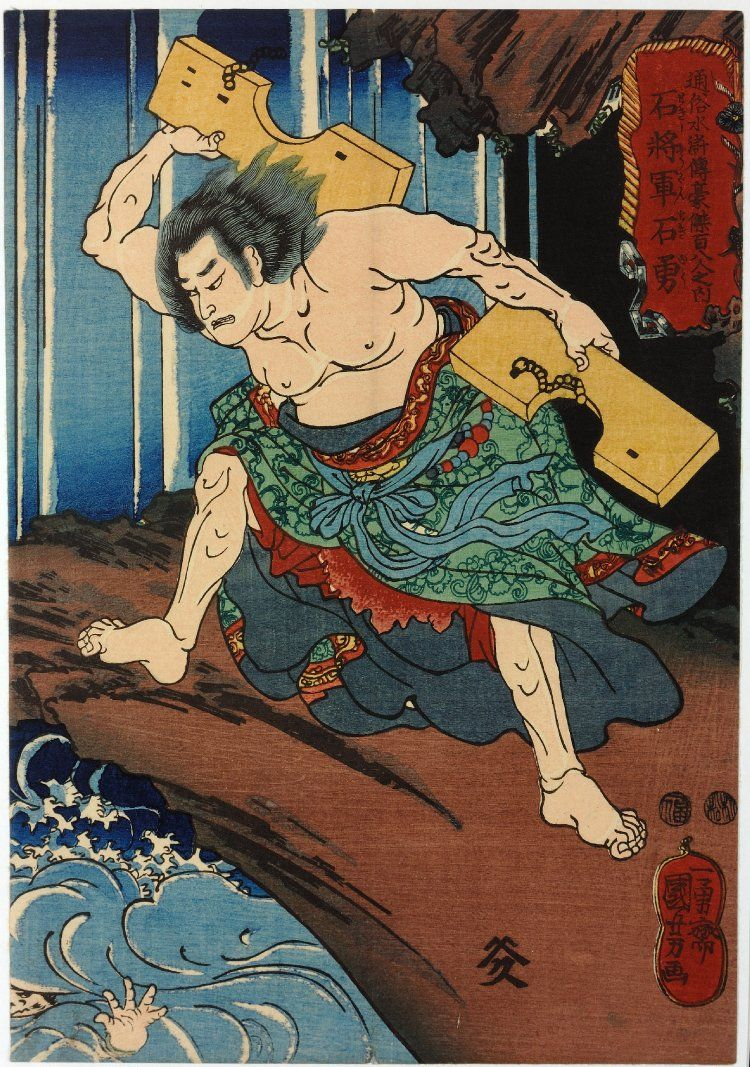
- an illustration of Shi Yong by Utagawa Kuniyoshi
- First appearance: Chapter 35

In-universe information
- Nickname: "Stone General" 石將軍
- Origin: gambler
- Designation: Infantry Commander of Liangshan
- Rank: 99th, Ugly Star (地丑星) of the 72 Earthly Fiends
- Ancestral home / Place of origin: Daming Prefecture (present-day Daming County, Hebei)

Chinese names
- Simplified Chinese: 石勇
- Traditional Chinese: 石勇
- Pinyin: Shí Yǒng
- Wade–Giles: Shih Yung

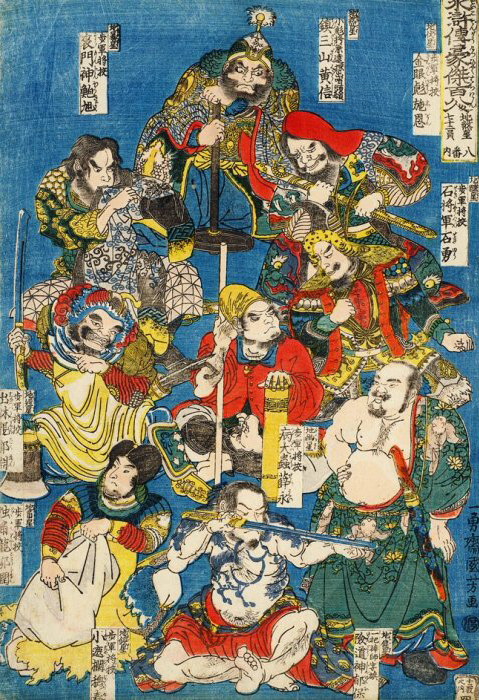
An illustration of nine of the 108 Heroes by Utagawa Kuniyoshi. Xue Yong is in the centre. The rest are (clockwise from top): Huang Xin, Shi En, Shi Yong, Yu Baosi, Mu Chun, Zou Run, Zou Yuan, and Bao Xu.

Shi Yong is a fictional character in Water Margin, one of the Classic Chinese Novels. Nicknamed "Stone General", he ranks 99th among the 108 Heroes and 63rd among the 72 Earthly Fiends.

== Background ==
The novel describes Shi Yong, who is nicknamed "Stone General", as an eight chi-tall man with a pale yellow complexion, sharp eyes, and a clean shaven face. A hardcore gambler originally from Daming Prefecture (大名府; present-day Daming County, Hebei), he flees home after killing a man in a fit of anger over gambling, and takes shelter in the residence of the nobleman Chai Jin.

== Becoming an outlaw ==
Shi Yong later travels to Yuncheng County to find Song Jiang, a magistrate's clerk famous for his chivalry and generosity. However, when he arrives as the Song residence, he learns that Song Jiang has gone on the run after killing his mistress Yan Poxi when she threatened to report him to the authorities for his secret connection to the outlaws at Liangshan Marsh.

During his time at the Song residence, Shi Yong is entertained by Song Jiang's younger brother, Song Qing. Later, when he receives news that Song Jiang is in Qingzhou, he makes his way there. Before Shi Yong leaves, Song Qing entrusts him with a letter to be delivered to Song Jiang.

Meanwhile, Song Jiang is leading some friends he has made in Qingzhou to join the outlaw band at Liangshan Marsh. En route, they stop at a restaurant for a meal and coincidentally encounter Shi Yong, who is occupying the largest table alone. Not recognising Song Jiang and the others, Shi Yong refuses to give up the table to anyone – not even the emperor – except Chai Jin and Song Jiang, whom he admires.

After Song Jiang introduces himself and his companions, Shi Yong is surprised and delighted to learn that he has finally found the man he has heard so much about. He then passes Song Qing's letter to Song Jiang. While Song Jiang leaves the group to return to Yuncheng County, Shi Yong and the others make their way to Liangshan and join the outlaw band.

== Campaigns and death ==
Shi Yong is appointed as a commander of the Liangshan infantry after the 108 Heroes are fully assembled. He participates in the campaigns against the Liao invaders and rebel forces in Song territory after the outlaws receive amnesty from Emperor Huizong.

During the final campaign against Fang La's rebel forces, Shi Yong and Li Yun are assigned to attack Shezhou (present-day She County, Anhui). They encounter Wang Yin, one of Fang La's top lieutenants, and end up being slain by him.
