= Shi En =

Fictional character in the Chinese classical novel Water Margin

- Water Margin character
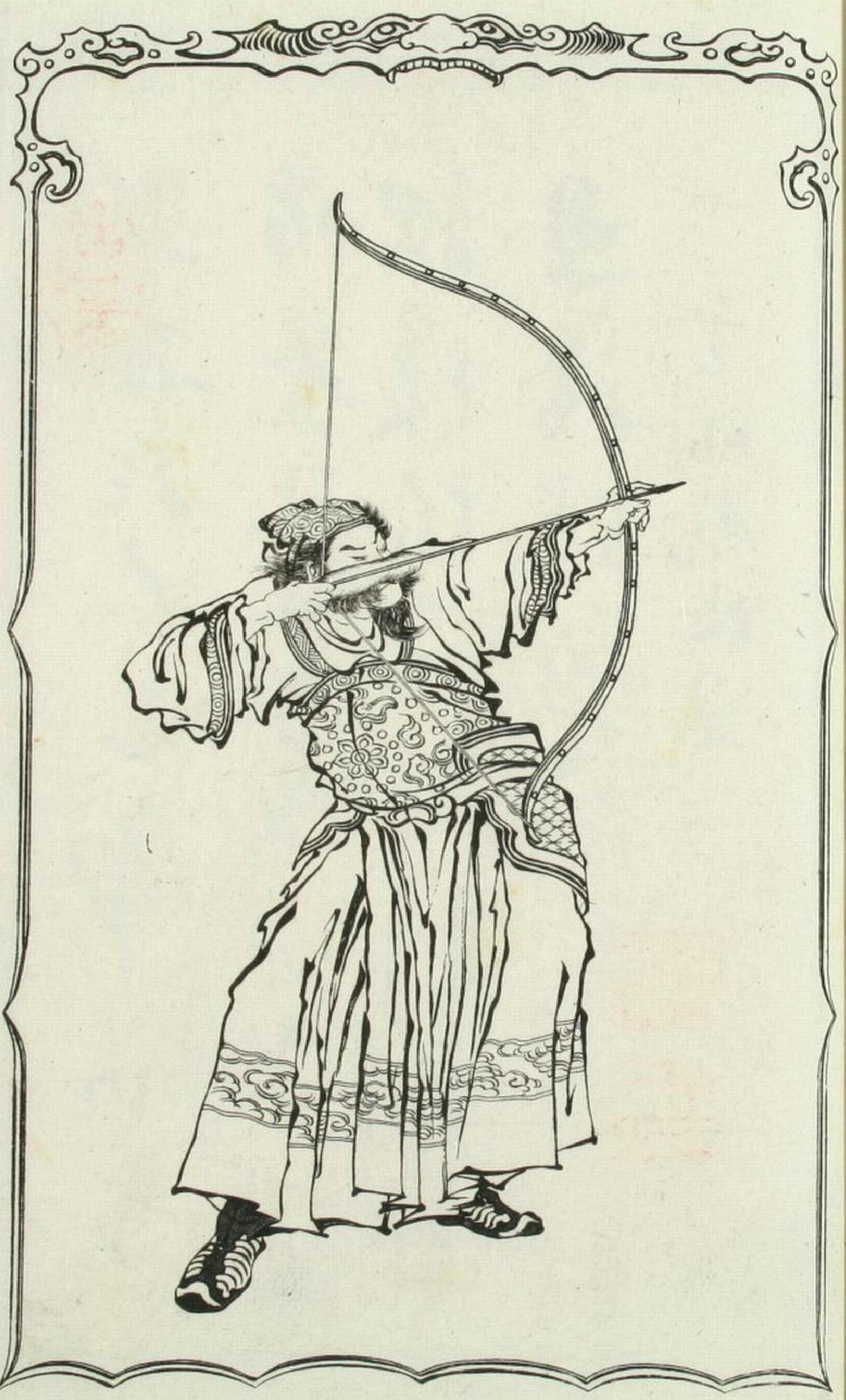
- a 19th-century illustration of Shi En
- First appearance: Chapter 28

In-universe information
- Nicknames: "Golden Eyed Tiger Cub" 金眼彪
- Origin: prison warden
- Designation: Infantry Commander of Liangshan
- Rank: 85th, Concealment Star (地伏星) of the 72 Earthly Fiends
- Ancestral home / Place of origin: Mengzhou, Henan

Chinese names
- Simplified Chinese: 施恩
- Traditional Chinese: 施恩
- Pinyin: Shī Ēn
- Wade–Giles: Shih En

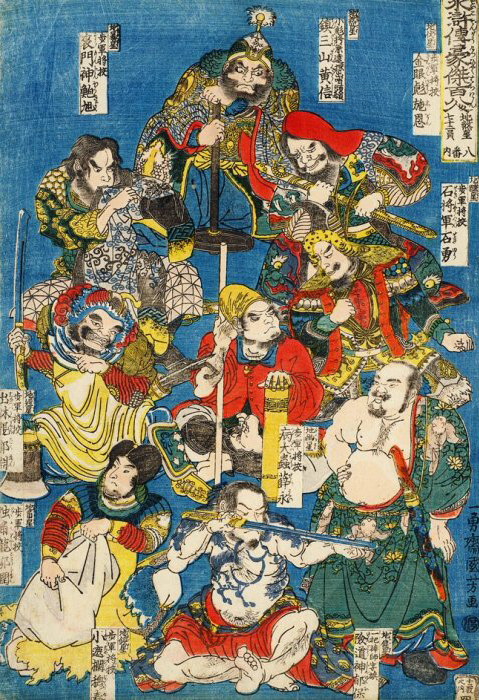
An illustration of nine of the 108 Heroes by Utagawa Kuniyoshi. Xue Yong is in the centre. The rest are (clockwise from top): Huang Xin, Shi En, Shi Yong, Yu Baosi, Mu Chun, Zou Run, Zou Yuan, and Bao Xu.

Shi En is a fictional character in Water Margin, one of the Classic Chinese Novels. Nicknamed "Golden Eyed Tiger Cub", he ranks 85th among the 108 Heroes and 49th among the 72 Earthly Fiends.

== Background ==
The novel describes Shi En as a six chi-tall fair-complexioned and handsome man with a moustache and goatee. His father is the warden of a prison camp in Mengzhou.

== Meeting Wu Song ==
Shi En is first introduced in the novel when he meets Wu Song, who has been sentenced to exile in the prison camp in Mengzhou after killing Pan Jinlian and Ximen Qing to avenge his brother Wu Dalang.

Shi En's father, who is the prison warden, informs Wu Song that all inmates are subject to a mandatory flogging called "100 strokes of shaweibang" (殺威棒; "ego-killing staff") upon arrival. Just as Wu Song is about to be beaten, Shi En speaks up and says that Wu Song looks pallid and might be ill, so his father postpones the flogging.

Over the next few days, Shi En ensures that Wu Song is treated well in prison: from getting a clean cell all to himself to being served good food and drinks every meal. A surprised Wu Song then asks to meet Shi En, who reveals that he actually needs Wu Song's help in dealing with a hooligan called Jiang Zhong, nicknamed "Jiang the Door God". Shi En previously owned a restaurant called Happy Forest (快活林), which has been seized from him by Jiang Zhong.

Agreeing to help Shi En to repay his kindness, Wu Song goes to confront Jiang Zhong at Happy Forest. Along the way, he drinks three bowls of alcoholic drinks at every place which serves alcohol he comes across, and has already consumed an enormous amount of alcohol by the time he reaches Happy Forest. He provokes Jiang Zhong into a fight and soundly beats him. Jiang Zhong is forced to apologise to Shi En, give up Happy Forest, and leave Mengzhou for good.

A humiliated Jiang Zhong secretly conspires with two corrupt officials in Mengzhou – Instructor Zhang and Inspector Zhang – to take revenge. Inspector Zhang pretends to be impressed with Wu Song's physical prowess and asks the prison warden to let Wu Song stay in his residence. Without Wu Song to protect him, Shi En is beaten up by Jiang Zhong, who seizes Happy Forest from him again.

During his stay in Inspector Zhang's residence, Wu Song is framed for larceny and gets thrown back into prison. Shi En, who is still recovering from his injuries, pulls strings to help Wu Song by bribing the judge presiding over the case and the jailers watching over Wu Song. In the end, Wu Song is sentenced to exile in another prison camp. Shi En warns him of danger before he leaves Mengzhou.

Indeed, Jiang Zhong and the corrupt officials have bribed the guards escorting Wu Song to murder him along the way. However, Wu Song breaks free, slays the guards and assassins sent to kill him, and then returns to Mengzhou to take his revenge by killing Jiang Zhong, the corrupt officials, and their families.

== Becoming an outlaw ==
After Wu Song becomes an outlaw and takes shelter in the outlaw stronghold at Mount Twin Dragons (二龍山), Shi En also leaves Mengzhou and goes to join Wu Song and the outlaws.

The outlaws from Mount Twin Dragons eventually join the larger outlaw band at Liangshan Marsh after the battle of Qingzhou (in present-day Shandong) between the Liangshan outlaws and government forces.

== Campaigns and death ==
Shi En is appointed as a commander of the Liangshan infantry after the 108 Heroes are fully assembled. He participates in the campaigns against the Liao invaders and rebel forces in Song territory after the outlaws receive amnesty from Emperor Huizong.

During the final campaign against Fang La's rebel forces, Shi En joins Liangshan marines in staging a naval assault on Kunshan. A non-swimmer, he eventually drowns after his boat sinks.
