= Yu Baosi =

Fictional character in the Chinese classical novel Water Margin

- Water Margin character
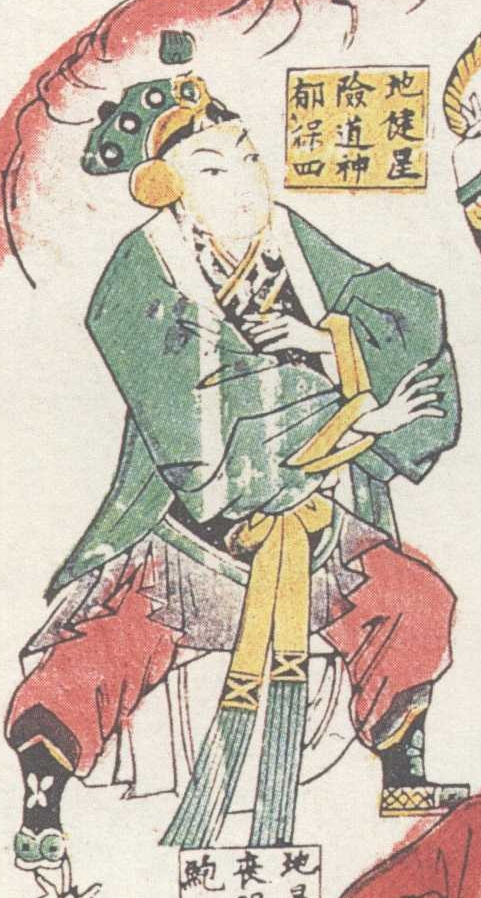
- a Qing dynasty illustration of Yu Baosi
- First appearance: Chapter 68

In-universe information
- Nickname: "God of the Dangerous Road" 險道神
- Origin: outlaw
- Designation: Chief Flag-bearer of Liangshan
- Rank: 105th, Healthy Star (地健星) of the 72 Earthly Fiends
- Ancestral home / Place of origin: Qingzhou (in present-day Shandong)

Chinese names
- Simplified Chinese: 郁保四
- Traditional Chinese: 郁保四
- Pinyin: Yù Bǎosì
- Wade–Giles: Yü Pao-szu

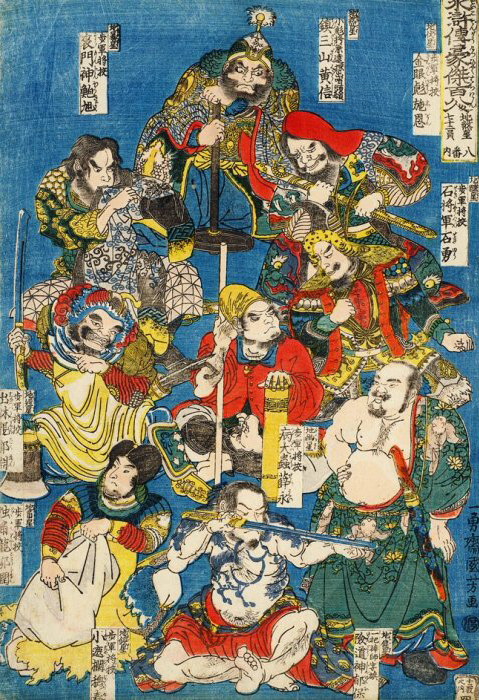
An illustration of nine of the 108 Heroes by Utagawa Kuniyoshi. Xue Yong is in the centre. The rest are (clockwise from top): Huang Xin, Shi En, Shi Yong, Yu Baosi, Mu Chun, Zou Run, Zou Yuan, and Bao Xu.

Yu Baosi is a fictional character in Water Margin, one of the Classic Chinese Novels. Nicknamed "God of the Dangerous Road", he ranks 105th among the 108 Heroes and 69th among the 72 Earthly Fiends.

== Background ==
Nicknamed "God of the Dangerous Road", Yu Baosi is described in the novel as a man about one zhang (ten chi) tall with a thick girth. Wielding a long broad-bladed sabre in battle, he leads an outlaw band of about 200 men to rob travellers in Qingzhou (in present-day Shandong).

== Joining the Zeng Family Fortress ==
Yu Baosi is first introduced in the novel when the outlaws from Liangshan Marsh are at war with the Zeng Family Fortress, a fortified village led by the five Zeng brothers and their father who are hostile towards Liangshan. The conflict has deepened after Shi Wengong, the fortress's resident martial arts instructor, fired a poisoned arrow that killed Liangshan's chief, Chao Gai.

The outlaws, under their acting chief Song Jiang, harden their resolve to destroy the Zengs and avenge Chao Gai. This comes after Yu Baosi seizes over 200 horses the outlaws have purchased, and present them to the Zengs as his ticket to join the fortress.

== Surrendering to Liangshan ==
After the Liangshan outlaws kill two of the Zeng brothers in battle, the Zeng family's patriarch Zeng Nong decides to make peace with the outlaws. Song Jiang pretends to agree and they set the terms as the Zengs having to return the stolen horses and hand over Yu Baosi to Liangshan in exchange for five outlaws as hostages.

After the exchange, the outlaws convince Yu Baosi to defect to Liangshan and serve as their spy in the Zeng Family Fortress. In return, the outlaws will forgive him for stealing their horses. Yu Baosi agrees and makes his way back to the fortress, lying to the Zengs that he has escaped from the Liangshan camp and learnt that the outlaws are in trouble as government forces are on the way to help the Zengs.

The Zengs fall for the ruse, stage a raid on the Liangshan camp, and end up falling into an ambush. Meanwhile, Yu Baosi works with the hostages in the fortress to cause chaos and allow the attacking Liangshan forces to enter. The battle ends with a complete victory for the outlaws, who also capture Shi Wengong and execute him to avenge Chao Gai.

== Life at Liangshan ==
Yu Baosi appears again when the Liangshan outlaws are attacking Dongping Prefecture (東平府; present-day Dongping County, Shandong). Song Jiang, who is leading the outlaws, sends Yu Baosi and Wang Dingliu as his messengers to meet the prefectural governor and demand his surrender.

Initially, the governor feels intimidated by the outlaws and considers surrendering. However, the military officer Dong Ping steps in, reassuring the governor that he will hold off the outlaws. Dong Ping also urges the governor to execute Yu Baosi and Wang Dingliu to demonstrate his resolve, even though Yu Baosi is an old acquaintance of his. Yet, the governor has the two men flogged and thrown out of the city.

The Liangshan outlaws ultimately defeat Dong Ping, win him over to their side, and capture the prefecture.

== Campaigns and death ==
Yu Baosi is appointed as the chief flag-bearer of Liangshan because of his striking height after the 108 Heroes are fully assembled.

After the outlaws receive amnesty from Emperor Huizong, Yu Baosi participates in the campaigns against the Liao invaders and rebel forces in Song territory.

During the final campaign against Fang La's rebel forces, Yu Baosi is assigned to attack Qingxi County (清溪縣; present-day Chun'an County, Zhejiang). He is killed by the enemy warrior Du Wei, who specialises in throwing daggers. After the campaign, the emperor honours Yu Baosi for his contributions by awarding him the posthumous title "Righteous Gentleman of Integrity" (義節郎).
