= Bao Xu =

Fictional character in the Chinese classical novel Water Margin

- Water Margin character
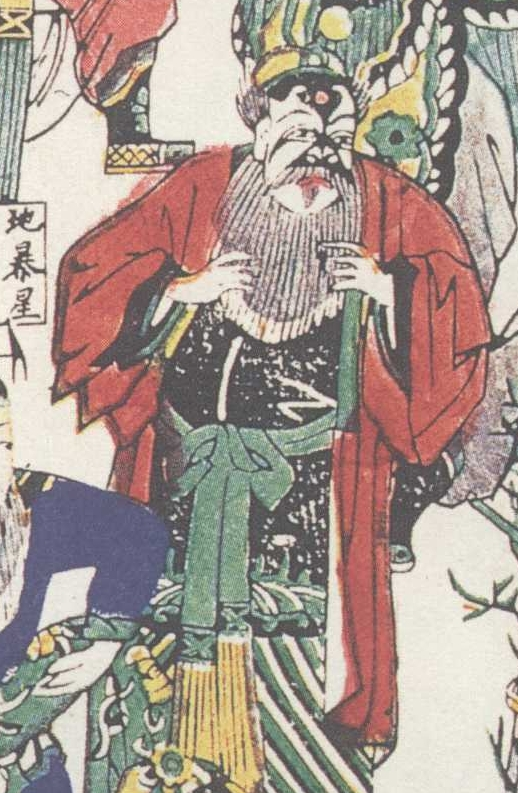
- a Qing dynasty illustration of Bao Xu
- First appearance: Chapter 67

In-universe information
- Nickname: "God of Death" 喪門神
- Weapon: broad-bladed sword (闊刃劍)
- Origin: outlaw
- Designation: Infantry Commander of Liangshan
- Rank: 60th, Savage Star (地暴星) of the 72 Earthly Fiends
- Ancestral home / Place of origin: Kouzhou (present-day Guan County, Shandong)

Chinese names
- Simplified Chinese: 鲍旭
- Traditional Chinese: 鮑旭
- Pinyin: Bào Xù
- Wade–Giles: Pao Hsü

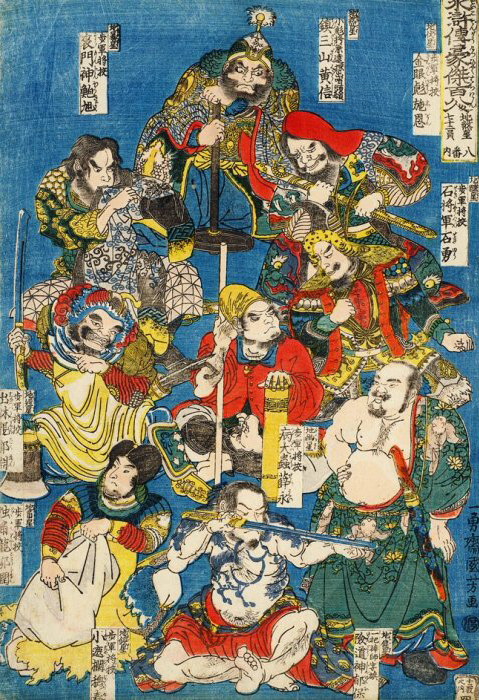
An illustration of nine of the 108 Heroes by Utagawa Kuniyoshi. Xue Yong is in the centre. The rest are (clockwise from top): Huang Xin, Shi En, Shi Yong, Yu Baosi, Mu Chun, Zou Run, Zou Yuan, and Bao Xu.

Bao Xu is a fictional character in Water Margin, one of the Classic Chinese Novels. Nicknamed "God of Death", he ranks 60th among the 108 Heroes and 24th among the 72 Earthly Fiends.

== Background ==
The novel describes Bao Xu as an ugly-looking man with a face like the bottom of a wok, fierce bulging eyes and lips like those of a wolf, and a thunderous and terrifying voice. Nicknamed "God of Death" for his plundering and murderous ways, he is a highly-skilled fighter who uses a broad-bladed sword in combat. He leads a small band of outlaws at Deadwood Hill (枯樹山) in Kouzhou (寇州; present-day Guan County, Shandong).

== Joining Liangshan ==
Bao Xu first appears in the novel when Li Kui, an outlaw from Liangshan Marsh, comes to Deadwood Hill to find him. Earlier, Li Kui has encountered and befriended the wrestler Jiao Ting, who is on his way to join the Deadwood Hill outlaws, and heard about Bao Xu from him.

Upon reaching Deadwood Hill, Li Kui and Jiao Ting introduce themselves to Bao Xu, who accepts Li Kui's invitation to join Liangshan. Just then, the trio learn that Liangshan's Xuan Zan and Hao Siwen have been captured by government forces, and that the convoy escorting the two captives is passing by Deadwood Hill. Together, they attack the convoy and save Xuan Zan and Hao Siwen.

Afterwards, Bao Xu leads his followers to join Li Kui and Jiao Ting in launching a surprise attack on the government forces' base at Lingzhou (凌州; in present-day Dezhou, Shandong). Following the outlaws' victory, Bao Xu and his men follow Li Kui and the others back to Liangshan, and become part of the Liangshan outlaw band.

== Campaigns and death ==
Bao Xu is appointed as a commander of the Liangshan infantry after the 108 Heroes are fully assembled. He participates in the campaigns against the Liao invaders and rebel forces in Song territory after the outlaws receive amnesty from Emperor Huizong.

During the final campaign against Fang La's rebel forces, Bao Xu and Li Kui are assigned to attack the north gate at the battle of Hangzhou. Bao Xu, after slaying the enemy warrior Lian Ming, is eager to gain the top credit for victory so he charges into the city once the gate is open. However, he ends up falling into an ambush and getting sliced in two by the enemy commander Shi Bao.
