= Huang Xin =

Fictional character in the Chinese classical novel Water Margin

- Water Margin character
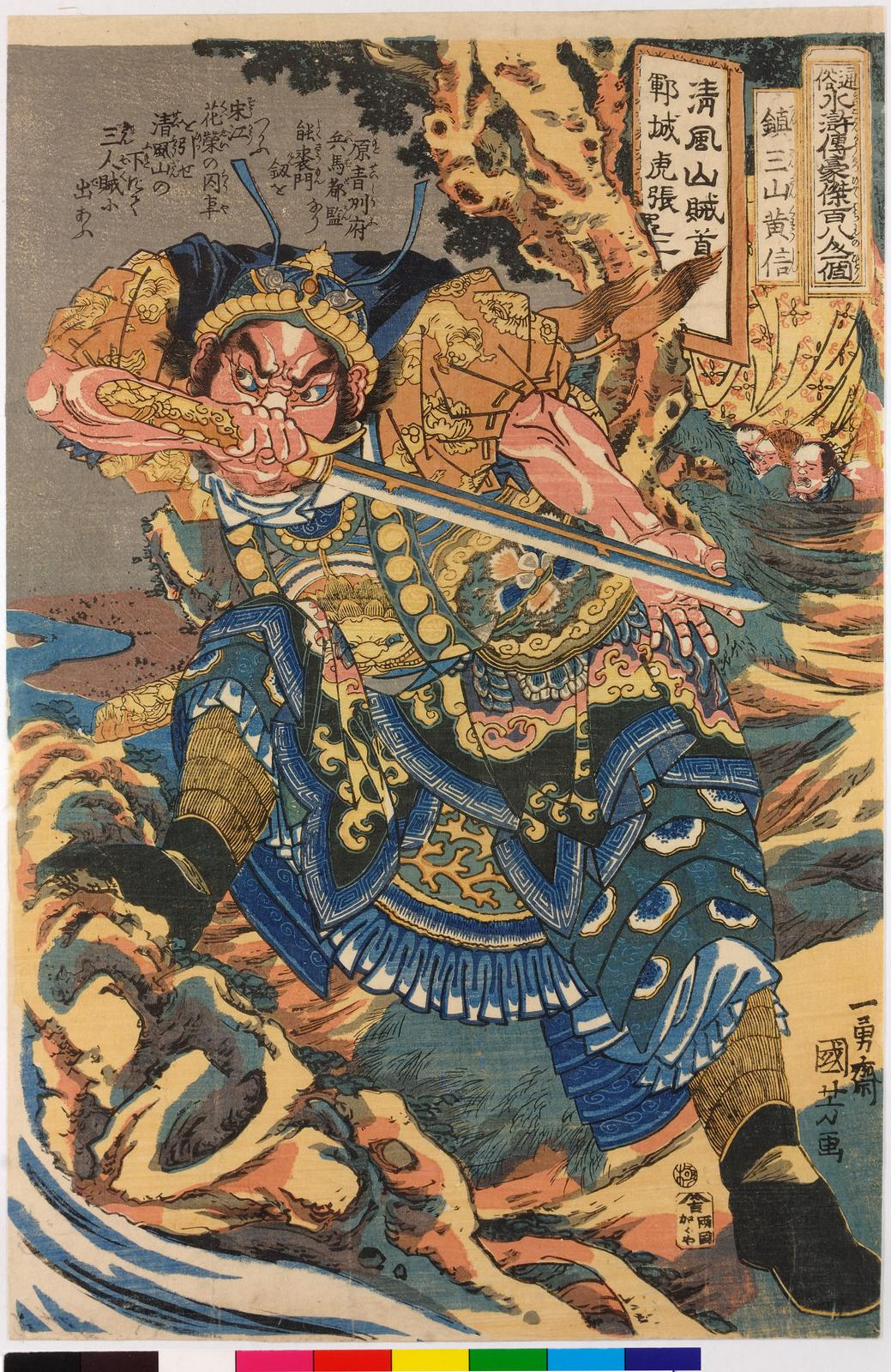
- an illustration of Huang Xin by Utagawa Kuniyoshi
- First appearance: Chapter 33

In-universe information
- Nickname: "Guardian of the Three Mountains" 鎮三山
- Weapon: Sword of Death (喪門劍)
- Origin: military officer
- Designation: Tiger Cub Patrol Commander of Liangshan
- Rank: 38th, Malignant Star (地煞星) of the 72 Earthly Fiends
- Ancestral home / Place of origin: Qingzhou (in present-day Shandong)

Chinese names
- Simplified Chinese: 黄信
- Traditional Chinese: 黃信
- Pinyin: Huáng Xìn
- Wade–Giles: Huang Hsin

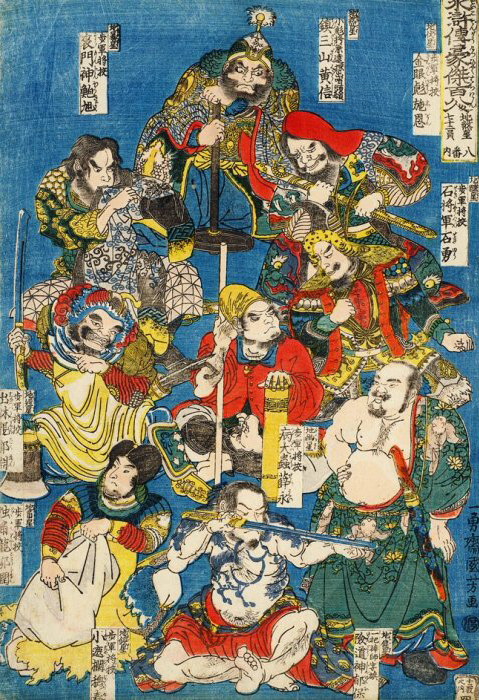
An illustration of nine of the 108 Heroes by Utagawa Kuniyoshi. Xue Yong is in the centre. The rest are (clockwise from top): Huang Xin, Shi En, Shi Yong, Yu Baosi, Mu Chun, Zou Run, Zou Yuan, and Bao Xu.

Huang Xin is a fictional character in Water Margin, one of the Classic Chinese Novels. Nicknamed "Guardian of the Three Mountains", he ranks 38th among the 108 Heroes and second among the 72 Earthly Fiends.

== Background ==
Huang Xin is first introduced in the novel as a military officer from Qingzhou (青州; in present-day Shandong) serving under the governor, Murong Yanda. A skilled fighter trained by Qin Ming (who also serves as a military officer in Qingzhou), he fights well on both foot and horseback, wielding a sword called "Sword of Death" (喪門劍). He earns himself the nickname "Guardian of the Three Mountains" after he once boasted that he can defeat the outlaw groups based on three mountains around Qingzhou: Mount Qingfeng (清風山), Mount Twin Dragons (二龍山), and Mount Peach Blossom (桃花山).

== Becoming an outlaw ==
Huang Xin is sent to Qingfeng Fort (清風寨; in present-day Qingzhou, Shandong), which is under Qingzhou's jurisdiction, to deal with Hua Rong, a renegade military officer who has defied his superior Liu Gao, the fort commandant, and provided shelter to the fugitive Song Jiang. He pretends to mediate the conflict between Hua Rong and Liu Gao, luring Hua into an ambush and capturing him, while Liu Gao's men arrest Song Jiang in the meantime. Song Jiang and Hua Rong are then secured in prison carts to be escorted to Qingzhou by Huang Xin and his men, with Liu Gao accompanying them.

En route to Qingzhou, the convoy is ambushed by the outlaws from Mount Qingfeng whom Song Jiang has befriended earlier. Outnumbered, Huang Xin is forced to retreat and hold up in the fort, while Liu Gao is killed by the outlaws. Huang Xin then reports the situation to Qingzhou's governor Murong Yanda, who sends reinforcements led by Huang Xin's master, Qin Ming, to deal with the outlaws.

However, Qin Ming ends up as the outlaws' captive and reluctantly joins them after they trick Murong Yanda into believing that he has betrayed and turned against the governor. Qin Ming then heads to Qingfeng Fort to meet Huang Xin, and manages to convince his apprentice to surrender and join the outlaws as well. Huang Xin then accompanies Qin Ming, Song Jiang and the others as they make their way to Liangshan Marsh to join the larger outlaw band there.

== Campaigns ==
Huang Xin is appointed as a Tiger Cub Patrol Commander of the Liangshan cavalry after the 108 Heroes are fully assembled. He participates in the campaigns against the Liao invaders and rebel forces in Song territory after the outlaws receive amnesty from Emperor Huizong.

The final campaign against Fang La's rebel forces costs the lives of nearly two-thirds of the 108 Heroes; Huang Xin is one of the few lucky survivors. To honour Huang Xin for his contributions during the campaigns, the emperor awards him the title "Martial Gentleman of Grace" (武奕郎) and reinstates him as a military officer.
