= Nanjusi =

Nanjusi 南菊寺村
- Village
- Location in Shandong
- Coordinates: 37°13′31″N 120°03′26″E
- Country: People's Republic of China
- Province: Shandong
- Prefecture-level city: Yantai
- County-level city: Laizhou
- Town: Chengguo

Nanjusi (Chinese: 南菊寺村; pinyin: Nánjúsì Cūn) is a village in the town of Chengguo (程郭镇), Laizhou, Shandong, China. It has 225 households, with a population of 670. The cultivated area there is 965 Chinese acres.

== History ==
Tang founded the village. The key communication line was with the inn, and thus the village was named Tang Jiadian. Because Tang was not prosperous, the superstitious view was that the Liang Jia grave north of the village suppressed the geomancy, meaning the village's name was unacceptable. The village named was thereafter changed because of the nearby Chrysanthemum Temple. This village's surname is Lu Qin, which means basic situation.

== Description ==
The village is located 5 km northeast of the regulation Guo town government. The grain field area comprises 450 Chinese acres. The staple crops are wheat and corn. In addition, the villagers engage in fish breeding and the raising of poultry and pigs. The large Laichau Sheng Plexiglas Limited Company invests in the village, and has set up a factory for the manufacture of Plexiglas.
