= Mu Chun =

Fictional character in the Chinese classical novel Water Margin

- Water Margin character
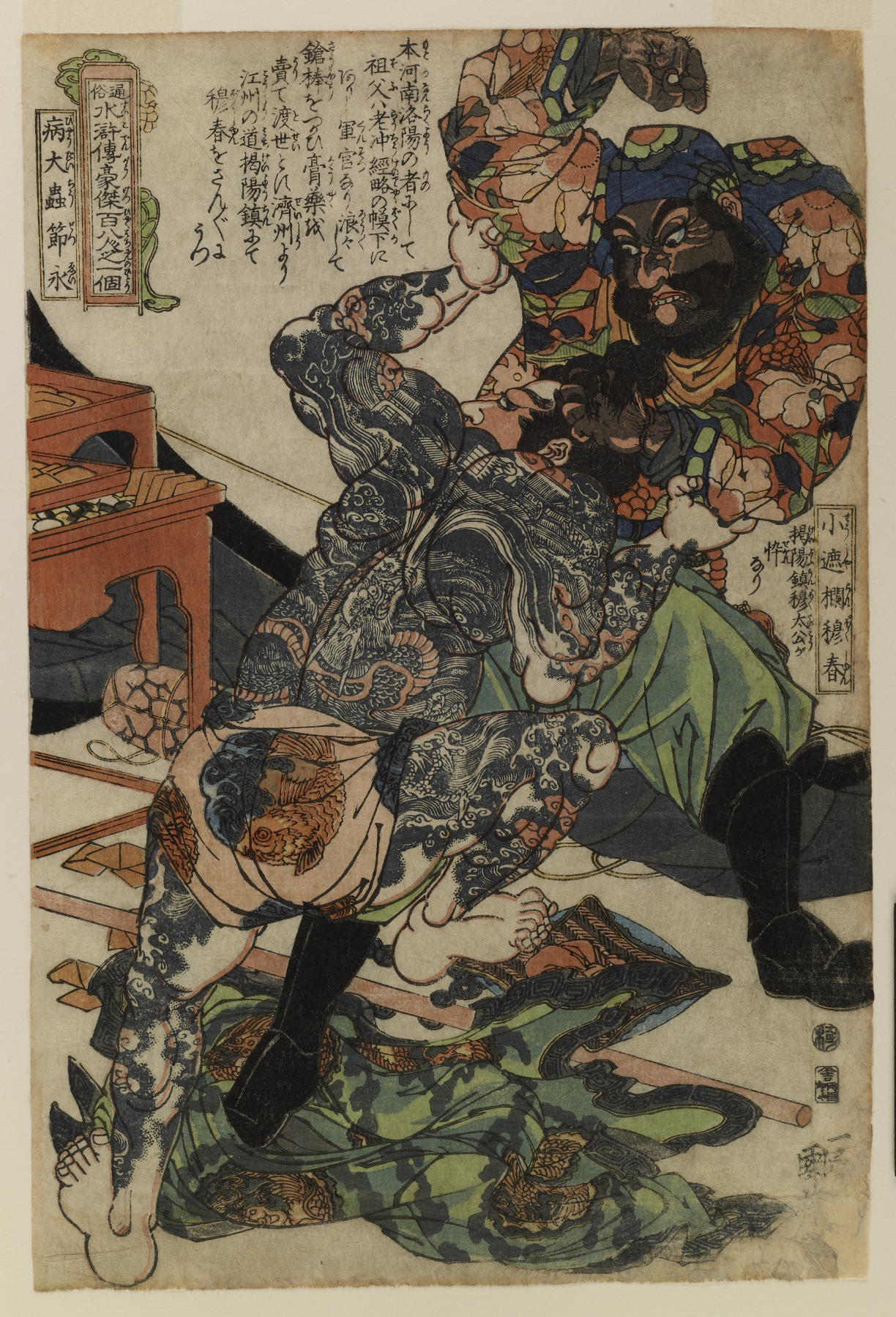
- a 19th-century Japanese illustration of Mu Chun (bottom) fighting Xue Yong
- First appearance: Chapter 36

In-universe information
- Nickname: "Little Unrestrained" 小遮攔
- Weapon: sabre
- Origin: scion
- Designation: Infantry Commander of Liangshan
- Rank: 80th, Guardian Star (地鎮星) of the 72 Earthly Fiends
- Ancestral home / Place of origin: Jieyang Town (believed to be in present-day Jiujiang, Jiangxi)

Chinese names
- Simplified Chinese: 穆春
- Traditional Chinese: 穆春
- Pinyin: Mù Chūn
- Wade–Giles: Mu Ch'un

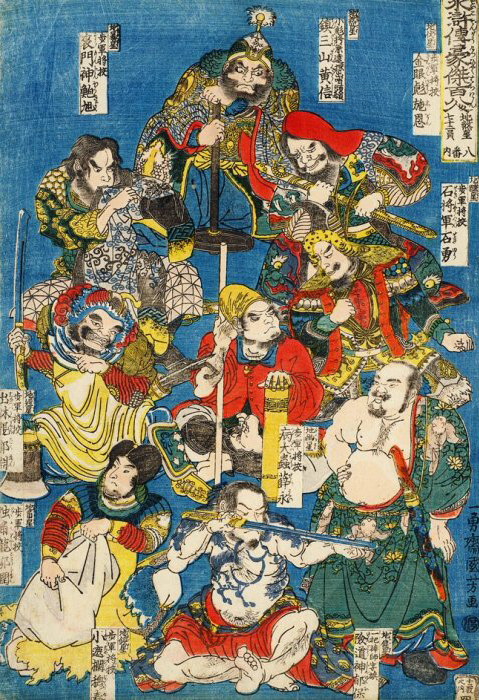
An illustration of nine of the 108 Heroes by Utagawa Kuniyoshi. Xue Yong is in the centre. The rest are (clockwise from top): Huang Xin, Shi En, Shi Yong, Yu Baosi, Mu Chun, Zou Run, Zou Yuan, and Bao Xu.

Mu Chun is a fictional character in Water Margin, one of the Classic Chinese Novels. Nicknamed "Little Unrestrained", he ranks 80th among the 108 Heroes and 44th among the 72 Earthly Fiends.

== Background ==
Mu Chun and his elder brother, "Unrestrained" Mu Hong, come from a wealthy family in Jieyang Town (揭陽鎮; believed to be in present-day Jiujiang, Jiangxi), where they are both respected and feared by the local townsfolk.

== Meeting Song Jiang ==
When Song Jiang is being escorted into exile to Jiangzhou (江州; present-day Jiujiang, Jiangxi), he passes by Jieyang Town and meets Xue Yong, who is earning a living by entertaining passers-by on the streets with his physical feats and martial arts. As he has not paid respect to the Mu brothers before staging his show, the Mu brothers feel offended and have warned the townsfolk not to pay him anything. Song Jiang, who is sympathetic towards Xue Yong, tips him generously. Mu Chun, who is watching in the crowd, thinks that Song Jiang is trying to challenge his "authority" in the town so he violently confronts the latter. However, Xue Yong comes to Song Jiang's aid and easily beats Mu Chun.

Humiliated, Mu Chun orders the local inns not to provide accommodation to Song Jiang and his escorts for the night. They have no choice but to take shelter in the Mu residence, where the Mu brothers' father kindly offers them free lodging without letting the brothers know. Meanwhile, the Mu brothers track down Xue Yong, capture him, and give him a good beating before returning home. Song Jiang overhears their conversation about planning to take revenge against him, so he and the two escorts flee the Mu residence under the cover of night.

When the Mu brothers realise Song Jiang has gotten away, they pursue him to the riverbank, where Song boards the pirate Zhang Heng's boat in desperation. In the middle of the river, Zhang Heng reveals himself and wants to rob and kill Song Jiang, but his friend Li Jun, whom Song has met earlier, shows up and stops him. Li Jun then introduces Song Jiang to Zhang Heng, and later to the Mu brothers, who are all shocked to learn that the man they tried to harm is a famous chivalrous man they have long heard of and admire. The Mu brothers apologise to Song Jiang, release Xue Yong, and treat them as honoured guests at their residence before seeing him on his journey to Jiangzhou.

== Becoming an outlaw ==
When Song Jiang is arrested and sentenced to death for composing a seditious poem in Jiangzhou, the outlaws from Liangshan Marsh show up and storm the execution ground to save him. The whole lot flees Jiangzhou and reaches the riverbank, where they are stranded at a temple while government forces close in. After they fend off the government forces, the Mu brothers and others whom Song Jiang has met and befriended earlier suddenly show up in their boats and ferry everyone to safety. After that, the Mu brothers and the others join the outlaw band at Liangshan.

== Campaigns and later life ==
Mu Chun is appointed as a commander of the Liangshan infantry after the 108 Heroes are fully assembled. He participates in the campaigns against the Liao invaders and rebel forces in Song territory after the outlaws receive amnesty from Emperor Huizong.

During the final campaign against Fang La's rebel forces, six of the Liangshan heroes fall sick after the battle of Hangzhou so Mu Chun remains behind to take care of them. During this time, Mu Chun's elder brother Mu Hong dies of illness.

After the campaign is over, the emperor honours Mu Chun for his contributions by awarding him the title "Martial Gentleman of Grace" (武奕郎) and offers him to appoint him as an official. However, Mu Chun declines and returns to Jieyang Town to lead a peaceful life.
