= Xue Yong =

Fictional character in the Chinese classical novel Water Margin

- Water Margin character
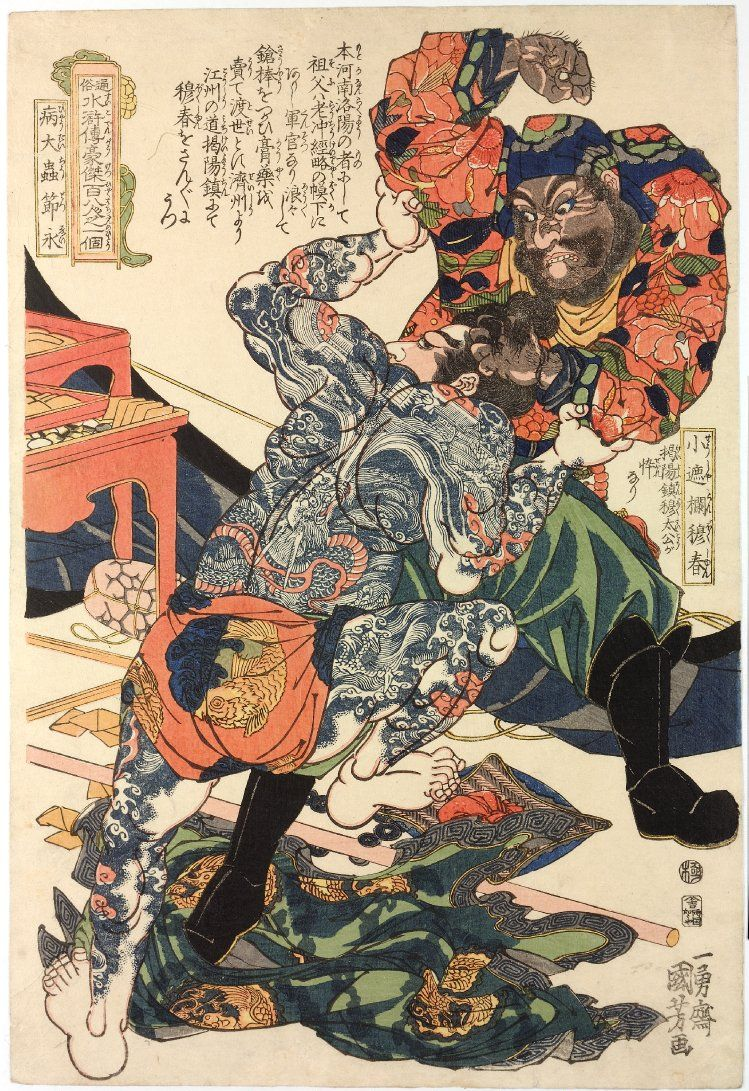
- a 19th-century Japanese illustration of Xue Yong (top) fighting Mu Chun
- First appearance: Chapter 36

In-universe information
- Nickname: "Sick (Note: 病, which means "sick", is a homonym of 並, which means "to be comparable or equivalent to". Xue Yong's nickname can thus be understood to mean "Equivalent/Comparable to a Tiger" to reflect his fighting prowess.) Tiger (Note: 大蟲, which literally means "big bug", is used as a euphemism or literary term in place of 虎, the proper Chinese term for tiger. See the Wiktionary entry for 大蟲.)" 病大蟲
- Origin: medicine peddler
- Designation: Infantry Commander of Liangshan
- Rank: 84th, Tranquil Star (地幽星) of the 72 Earthly Fiends
- Ancestral home / Place of origin: Luoyang, Henan

Chinese names
- Simplified Chinese: 薛永
- Traditional Chinese: 薛永
- Pinyin: Xuē Yǒng
- Wade–Giles: Hsüeh Yung

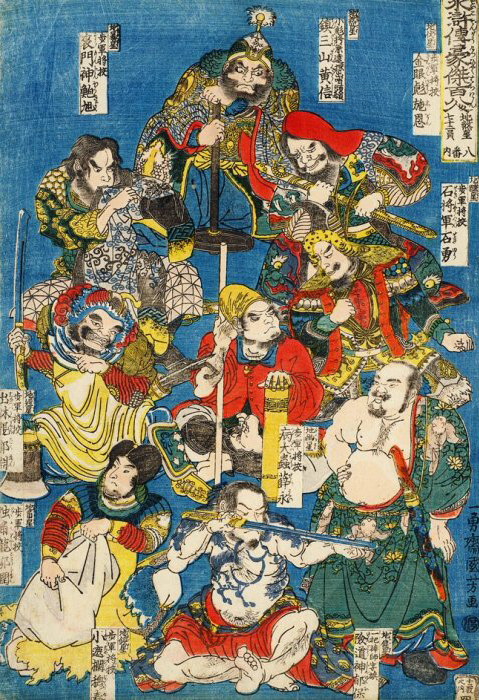
An illustration of nine of the 108 Heroes by Utagawa Kuniyoshi. Xue Yong is in the centre. The rest are (clockwise from top): Huang Xin, Shi En, Shi Yong, Yu Baosi, Mu Chun, Zou Run, Zou Yuan, and Bao Xu.

Xue Yong is a fictional character in Water Margin, one of the Classic Chinese Novels. Nicknamed "Sick Tiger", he ranks 84th among the 108 Heroes and 48th among the 72 Earthly Fiends.

== Background ==
Originally from Luoyang, Henan, Xue Yong is nicknamed "Sick Tiger" for his combat skills, specialising in the use of pole weapons such as staffs and spear/lances. His grandfather was a military officer who had lost his career after offending his colleagues, and his descendants had since grown up in poverty. Xue Yong makes a living by roaming from place to place, performing physical feats and martial arts on the streets to promote the medicine and health supplements he sells.

== Meeting Song Jiang ==
One day, Xue Yong arrives in Jieyang Town (揭陽鎮; believed to be in present-day Jiujiang, Jiangxi) and stages a performance to promote his products. As he has not paid respect to the brothers Mu Hong and Mu Chun, who are the most influential men in town, the brothers feel insulted and order the townsfolk not to pay Xue Yong after watching him perform.

At the time, Song Jiang, who is passing by Jieyang Town on his way to exile in Jiangzhou (江州; present-day Jiujiang, Jiangxi), chances upon Xue Yong's performance and is so impressed that he gives a generous tip. Mu Chun, who is watching in the crowd, thinks that Song Jiang is trying to challenge his "authority" in the town so he violently confronts the latter. However, Xue Yong comes to Song Jiang's aid and easily beats Mu Chun. After Song Jiang and Xue Yong introduce themselves to each other, the latter is awed to learn that the man he just met is someone well known throughout the jianghu for his chivalry and generosity. They part ways later.

Meanwhile, a humiliated Mu Chun orders the local inns not to provide accommodation to Song Jiang for the night. He also gets his brother and their goons to help him track down Xue Yong, capture him, and give him a good beating. Unknown to the Mu brothers, Song Jiang has been offered shelter in the Mu residence by the brothers' kind father. Later that night, Song Jiang overhears the Mu brothers' conversation about planning to take revenge against him, so he flees the Mu residence under the cover of night.

When the Mu brothers realise Song Jiang has gotten away, they pursue him to the riverbank, where Song boards the pirate Zhang Heng's boat in desperation. In the middle of the river, Zhang Heng reveals himself and wants to rob and kill Song Jiang, but his friend Li Jun, whom Song has met earlier, shows up and stops him. Li Jun then introduces Song Jiang to Zhang Heng, and later to the Mu brothers, who are all shocked to learn that the man they tried to harm is someone they have long heard of and admire. The Mu brothers apologise to Song Jiang, release Xue Yong, and treat them as honoured guests at their residence before seeing him on his journey to Jiangzhou.

== Becoming an outlaw ==
When Song Jiang is arrested and sentenced to death for composing a seditious poem in Jiangzhou, the outlaws from Liangshan Marsh show up and storm the execution ground to save him. The whole lot flees Jiangzhou and reaches the riverbank, where they are stranded at a temple while government forces close in. After they fend off the government forces, Xue Yong and the others whom Song Jiang has met and befriended earlier suddenly show up in their boats and ferry everyone safely across the river, and they take shelter in the Mu residence.

Before returning to Liangshan, Song Jiang hopes to take revenge against Huang Wenbing, the man responsible for his plight in Jiangzhou. Coincidentally, Hou Jian, a tailor working in Huang Wenbing's residence, is Xue Yong's martial arts apprentice. Xue Yong uses his relationship with Hou Jian to help the outlaws infiltrate the Huang residence and kill Huang Wenbing and his family. After that, Xue Yong and Hou Jian follow the outlaws back to their stronghold at Liangshan Marsh and join them.

== Campaigns and death ==
Xue Yong is appointed as a commander of the Liangshan infantry after the 108 Heroes are fully assembled. He participates in the campaigns against the Liao invaders and rebel forces in Song territory after the outlaws receive amnesty from Emperor Huizong.

During the final campaign against Fang La's rebel forces, Xue Yong and five other Liangshan heroes (Shi Jin, Shi Xiu, Chen Da, Yang Chun, and Li Zhong) are assigned to assault Yuling Pass (昱嶺關; near present-day Zhupu Village, She County, Anhui), which is guarded by Pang Wanchun. Pang Wanchun kills Shi Jin with a single arrow shot, while his archers rain arrows on Xue Yong and the other four, killing them all.
