= Wang Shaotang =

- Born: Wáng Shàotáng (王少堂); 1889; Yangzhou, Jiangsu, China
- Died: 1968

Wáng Shàotáng (王少堂; 1889–1968) is the stage name of the Chinese artist of Yangzhou storytelling, whose birth name is Wáng Dézhuāng (王德庄). As a master of Yangzhou storytelling, his most famous works are The 10 chapters of Wu Song (武十回), The 10 chapters of Song Jiang (宋十回), The 10 chapters of Lu Junyi (卢十回), and The 10 chapters of Shi Xiu (石十回).

Wang Shaotang began to study Yanzhou storytelling when he was only 7 years old. At the age of 12, he made his debut with The 10 chapters of Wu Song in Yangzhou. Since then, his career got under way.
