= Chai Jin =

Fictional character in the Chinese classical novel Water Margin

- Water Margin character
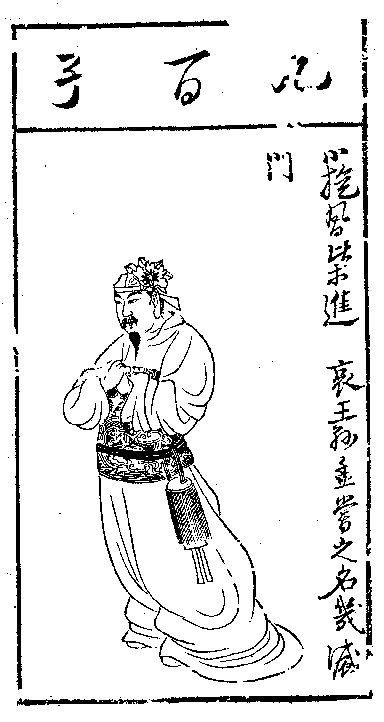
- an illustration of Chai Jin by Chen Hongshou
- First appearance: Chapter 9

In-universe information
- Aliases: "Nobleman Chai" 柴大官人; Ke Yin 柯引
- Nicknames: "Little Whirlwind" 小旋風
- Weapon: spear / lance
- Origin: nobleman
- Designation: Chief Accountant of Liangshan
- Rank: 10th, Noble Star (天貴星) of the 36 Heavenly Spirits
- Ancestral home / Place of origin: Cangzhou, Hebei

Chinese names
- Simplified Chinese: 柴进
- Traditional Chinese: 柴進
- Pinyin: Chái Jìn
- Wade–Giles: Ch'ai Chin

Chai Jin is a fictional character in Water Margin, one of the Classic Chinese Novels. Nicknamed "Little Whirlwind", he ranks 10th among the 36 Heavenly Spirits, the first third of the 108 Heroes.

== Background ==
The novel describes Chai Jin as a handsome-looking man with eyebrows like those of a dragon, eyes like those of a fenghuang, red lips, and sparkling teeth. He is a descendant of Chai Rong, the second emperor of the short-lived Later Zhou dynasty. Zhao Kuangyin, then a general of Later Zhou, had usurped the throne from the third Later Zhou emperor Chai Zongxun during the Chenqiao mutiny, and had then established the Song dynasty.

According to Water Margin, Zhao Kuangyin felt guilty for taking the throne from the Chai family, so he treated Chai Zhongxun and his descendants kindly and granted them numerous hereditary privileges. Among these is immunity from prosecution for all offences except capital offences; this privilege was awarded to them in the form of a danshu tiequan (丹書鐵券; "iron certificate inked in red"). Chai Jin inherits his ancestors' residence in Cangzhou, their wealth, and all their privileges, including the danshu tiequan.

In the novel, some of the 108 Heroes take shelter in Chai Jin's residence after becoming fugitives or outlaws because Chai can provide them sanctuary with his danshu tiequan, which also forbids the authorities from searching and making arrests within the Chai residence. A skillful martial artist himself, Chai Jin is known for befriending chivalrous people and being generous with his wealth. The outlaws at Liangshan Marsh regard him as their ally and protector embedded in high society.

== Imprisonment ==
Yin Tianxi is a brother-in-law of Gao Lian, the corrupt governor of Gaotangzhou (高唐州; around present-day Gaotang County, Shandong) and a cousin of the corrupt Grand Marshal Gao Qiu. He has been harassing Chai Jin's uncle, who lives in Gaotangzhou, to give up his mansion to him. When Chai Jin's uncle refuses, Yin Tianxi sends his goons to beat him up so badly that the elderly man ends up bedridden. When Chai Jin travels to Gaotangzhou to see his dying uncle, Yin Tianxi comes again to seize the mansion, threatening to use violence if Chai Jin refuses to step aside. The Liangshan outlaw Li Kui, who is accompanying Chai Jin at the time, is outraged so he attacks Yin Tianxi and beats him to death. Chai Jin orders Li Kui to leave immediately to avoid trouble.

Meanwhile, a furious Gao Lian orders Chai Jin to be arrested and imprisoned, completely disregarding Chai's danshu tiequan and "untouchable" status. In prison, Chai Jin is tortured and deprived of nourishment for days until he is on the verge of death. In the meantime, the Liangshan outlaws attack Gaotangzhou to free Chai Jin, and encounter a temporary setback when Gao Lian uses black magic against them. However, Liangshan's sorcerer Gongsun Sheng ultimately overcomes Gao Lian's black magic, allowing the outlaws to breach the city walls. The outlaws eventually find Chai Jin, who has been hidden at the bottom of a dried-up well, and manage to save him in time. Chai Jin recovers and joins the Liangshan outlaws.

== Becoming an outlaw ==
Chai Jin is placed in charge of Liangshan's accounts along with Li Ying after the 108 Heroes are fully assembled. He participates in the campaigns against the Liao invaders and rebel forces in Song territory after the outlaws receive amnesty from Emperor Huizong.

Midway during the campaign against Fang La's rebel forces, Chai Jin and Yan Qing infiltrate the rebel base, Qingxi County (清溪縣; present-day Chun'an County, Zhejiang), in disguise as merchants. Chai Jin, using the undercover name "Ke Yin" (柯引), meets Fang La and charms the rebel leader with his good looks and eloquence. Fang La then arranges for his daughter to marry "Ke Yin". In the final battle, Chai Jin and Yan Qing reveal their true identities and turn against Fang La, catching him off guard and allowing the Liangshan forces to defeat and capture Fang. Fang La's daughter hangs herself.

== Later life ==
By the time the campaigns are over, about two-thirds of the 108 Heroes have lost their lives in battle, to disease, or other causes. Chai Jin, one of the few survivors, is honoured by the emperor for his contributions during the campaign, and gets appointed as a general in Cangzhou. However, he resigns shortly after and returns home to live in comfort for the rest of his life.

== See also ==
- List of Water Margin minor characters#Chai Jin's story for a list of supporting minor characters from Chai Jin's story.
