= Mengzhou, Henan =

Mengzhou 孟州市
- County-level city
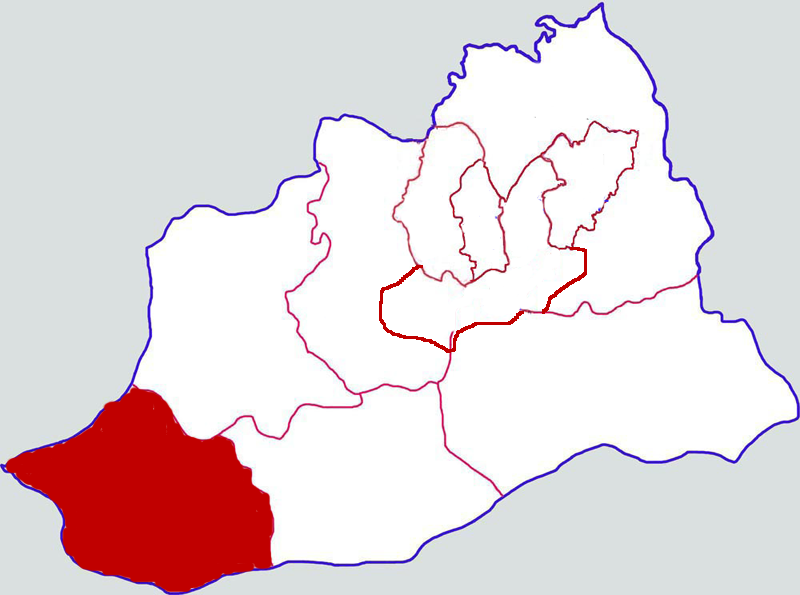
- Mengzhou in Jiaozuo

- Location of the city in Henan
- Coordinates: 34°54′26″N 112°47′29″E
- Country: People's Republic of China
- Province: Henan
- Prefecture-level city: Jiaozuo

Area
  - Total: 542 km^{2} (209 sq mi)

Population (2019)
  - Total: 375,800
- Time zone: UTC+8 (China Standard)
- Postal code: 454750

Mengzhou (Chinese: 孟州; pinyin: Mèngzhōu) is a county-level city in Henan province, People's Republic of China. It is administered by the prefecture-level city Jiaozuo. Its population in 1999 stood at 341,190.

== Administrative divisions ==
As of 2012, this city is divided to 4 subdistricts and 7 towns.

Subdistricts

- Dading Subdistrict (大定街道)
- Heyang Subdistrict (河阳街道)
- Heyong Subdistrict (河雍街道)
- Huichang Subdistrict (会昌街道)

Towns

- Chengbo (城伯镇)
- Gudan (谷旦镇)
- Huagong (化工镇)
- Huaishu (槐树乡)
- Nanzhuang (南庄镇)
- Xiguo (西虢镇)
- Zhaohe (赵和镇)

== Climate ==
Climate data for Mengzhou, elevation 128 m (420 ft), (1991–2020 normals, extremes 1981–2010)
Month	Jan	Feb	Mar	Apr	May	Jun	Jul	Aug	Sep	Oct	Nov	Dec	Year
Record high °C (°F)	20.1 (68.2)	25.0 (77.0)	29.5 (85.1)	38.2 (100.8)	40.9 (105.6)	42.8 (109.0)	41.1 (106.0)	38.2 (100.8)	39.4 (102.9)	35.5 (95.9)	28.3 (82.9)	22.9 (73.2)	42.8 (109.0)
Mean daily maximum °C (°F)	6.4 (43.5)	10.2 (50.4)	16.1 (61.0)	22.8 (73.0)	28.2 (82.8)	32.8 (91.0)	32.7 (90.9)	31.0 (87.8)	27.2 (81.0)	21.8 (71.2)	14.5 (58.1)	8.4 (47.1)	21.0 (69.8)
Daily mean °C (°F)	0.5 (32.9)	3.9 (39.0)	9.6 (49.3)	16.0 (60.8)	21.6 (70.9)	26.3 (79.3)	27.4 (81.3)	25.9 (78.6)	21.2 (70.2)	15.4 (59.7)	8.4 (47.1)	2.5 (36.5)	14.9 (58.8)
Mean daily minimum °C (°F)	−3.8 (25.2)	−0.9 (30.4)	4.1 (39.4)	9.9 (49.8)	15.5 (59.9)	20.2 (68.4)	23.1 (73.6)	21.9 (71.4)	16.8 (62.2)	10.7 (51.3)	3.7 (38.7)	−1.9 (28.6)	9.9 (49.9)
Record low °C (°F)	−13.2 (8.2)	−14.8 (5.4)	−6.8 (19.8)	−1.6 (29.1)	1.2 (34.2)	11.8 (53.2)	16.8 (62.2)	13.0 (55.4)	7.3 (45.1)	−2.5 (27.5)	−8.0 (17.6)	−11.3 (11.7)	−14.8 (5.4)
Average precipitation mm (inches)	8.8 (0.35)	11.1 (0.44)	20.2 (0.80)	35.3 (1.39)	52.2 (2.06)	75.5 (2.97)	120.8 (4.76)	93.5 (3.68)	74.3 (2.93)	39.0 (1.54)	26.4 (1.04)	6.1 (0.24)	563.2 (22.2)
Average precipitation days (≥ 0.1 mm)	3.5	3.9	5.0	6.3	7.3	7.5	10.8	9.9	9.0	7.0	5.5	2.9	78.6
Average snowy days	4.0	3.6	1.4	0.1	0	0	0	0	0	0	1.2	2.6	12.9
Average relative humidity (%)	60	59	59	62	62	61	76	79	76	71	67	60	66
Mean monthly sunshine hours	121.0	136.8	178.1	207.5	226.5	205.8	182.8	180.4	159.2	157.1	143.3	136.9	2,035.4
Percentage possible sunshine	38	44	48	53	52	48	42	44	43	45	47	45	46
Source: China Meteorological Administration

== Economy ==
Mengzhou's main industries are machinery manufacturing, fur processing, food processing, and chemical production. The city's GDP in 2006 was 8.68 billion yuan (1.09 billion USD).
