= Laizhou =

Laizhou 莱州市 Laichow
- County-level city
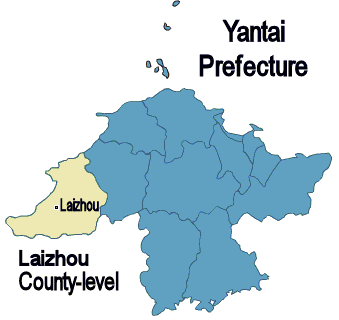
- Location of Laizhou's jurisdiction in Yantai

- Location in Shandong
- Country: People's Republic of China
- Province: Shandong
- Prefecture-level city: Yantai
- Divisions: County-level; Township-level: 11 townships, 5 subdistricts

Government
  - Type: County level City

Area
  - Total: 1,928 km^{2} (744 sq mi)

Population (2018)
  - Total: 843,600
- Time zone: UTC+8 (China Standard Time)
- Postal code: 261400
- Area code: 535

Laizhou, alternately romanized as Laichow, is a county-level city in the prefecture-level city of Yantai, Shandong Province, China. As of 2008, Laizhou had a population of 902,000, out of which 188,000 are urban residents.

Laizhou traditionally boasts strong economy due to its abundant natural resources, such as gold, magnesium, granite, and salt. Laizhou produces about 15% of the gold production of the whole nation, around 55,000 pounds annually. It is ranked 37th among other similarly sized cities in the nation and top 10 in Shandong Province. In 2010, the GDP of Laizhou reached US$7.3 billion. Laizhou Port is one of the major ports in the Yellow River Delta.

== Geography ==
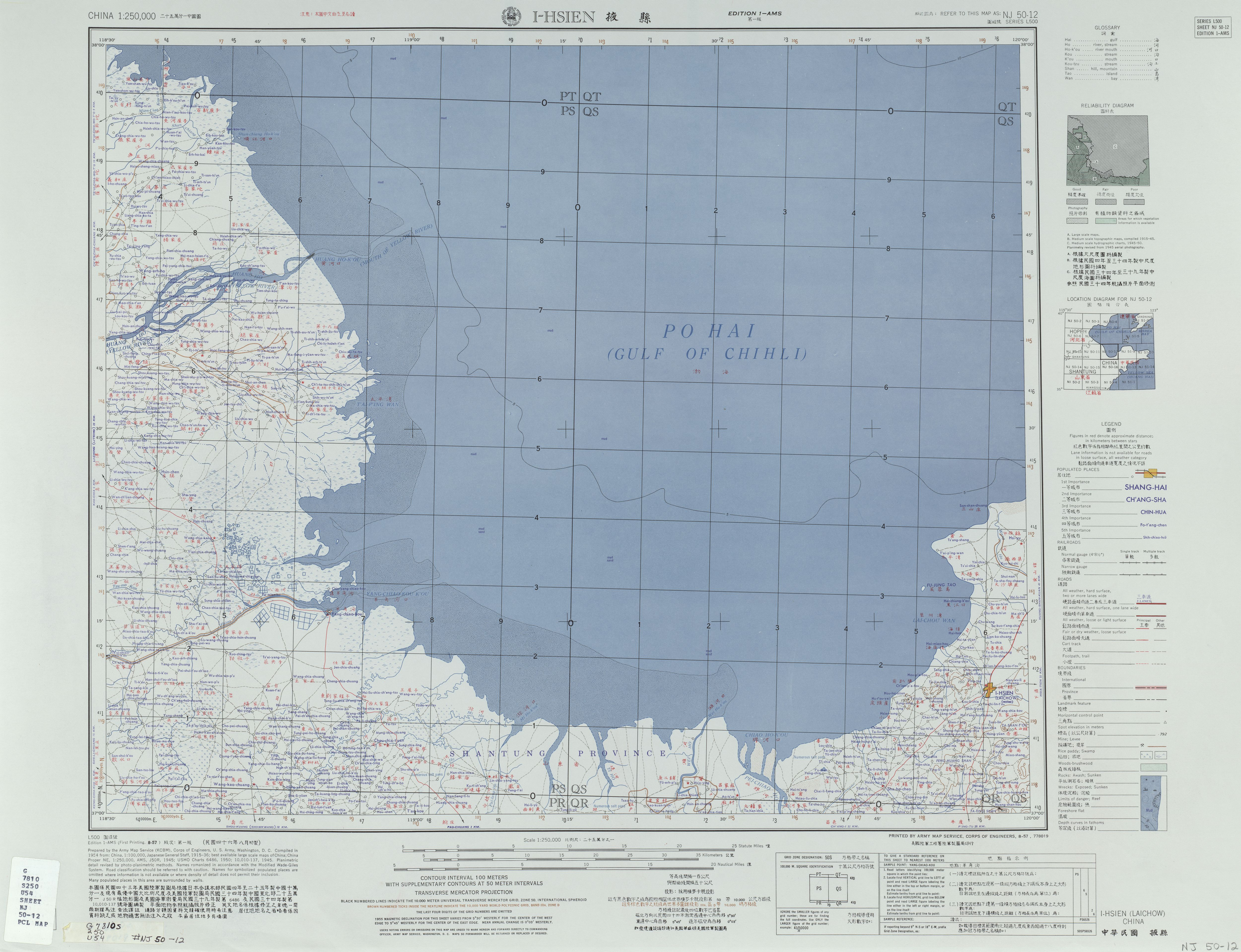
Laizhou (labelled as I-HSIEN (LAICHOW) 掖縣) (1954)

Laizhou
- Simplified Chinese: 莱州
- Traditional Chinese: 萊州
- Postal: Laichow
- Literal meaning: Goosefoot Prefecture
Transcriptions
Standard Mandarin
- Hanyu Pinyin: Láizhōu
- Wade–Giles: Lai-chou

Laizhou embraces Bohai Bay to its west border and is famous for swimming crabs and razor clams. Claimed as the Capital of the Chinese Rose, Laizhou hosts Chinese Rose Festival on May 25 every year, attracting thousands of visitors. Laizhou is also well known for its creative straw handmade crafts, one of Laizhou's main exporting commodities. Li Denghai, a Laizhou native, is called Godfather of Compact Planting Hybrid Maize for his contribution. Apple orchards and apple seedling nursery are popular in eastern part of Laizhou, led by one of the best apple seedling nurseries in China, Laizhou All Nature Horticultural Nursery in Xiao Caogou Village.

Laizhou No. 1 High School ranks among the top 100 high schools in China, has sent thousands of graduates to top universities all over the nation. Laizhou Martial Arts Institute was selected to participate in the 2008 Beijing Olympic Opening Ceremony.

Over the years, Laizhou has been awarded including: Top Longevity Cities of China, Excellent Tourist City in China, The Happiest City in China, Nation's Cleanest City, Best Corn Seed Region in China, Capital of Handmade Straw Crafts in China,

== Notable people ==
H. Bentley Glass (1906–2005), US geneticist, was born in Laizhou.

== Administrative divisions ==
As of 2012, this city is divided to 5 subdistricts and 11 towns.

Subdistricts

- Wenchanglu Subdistrict (文昌路街道)
- Yong'anlu Subdistrict (永安路街道)
- Sanshandao Subdistrict (三山岛街道)
- Chengganglu Subdistrict (城港路街道)
- Wenfenglu Subdistrict (文峰路街道)

Towns

- Shahe (沙河镇)
- Zhuqiao (朱桥镇)
- Guojiadian (郭家店镇)
- Jincheng (金城镇)
- Pinglidian (平里店镇)
- Yidao (驿道镇)
- Chengguo (程郭镇)
- Hutouya (虎头崖镇)
- Zhacun (柞村镇)
- Xiaqiu (夏邱镇)
- Tushan (土山镇)

== Climate ==
Climate data for Laizhou, elevation 48 m (157 ft), (1991–2020 normals, extremes 1981–present)
Month	Jan	Feb	Mar	Apr	May	Jun	Jul	Aug	Sep	Oct	Nov	Dec	Year
Record high °C (°F)	15.3 (59.5)	21.8 (71.2)	28.5 (83.3)	33.3 (91.9)	38.1 (100.6)	40.7 (105.3)	41.5 (106.7)	36.7 (98.1)	35.6 (96.1)	33.0 (91.4)	25.5 (77.9)	18.3 (64.9)	41.5 (106.7)
Mean daily maximum °C (°F)	2.8 (37.0)	5.9 (42.6)	12.2 (54.0)	19.4 (66.9)	25.3 (77.5)	29.4 (84.9)	31.1 (88.0)	30.1 (86.2)	26.4 (79.5)	20.2 (68.4)	12.3 (54.1)	5.2 (41.4)	18.4 (65.0)
Daily mean °C (°F)	−1.2 (29.8)	1.3 (34.3)	6.9 (44.4)	14.0 (57.2)	20.1 (68.2)	24.4 (75.9)	26.9 (80.4)	26.1 (79.0)	22.0 (71.6)	15.6 (60.1)	8.0 (46.4)	1.3 (34.3)	13.8 (56.8)
Mean daily minimum °C (°F)	−4.2 (24.4)	−2.3 (27.9)	2.8 (37.0)	9.4 (48.9)	15.4 (59.7)	20.1 (68.2)	23.3 (73.9)	22.8 (73.0)	18.1 (64.6)	11.6 (52.9)	4.5 (40.1)	−1.7 (28.9)	10.0 (50.0)
Record low °C (°F)	−13.9 (7.0)	−13.7 (7.3)	−8.2 (17.2)	−2.2 (28.0)	4.0 (39.2)	9.0 (48.2)	14.3 (57.7)	14.2 (57.6)	7.2 (45.0)	0.0 (32.0)	−7.3 (18.9)	−12.4 (9.7)	−13.9 (7.0)
Average precipitation mm (inches)	8.3 (0.33)	12.0 (0.47)	14.6 (0.57)	27.1 (1.07)	51.9 (2.04)	65.9 (2.59)	177.4 (6.98)	167.4 (6.59)	50.7 (2.00)	31.2 (1.23)	24.2 (0.95)	11.5 (0.45)	642.2 (25.27)
Average precipitation days (≥ 0.1 mm)	4.1	3.8	3.5	5.1	6.6	7.6	11.5	10.8	6.0	5.4	5.4	4.7	74.5
Average snowy days	6.5	4.4	1.7	0.2	0	0	0	0	0	0	2.0	5.8	20.6
Average relative humidity (%)	62	57	50	50	54	61	73	75	67	62	63	62	61
Mean monthly sunshine hours	172.6	178.9	231.4	250.3	274.9	249.5	219.0	220.0	222.4	213.5	170.3	163.5	2,566.3
Percentage possible sunshine	56	58	62	63	63	57	49	53	60	62	56	55	58
Source: China Meteorological Administration all-time extreme temperature

== Transport ==
- Laizhou railway station (Shandong), a station on the under construction Tianjin–Weifang–Yantai high-speed railway.

== See also ==
- Laizhou Bay
- Nanjusi, a village in Chengguo, Laizhou
