= Xuan =

Xuan (Chinese: 宣; Wade–Giles: Hsüan) may refer to:

- Xuancheng, formerly Xuan Prefecture (Xuanzhou), Anhui, China
  - Xuanzhou District, seat of Xuancheng and Xuan Prefecture
  - Xuan paper, from Xuan Prefecture
- Xuan (surname), Chinese surname
- Xuan (given name)

== Chinese rulers posthumously named Xuan ==
- King Xuan (disambiguation)
- Emperor Xuan (disambiguation)
- Duke Xuan (disambiguation)
- Marquis Xuan of Cai (died 715 BC), ruler of the State of Cai
