= Whan =

Whan or WHAN may refer to:

== People ==
- Bob Whan (born 1933), Australian politician
- Steve Whan (born 1964), Australian politician
- Toby Whan (born 2007), Australian rules footballer
- William Taylor Whan (1829-1901), Irish botanist

== Radio and television ==
- WHAN (AM), a radio station (1430 AM) licensed to Ashland, Virginia, United States
- WRLW-CD, a low-power television station (channel 21, virtual channel 17) licensed to serve Salem, Indiana, United States, which held the call sign WHAN-LP from 1996 to 2015
- Former callsign of WLVF-FM in Haines City, Florida, United States

== See also ==
- Wan (disambiguation)
- What (disambiguation)
- When (disambiguation)
- Hwan (disambiguation)
