= Xiao Rang =

Fictional character in the Chinese classical novel Water Margin

- Water Margin character
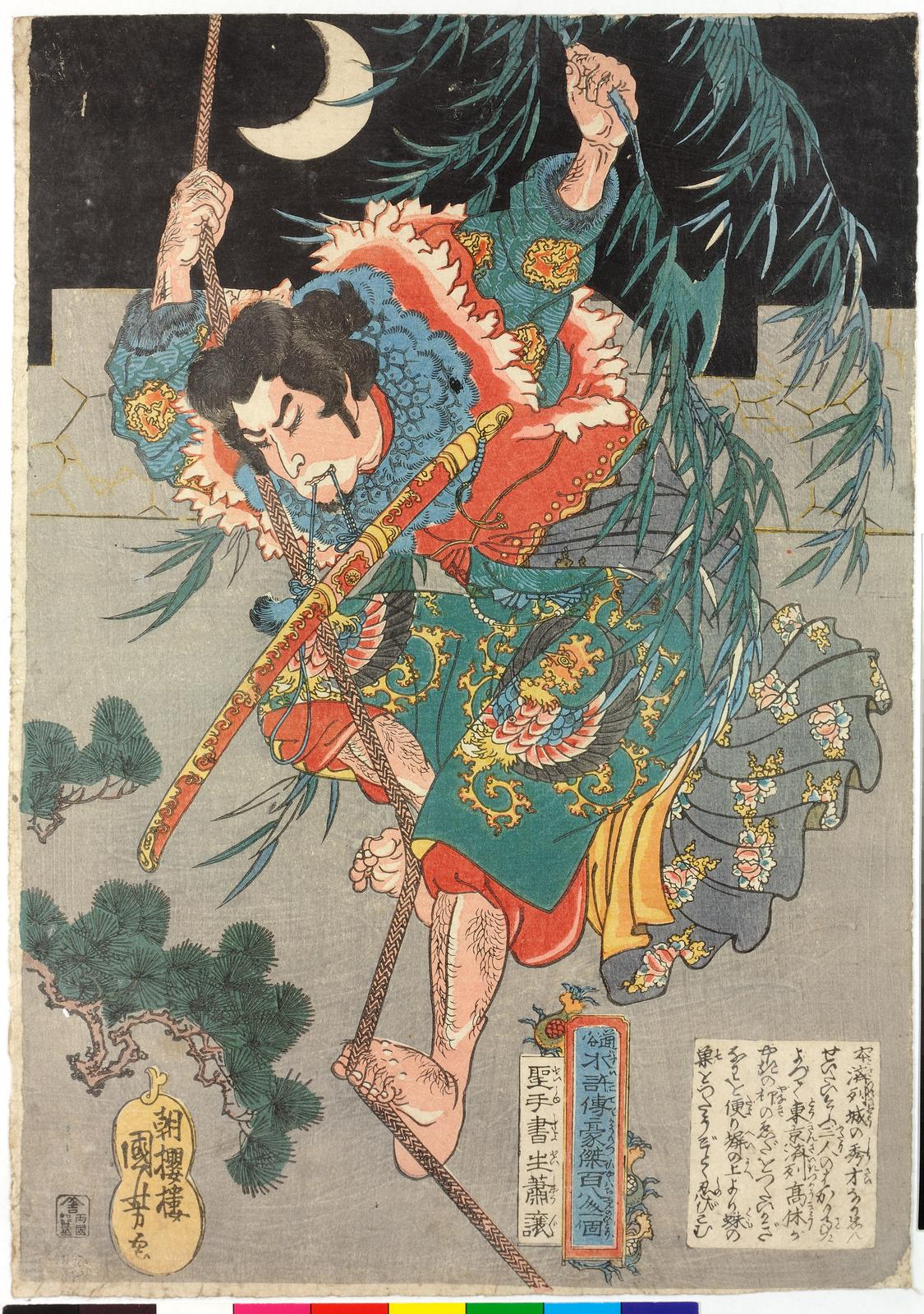
- an illustration of Xiao Rang by Utagawa Kuniyoshi
- First appearance: Chapter 39

In-universe information
- Nickname: "Sacred-handed Scholar" 聖手書生
- Origin: scholar, calligrapher
- Designation: Chief Secretary of Liangshan
- Rank: 46th, Literature Star (地文星) of the 72 Earthly Fiends
- Ancestral home / Place of origin: Jizhou (around present-day Jining and Heze, Shandong)

Chinese names
- Simplified Chinese: 萧让
- Traditional Chinese: 蕭讓
- Pinyin: Xiāo Ràng
- Wade–Giles: Hsiao Jang

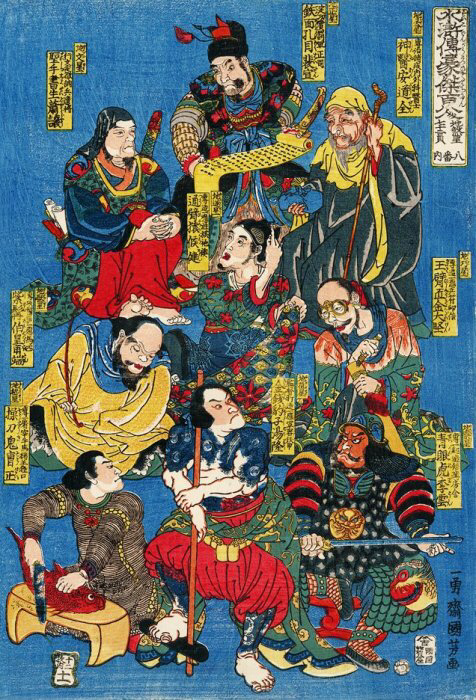
An illustration of nine of the 108 Heroes by Utagawa Kuniyoshi. Hou Jian is in the centre while the others (clockwise from the top) are Pei Xuan, An Daoquan, Jin Dajian, Li Yun, Tang Long, Cao Zheng, Huangfu Duan, and Xiao Rang.

Xiao Rang is a fictional character in Water Margin, one of the Classic Chinese Novels. Nicknamed "Sacred-handed Scholar", he ranks 46th among the 108 Heroes and tenth among the 72 Earthly Fiends.

== Background ==
Originally from Jizhou (濟州; around present-day Jining and Heze, Shandong), Xiao Rang is nicknamed "Sacred-handed Scholar" for not only his mastery of scholarly arts, but also his unique ability to imitate the distinctive calligraphy of the four most famous calligraphers of his time: Su Shi, Huang Tingjian, Mi Fu, and Cai Jing.

== Becoming an outlaw ==
Xiao Rang is first introduced in the novel as a friend of Wu Yong, who serves as the chief strategist of the outlaw band at Liangshan Marsh.

At the time, Song Jiang, whom the Liangshan outlaws highly respect as he has helped them before, has run into trouble in Jiangzhou (江州; present-day Jiujiang, Jiangxi) after writing a seditious poem while drunk. Cai Jiu, Jiangzhou's governor, has ordered Song Jiang to be arrested and has written to his father, Grand Tutor Cai Jing, to seek advice on how to deal with Song Jiang.

Cai Jiu has ordered Dai Zong to deliver a letter to his father in the capital Dongjing (東京; present-day Kaifeng, Henan). Unknown to him, Dai Zong secretly helps Song Jiang by heading to Liangshan instead to seek help from the outlaws.

Wu Yong, knowing of Xiao Rang's special talent, enlists his help to forge a letter in Cai Jing's calligraphy to order Cai Jiu to have Song Jiang escorted as a prisoner from Jiangzhou to Dongjing, thereby giving the outlaws the chance to intercept and save him along the way. The craftsman Jin Dajian, also recruited by Wu Yong, adds the finishing touch by carving a replica of Cai Jing's official seal and stamping it on the letter.

Dai Zong delivers the forged letter to Cai Jiu, who is initially fooled. However, the forgery is exposed when it is discovered that the seal used on the letter is not appropriate for private correspondence between father and son. Enraged, Cai Jiu orders Dai Zong's arrest, and sentences both him and Song Jiang to death. Luckily, the Liangshan outlaws have realised the mistake earlier and shown up in full force in Jiangzhou, storming the execution ground and saving the two men in time.

== Life at Liangshan ==
Xiao Rang is appointed as the chief secretary of Liangshan after the 108 Heroes are fully assembled.

When Gao Qiu leads government forces to attack Liangshan, the outlaws defeat the enemy and capture Gao himself. Song Jiang, who has become the chief of the Liangshan outlaws, releases Gao Qiu as a gesture of goodwill as he hopes that Emperor Huizong will grant all the outlaws amnesty and give them a chance to serve the ruling Song dynasty. Xiao Rang and Yue He are sent by Song Jiang to accompany Gao Qiu back to the capital to meet the emperor.

Although Gao Qiu had earlier agreed to help the outlaws convey their wish for amnesty to the emperor, he breaks his promise upon returning to the capital, and detains Xiao Rang and Yue He in his residence. However, the outlaws have sent Dai Zong and Yan Qing to secretly keep a close eye on Gao Qiu. Dai Zong and Yan Qing break into Gao Qiu's residence and extricate Xiao Rang and Yue He.

== Campaigns ==
Despite facing setbacks along the way, the Liangshan outlaws eventually receive amnesty from the emperor with the help of the courtesan Li Shishi and other government officials. The emperor then sends them on campaigns against the Liao invaders and rebel forces in Song territory. Xiao Rang participates in the campaigns and makes contributions in battle.

During the campaign against Wang Qing's rebel forces, Xiao Rang and two other Liangshan heroes (Jin Dajian and Pei Xuan) are captured by the enemy in Jingnan (荊南; around present-day Jingzhou, Hubei). Although they are tortured, the three of them refuse to surrender and divulge any information. They are freed only when Wang Qing's subordinate starts a mutiny.

Before the Liangshan heroes go on their last campaign against Fang La's rebel forces, Xiao Rang is summoned to the capital to serve as Cai Jing's private secretary.
