= Huan =

Huan may refer to:

== People ==
- Marquis Huan of Cai (died 695 BC), ruler of Cai
- King Huan of Zhou (died 697 BC)
- Huan Yi (fl. 234 BC), Qin general
- Emperor Huan of Han (132–168)
- Sun Huan (Jiming) (194–234), Eastern Wu military general
- Sun Huan (Shuwu) (fl. 219–222), Eastern Wu military general
- Cao Huan (246–302), last emperor of Cao Wei
- Huan Wen (312–373), Jin dynasty general
- Huan Huo (320-377), Jin dynasty general
- Huan Chong (328–384), Jin dynasty governor and general
- Huan Xuan (369–404), warlord who briefly seized the imperial throne
- Gao Huan (496–547), general and minister of Northern Wei and Eastern Wei
- Duke Huan (disambiguation)
- Xie Huan (fl. 1426–1452), Chinese painter
- Lee Huan (1917–2010), Taiwanese politician, Premier of the Republic of China
- Liu Huan (born 1963), Chinese singer and songwriter
- Zhang Huan (born 1965), Chinese artist
- Huan Sinan (born 2007), Chinese basketball player

== Other uses ==
- Huan County, Gansu, China
- Huan River, a tributary of the Yellow River in China
- Huan (Middle-earth), a fictional hound from J. R. R. Tolkien's fantasy writings

== See also ==
- Three Huan, three aristocratic clans, all descendants of Duke Huan of Lu
- ǂHûân, the former dialectical name of the ǂʼAmkoe language from Botswana
- Hwan (disambiguation)
- Juan
- Xuan (disambiguation)
- Yuan (disambiguation)
