= Yuanzong =

Yuanzong (Yüan-tsung in Wade–Giles) may refer to the following Chinese emperors:

- Emperor Ping of Han (9 BC – 6 AD), or Emperor Yuanzong of Han
- Li Jing (Southern Tang) (916–961), or Emperor Yuanzong of (Southern) Tang
- Zhu Hengjia (1583–1646?), self-declared Southern Ming regent during the Qing invasion of China, posthumously honored as Emperor Yuanzong by some Ming loyalists

== See also ==
- Wonjong (disambiguation) (Korean equivalent)
- Emperor Yuan (disambiguation)
- Xuanzong (disambiguation)
