= Jin Dajian =

Fictional character in the Chinese classical novel Water Margin

- Water Margin character
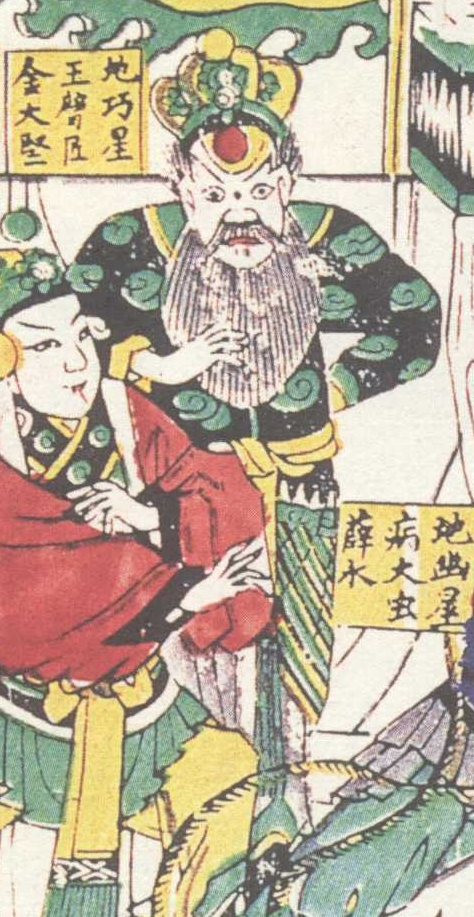
- a Qing dynasty illustration of Jin Dajian
- First appearance: Chapter 39

In-universe information
- Nickname: "Jade Armed Craftsman" 玉臂匠
- Origin: craftsman
- Designation: Head Craftsman of Liangshan
- Rank: 66th, Skilful Star (地巧星) of the 72 Earthly Fiends
- Ancestral home / Place of origin: Jizhou (around present-day Jining and Heze, Shandong)

Chinese names
- Simplified Chinese: 金大坚
- Traditional Chinese: 金大堅
- Pinyin: Jīn Dàjiān
- Wade–Giles: Chin Ta-chien

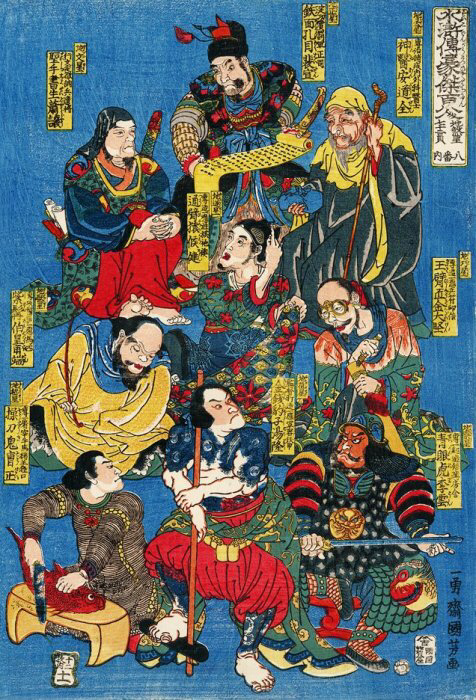
An illustration of nine of the 108 Heroes by Utagawa Kuniyoshi. Hou Jian is in the centre while the others (clockwise from the top) are Pei Xuan, An Daoquan, Jin Dajian, Li Yun, Tang Long, Cao Zheng, Huangfu Duan, and Xiao Rang.

Jin Dajian is a fictional character in Water Margin, one of the Classic Chinese Novels. Nicknamed "Jade Armed Craftsman", he ranks 66th among the 108 Heroes and 30th among the 72 Earthly Fiends.

== Background ==
Originally from Jizhou (濟州; around present-day Jining and Heze, Shandong), Jin Dajian is nicknamed "Jade Armed Craftsman" for his skill in carving seals, stone tablets, and exquisite designs on jade.

== Becoming an outlaw ==
Jin Dajian is first introduced in the novel as an acquaintance of Wu Yong, who serves as the chief strategist of the outlaw band at Liangshan Marsh.

At the time, Song Jiang, whom the Liangshan outlaws highly respect as he has helped them before, has run into trouble in Jiangzhou (江州; present-day Jiujiang, Jiangxi) after writing a seditious poem while drunk. Cai Jiu, Jiangzhou's governor, has ordered Song Jiang to be arrested and has written to his father, Grand Tutor Cai Jing, to seek advice on how to deal with Song Jiang.

Cai Jiu has ordered Dai Zong to deliver a letter to his father in the capital Dongjing (東京; present-day Kaifeng, Henan). Unknown to him, Dai Zong secretly helps Song Jiang by heading to Liangshan instead to seek help from the outlaws.

Wu Yong, knowing of Jin Dajian's talent, enlists his help to forge a letter from Cai Jing to Cai Jiu to have Song Jiang escorted as a prisoner from Jiangzhou to Dongjing, thereby giving the outlaws the chance to intercept and save him along the way. Wu Yong also enlists the help of Xiao Rang, a scholar known for his unique ability to imitate Cai Jing's distinctive calligraphy, to write the letter. Jin Dajian adds the finishing touch by carving a replica of Cai Jing's official seal and stamping it on the letter.

Dai Zong delivers the forged letter to Cai Jiu, who is initially fooled. However, the forgery is exposed when it is discovered that the seal used on the letter is not appropriate for private correspondence between father and son. Enraged, Cai Jiu orders Dai Zong's arrest, and sentences both him and Song Jiang to death. Luckily, the Liangshan outlaws have realised the mistake earlier and shown up in full force in Jiangzhou, storming the execution ground and saving the two men in time.

== Campaigns ==
Jin Dajian is appointed as the head craftsman of Liangshan, overseeing all engraving works and the carving of seals, after the 108 Heroes are fully assembled. He participates in the campaigns against the Liao invaders and rebel forces in Song territory after the outlaws receive amnesty from Emperor Huizong.

During the campaign against Wang Qing's rebel forces, Jin Dajian and two other Liangshan heroes (Xiao Rang and Pei Xuan) are captured by the enemy in Jingnan (荊南; around present-day Jingzhou, Hubei). Although they are tortured, the three of them refuse to surrender and divulge any information. They are freed only when Wang Qing's subordinate starts a mutiny.

Before the Liangshan heroes go on their last campaign against Fang La's rebel forces, Jin Dajian is summoned to the capital to serve as an imperial craftsman under the emperor.
