= Zhu Hengjia =

Chinese prince (1583–1645)

Zhu Hengjia 朱亨嘉

Prince of Jingjiang
- Reign: 1638–1646
- Predecessor: Zhu Lühu, Prince Rongmu
- Successor: Zhu Hengyin
- Born: 1583
- Died: 1646 (aged 62–63)
- Burial: Purple Mountain
- Issue: Zhu Ruoji (Shitao)
Names
- Zhu Hengjia (朱亨嘉)
Era name and dates
- Xingye (興業): 22 September – 14 October 1645
- House: Zhu
- Father: Zhu Lühu, Prince Rongmu of Jingjiang

Zhu Hengjia (朱亨嘉, 1583–1646?) was the 12th Prince of Jingjiang. He was a 10th generation descendant of Zhu Shouqian, 12th descendant of Zhu Xinglong, brother of the Hongwu Emperor. His son was Shitao (born Zhu Ruoji), who was a Chinese landscape painter and poet during the early part of the Qing dynasty. Zhu claimed himself as regent of the Ming dynasty but was later defeated and killed during the Qing conquest of the Ming.

== Biography ==
After Zhu Yousong was defeated, Zhu Hengjia declared himself as Regent (監國) at Guangxi under support of Yang Guowei (楊國威), General soldiers of Guangxi, officer Gu Yi (顧奕) and the others.

After Qu Shisi (瞿式耜) knew he had been arrogated as regent, he ordered the officials of Guangxi not to obey his orders and ordered a general named Chen Bangzhuan (陳邦傅) to defend him. As Qu Shisi disobeyed Zhu Hengjia, Zhu went to Wuzhou to capture Qu and arrest him at Guilin.

At the same time, Zhu Yujian has been enthroned as Longwu Emperor, and Qu Shisi ordered his men to congratulate him and requested Zhu Yujian to seize Zhu Hengjia. After Ding Kuichu (丁魁楚) attacked Wuzhou, Zhu Hengjia escaped to Guilin. Then, Zhu released Qu Shisi and hoped that Qu would help him. However, Qu Shisi captured Zhu. Later, Zhu Hengjia was escorted to Fujian and killed.

== Death ==
There are many different records about Zhu Hengjia's end:

- "Hengjia, Yang Guowei and Gu Yi got captured and escorted to Fujian, Yang and Gu got killed and Hengjia died in the prison."
- "Hengjia died due to sick."
- "Hengjia and Guowei got captured and escorted to Fuzhou, they later got killed"
- "The Prince of Tang (Zhu Yujian) demoted Hengjia, the Prince of Jingjiang as commoner. Ding Kuichu escorted Hengjia, Yang Guowei, Gu Yi and Shi Qiwen to the quinsay at Jianning, the Emperor meeting with Prince of Huai and Prince of Chu, they later agreed to do not demoting him and placed him at Lianjiang."

== Ancestry ==
Zhu Jingfu, Prince Ansu of Jingjiang (1493–1525)
Zhu Bangning, Prince Gonghui of Jingjiang (1513–1572)
Lady Liu
Zhu Rensheng, Prince Xianding of Jingjiang (1538–1609)
Lady Zheng
Zhu Lühu, Prince Rongmu of Jingjiang (1568–1635)
Lady Bai
Zhu Hengjia, Prince of Jingjiang (1583–1646)

Zhu Hengjia House of Zhu Born: 1583 Died: 1646
Chinese royalty
Preceded by Zhu Lühu, Prince Rongmu	Prince of Jingjiang; 1638–1646	Succeeded by Zhu Hengyin
