= Zhu Wenzheng =

Ming dynasty military figure and imperial kinsman

- 朱文正
- Born: Unknown
- Died: 1360s
- Children: Zhu Shouqian
- Military career
- Allegiance: Zhu Yuanzhang
- Rank: Grand Commandant
- Conflicts: Battle of Hongdu

Zhu Wenzheng (Chinese: 朱文正; pinyin: Zhū Wénzhèng; Wade–Giles: Chu Wen-cheng; died 1360s), childhood name Lüma (驢馬), was a military figure in the late Yuan dynasty and a kinsman of the future imperial family of the Ming dynasty. He was the nephew of Zhu Yuanzhang, the future Hongwu Emperor, and the son of Zhu Xinglong, Prince of Nanchang. His wife Xie Cuiying was the elder sister of Xie Cuie, the wife of Xu Da.

== Biography ==
Zhu Wenzheng's father Zhu Xinglong was the elder brother of Zhu Yuanzhang. Zhu Xinglong died during the famine in the Huai region in 1344. Because of the severity of the famine, Zhu Xinglong's wife, Lady Wang, left the Zhu family with her son Zhu Wenzheng. After learning that her husband's younger brother Zhu Yuanzhang had joined the Red Turbans and captured Chuzhou, she and Zhu Wenzheng went to join him. Zhu Yuanzhang raised Zhu Wenzheng as if he were his own son.

Zhu Wenzheng was brave and skilled in battle. He crossed the Yangtze with Zhu Yuanzhang's forces and took part in the capture of Jinling. Because of his repeated military achievements, he was promoted to assistant administrator of the Bureau of Military Affairs. Zhu Yuanzhang once asked him what office he wished to hold. Zhu Wenzheng replied that if his uncle succeeded in his great enterprise, wealth and honour would naturally follow, and that granting offices and rewards first to relatives would make it difficult to command public respect. Zhu Yuanzhang was pleased by this answer and became even fonder of him.

In 1363, when Zhu Yuanzhang held the title Prince of Wu, he appointed Zhu Wenzheng as Grand Commandant and gave him command over military affairs. After Jiangxi was again brought under control, Zhu Wenzheng was stationed at Hongdu, present-day Nanchang, to guard the southwest. The position was considered so important that only a close imperial kinsman or a senior trusted minister could hold it.

When Chen Youliang led a large army to besiege Hongdu, Zhu Wenzheng resisted him in the Battle of Hongdu. He repeatedly repelled Chen's assaults and held the city for eighty-five days until Zhu Yuanzhang personally led reinforcements. Chen then lifted the siege and withdrew to Poyang Lake, where he confronted Zhu Yuanzhang. Zhu Wenzheng also cut Chen's supply routes, contributing to Chen's eventual defeat. He later sent He Wenhui and others to attack prefectures and counties that had not yet submitted.

Zhu Wenzheng received great credit for the pacification of Jiangxi. However, he later became dissolute and violent. According to Liu Chen's Guochu shiji, he entrusted clerks such as Wei Dake with authority, abducted women from local households, and caused many deaths. Zhu Yuanzhang recalled him for punishment. Guo Zizhang, Liu Zhongfu, Wei Dake and Wang the marshal were executed for failing to remonstrate with him, and more than fifty of Zhu Wenzheng's attendants and subordinates were punished by having the tendons of their feet cut.

After Zhu Yuanzhang returned to the capital, he richly rewarded generals such as Chang Yuchun and Liao Yongzhong with gold and silk. Zhu Wenzheng, despite his achievements, was not rewarded. Angered, he became increasingly unrestrained and allowed his subordinates to plunder the wives and daughters of those under his authority. The surveillance commissioner Li Yinbing memorialized that Zhu Wenzheng had become arrogant and resentful. Zhu Yuanzhang sent an envoy to reprimand him. Zhu Wenzheng became afraid, and Li Yinbing further reported that he harboured disloyal intentions.

Zhu Yuanzhang immediately travelled by boat to the city and summoned Zhu Wenzheng. When Zhu Wenzheng came out hurriedly to meet him, Zhu Yuanzhang repeatedly asked, "What are you planning to do?" Zhu Wenzheng was then escorted back to Jinling. Empress Ma interceded on his behalf, saying that the young man was merely strong-willed and had no other intention. Zhu Wenzheng was therefore dismissed from office and placed under house arrest at Tongcheng, where he died not long afterwards.

== Aftermath ==
In 1370, Zhu Yuanzhang, by then the Hongwu Emperor, enfeoffed Zhu Wenzheng's eight-year-old son Zhu Shouqian as Prince of Jingjiang and sent him to his fief at Guilin. Zhu Shouqian became the only Ming princely ruler who was not descended from Zhu Yuanzhang himself.

== See also ==
- Zhu Shouqian
- Prince of Jingjiang
