= Dai Zong =

Fictional character in the Chinese classical novel Water Margin

- Water Margin character
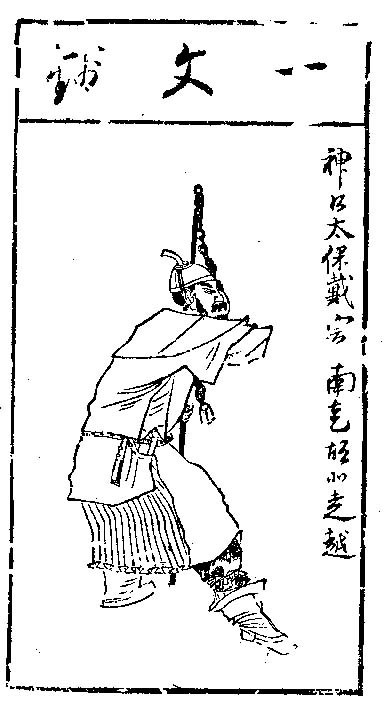
- an illustration of Dai Zong by Chen Hongshou
- First appearance: Chapter 38

In-universe information
- Nicknames: "Magic Traveller" 神行太保
- Weapon: sword
- Origin: prison warden
- Designation: Reconnaissance Chief of Liangshan
- Rank: 20th, Speed Star (天速星) of the 36 Heavenly Spirits

Chinese names
- Simplified Chinese: 戴宗
- Traditional Chinese: 戴宗
- Pinyin: Dài Zōng
- Wade–Giles: Tai Tsung

Dai Zong is a fictional character in Water Margin, one of the Classic Chinese Novels. Nicknamed "Magic Traveller", he ranks 20th among the 36 Heavenly Spirits, the first third of the 108 Heroes.

== Background ==
Dai Zong is described in the novel as a man with a broad face, a squarish mouth, and a lean body. He serves as a prison warden in Jiangzhou (江州; present-day Jiujiang, Jiangxi) and is a friend of Wu Yong, the chief strategist of the outlaw band at Liangshan Marsh.

Nicknamed "Magic Traveller", he has a special ability which allows him to travel on foot at an incredibly fast speed, up to 800 li in a day, by incanting a magic spell that activates the power of four jiamas (甲馬; a paper talisman) attached to his legs.

== Meeting Song Jiang ==
When Song Jiang is exiled to Jiangzhou after helping the outlaws, he passes by Liangshan Marsh and receives a letter from Wu Yong, who tells him to deliver it to Dai Zong. In Jiangzhou, Dai Zong initially hints to Song Jiang that he wants a bribe in exchange for lenient treatment in prison. After Song Jiang privately passes him Wu Yong's letter, Dai Zong realises who Song Jiang is and immediately apologises. He treats Song Jiang respectfully and allows him to freely enter and exit the prison while serving his sentence. At the same time, he introduces Song Jiang to Li Kui, who is serving as a jailer under him then.

Song Jiang later runs into trouble after writing a seditious poem in a drunken stupor. The poem is discovered and reported to Jiangzhou's governor, Cai Jiu, by Huang Wenbing, a petty man seeking to ingratiate himself with the governor. When Song Jiang is arrested and put on trial, Dai Zong secretly suggests to him to feign insanity. Cai Jiu initially believes that Song Jiang is a madman and dismisses the case, but Huang Wenbing sees through the ruse and urges Cai Jiu to torture the suspect to force a confession. After being severely beaten, Song Jiang drops the pretence and gets thrown into prison.

== Becoming an outlaw ==
Unsure of how to deal with the suspect, Cai Jiu writes to his father Cai Jing, who is serving as the Grand Preceptor in the capital Dongjing (東京; present-day Kaifeng, Henan), to seek advice, and orders Dai Zong to deliver the letter. While resting at an inn near Liangshan Marsh, Dai Zong is drugged and taken captive by the outlaws, who take him to their stronghold.

At Liangshan, Dai Zong meets Wu Yong again and works out a plan with him to save Song Jiang. Wu Yong recruits the scholar Xiao Rang, who can imitate Cai Jing's distinctive calligraphy, and the engraver Jin Dajian, who is known for his seal-carving skill. Xiao Rang forges a letter from Cai Jing to Cai Jiu, ordering him to send Song Jiang to Dongjing for further action, while Jin Dajian stamps a replica of Cai Jing's official seal on the letter. The outlaws will then ambush the soldiers escorting Song Jiang en route to Dongjing and save him.

Dai Zong then returns to Jiangzhou with the fake letter and nearly fools Cai Jiu, until Huang Wenbing notices that the official seal is not appropriate for private correspondence between father and son, exposing the forgery. Furious that Dai Zong has betrayed him, Cai Jiu orders Dai to be thrown into prison as well. At Huang Wenbing's urging, Cai Jiu sentences Dai Zong and Song Jiang to public execution by beheading. Luckily for them, the Liangshan outlaws have realised the mistake shortly after Dai Zong left, and have shown up in full force in Jiangzhou. Together with Li Kui, the outlaws storm the execution ground, fend off the government forces sent to arrest them, and save Dai Zong and Song Jiang. All of them safely return to the outlaw stronghold at Liangshan.

== Life at Liangshan ==
Dai Zong serves Liangshan well with his special ability, often helping the outlaws gather intel and deliver reports to and fro the frontline during battles against government forces. On one occasion, he also befriends and recruits Yang Lin to join Liangshan after the latter recognises him from his special ability.

When the outlaws are attacking Gaotangzhou (高唐州; around present-day Gaotang County, Shandong) to rescue their imprisoned ally Chai Jin, they encounter a setback when Gaotangzhou's governor Gao Lian uses black magic against them. Song Jiang, who is leading the outlaws in the battle, sends Dai Zong and Li Kui to Jizhou (薊州; present-day Ji County, Tianjin) to find Liangshan's sorcerer Gongsun Sheng, who has gone home to visit his mother. Dai Zong uses his special ability to transport everyone to and fro, allowing Gongsun Sheng to reach Gaotangzhou quickly and help the outlaws defeat Gao Lian.

In another instance, Dai Zong uses his special ability to ferry the physician An Daoquan to Liangshan to heal Song Jiang of a deadly tumour.

== Campaigns and death ==
Dai Zong is appointed as the chief of Liangshan's reconnaissance team after the 108 Heroes are fully assembled. He participates in the campaigns against the Liao invaders and rebel forces in Song territory after the outlaws receive amnesty from Emperor Huizong, and is one of the few Liangshan heroes who survive the final campaign against Fang La's rebel forces.

To honour Dai Zong for his contributions during the campaign, the emperor appoints him as a military officer in Yanzhou (兗州; around present-day Jining, Shandong). However, he soon resigns and chooses to lead a reclusive, monastic life in the Dai Temple in Tai'an Prefecture. Some months later, he dies after breaking out in laughter.
