= Tang Long (Water Margin) =

Fictional character in the Chinese classical novel Water Margin

- Water Margin character
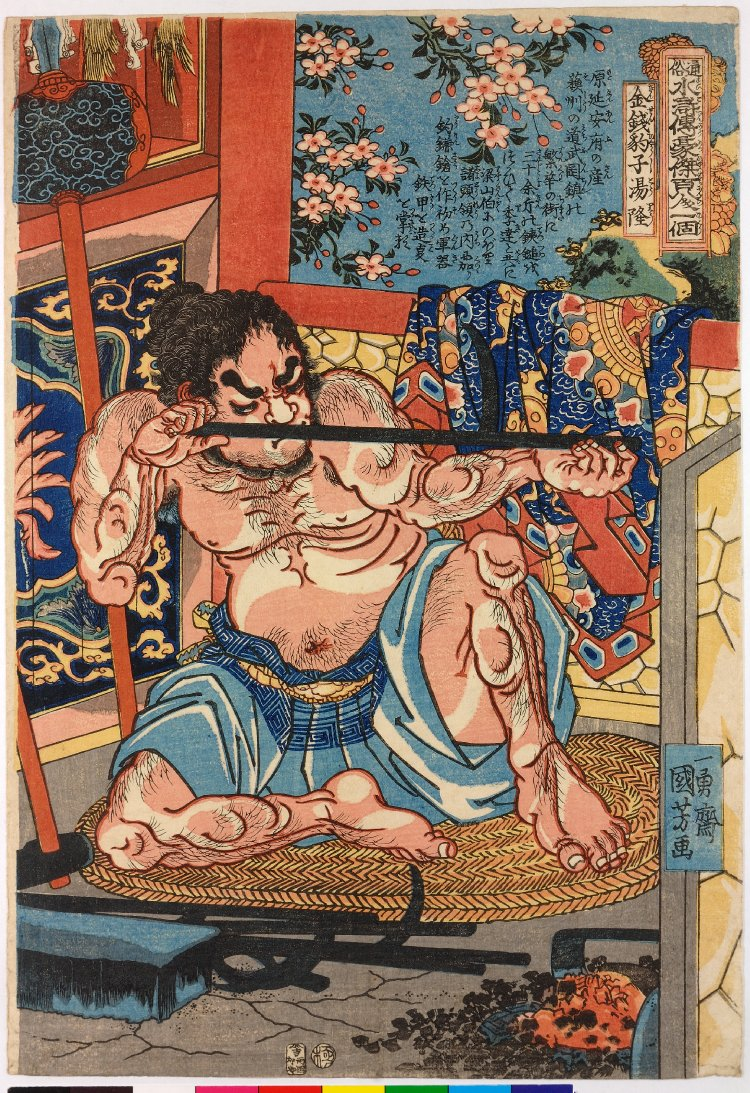
- an illustration of Tang Long by Utagawa Kuniyoshi
- First appearance: Chapter 54

In-universe information
- Nickname: "Gold Coin Spotted Leopard" 金錢豹子
- Origin: blacksmith
- Designation: Chief Armourer of Liangshan
- Rank: 88th, Solitary Star (地孤星) of the 72 Earthly Fiends
- Ancestral home / Place of origin: Yan'an Prefecture (present-day Yan'an, Shaanxi)

Chinese names
- Simplified Chinese: 汤隆
- Traditional Chinese: 湯隆
- Pinyin: Tāng Lóng
- Wade–Giles: T'ang Lung

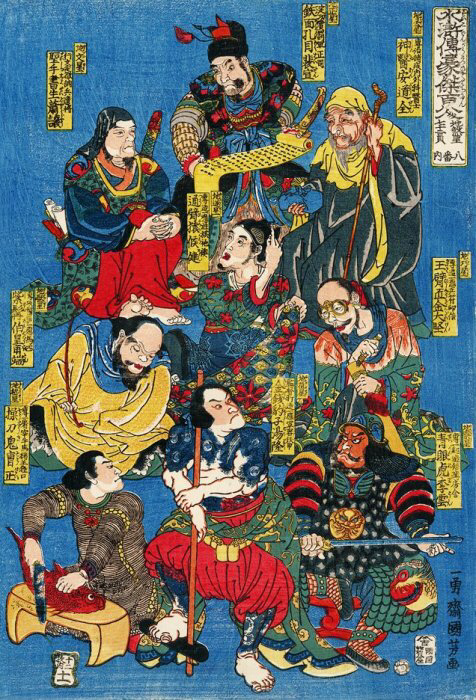
An illustration of nine of the 108 Heroes by Utagawa Kuniyoshi. Hou Jian is in the centre while the others (clockwise from the top) are Pei Xuan, An Daoquan, Jin Dajian, Li Yun, Tang Long, Cao Zheng, Huangfu Duan, and Xiao Rang.

Tang Long is a fictional character in Water Margin, one of the Classic Chinese Novels. Nicknamed "Gold Coin Spotted Leopard", he ranks 52nd among the 72 Earthly Fiends and 88th among the 108 Heroes.

== Background ==
The novel describes Tang Long as a seven chi-tall man dappled with freckles from head to toe, hence he is nicknamed "Gold Coin Spotted Leopard". His ancestors were blacksmiths by trade and his father had once served as an official in Yan'an Prefecture (延安府; present-day Yan'an, Shaanxi). After his father's death, he has been drifting from place to place while earning a living as a blacksmith to support his gambling habits. He is also trained in martial arts and specialises in using pole weapons such as the spear / lance and staff.

== Joining Liangshan ==
Tang Long is first introduced in the novel when he is entertaining a crowd on the street by using a huge mallet to smash a boulder. Li Kui, an outlaw from Liangshan Marsh, witnesses Tang Long's feat and steps forth to attempt it too. Tang Long, who is initially doubtful, is surprised when Li Kui easily wields the mallet. After introducing themselves to each other, Li Kui invites Tang Long to join the outlaw band as he sees great value in Tang's metalworking skill. Tang Long gladly accepts and becomes an outlaw.

== Recruiting Xu Ning ==
Tang Long is mentioned again in the novel when he speaks up to recommend his maternal cousin Xu Ning, who serves as a martial arts instructor to the imperial guards in the capital Dongjing (東京; present-day Kaifeng, Henan), to join the Liangshan outlaw band. At the time, the outlaws are fighting government forces led by Huyan Zhuo, who has deployed a chain-linked armoured cavalry formation that the outlaws cannot overcome. Tang Long points out that Xu Ning, who is a master of the hooked lance, can train the Liangshan infantry in using this unique weapon to counter the cavalry formation's weakness: the horses' legs.

Song Jiang, the Liangshan commander, approves Tang Long's idea and sends him along with Shi Qian and others to Dongjing to recruit Xu Ning. Shi Qian sneaks into Xu Ning's house at night and steals his family heirloom – a golden armoured vest impervious to sharp weapons – and lures Xu to chase him. Tang Long then shows up and offers to help his cousin catch the thief and retrieve the vest, luring Xu Ning closer and closer to Liangshan. At one point, Xu Ning loses consciousness after unsuspectingly accepting a drink spiked with menghanyao (蒙汗藥) and gets taken to Liangshan, where he eventually agrees to join the outlaw band.

While Tang Long takes charge of forging the hooked lances, Xu Ning oversees the training of selected Liangshan foot soldiers in using the weapon. The Liangshan outlaws ultimately overcome Huyan Zhuo's cavalry formation and inflict a crushing defeat on the government forces.

== Campaigns and death ==
Tang Long is appointed as Liangshan's chief armourer after the 108 Heroes are fully assembled. He participates in the campaigns against the Liao invaders and rebel forces in Song territory after the outlaws receive amnesty from Emperor Huizong.

During the final campaign against Fang La's rebel forces, Tang Long is critically wounded at the battle of Qingxi County (清溪縣; present-day Chun'an County, Zhejiang) and ultimately succumbs to his injuries.
