= Li Yun (Water Margin) =

Fictional character in the Chinese classical novel Water Margin

- Water Margin character
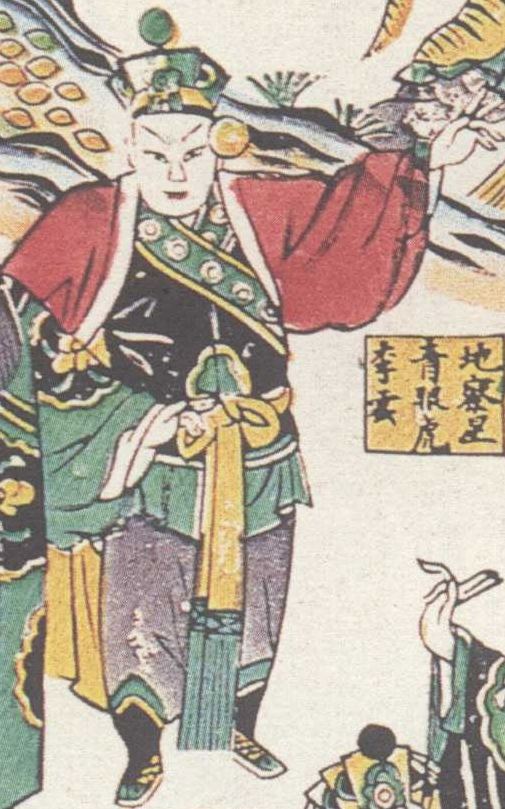
- a Qing dynasty illustration of Li Yun
- First appearance: Chapter 43

In-universe information
- Nickname: "Green-eyed Tiger" 青眼虎
- Weapon: sabre
- Origin: constable
- Designation: Construction Supervisor of Liangshan
- Rank: 97th, Detective Star (地察星) of the 72 Earthly Fiends
- Ancestral home / Place of origin: Yishui County (in present-day Linyi, Shandong)

Chinese names
- Simplified Chinese: 李云
- Traditional Chinese: 李雲
- Pinyin: Lǐ Yún
- Wade–Giles: Li Yün

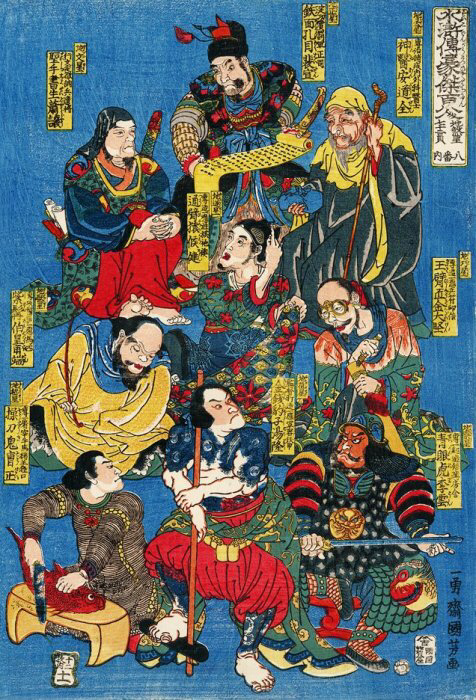
An illustration of nine of the 108 Heroes by Utagawa Kuniyoshi. Hou Jian is in the centre while the others (clockwise from the top) are Pei Xuan, An Daoquan, Jin Dajian, Li Yun, Tang Long, Cao Zheng, Huangfu Duan, and Xiao Rang.

Li Yun is a fictional character in Water Margin, one of the Classic Chinese Novels. Nicknamed "Green-eyed Tiger", he ranks 97th among the 108 Heroes and 61st among the 72 Earthly Fiends.

== Background ==
The novel describes Li Yun as a man with a broad face, thick eyebrows, a slightly reddish beard, and green eyes, which earn him the nickname "Green-eyed Tiger". First introduced in the novel as a chief constable serving in Yishui County (present-day Linyi, Shandong), he is a highly-skilled fighter who specialises in using the sabre / broadsword and is capable of taking on several opponents at the same time. He has also trained Zhu Fu in martial arts before.

== Becoming an outlaw ==
Li Yun first appears in the novel when the magistrate of Yishui County orders him to lead his men to escort the outlaw Li Kui from Liangshan Marsh back to the administrative office. Li Kui, who is still grieving over his mother's death, had let his guard down and had been tricked into consuming drinks spiked with menghanyao (蒙汗藥), causing him to feel dizzy and become unconscious.

En route, Li Kui regains consciousness and realises he is a prisoner. Luckily for him, his fellow Liangshan outlaws have sent Zhu Fu and his brother Zhu Gui to secretly keep an eye on him in case he runs into trouble. Zhu Fu, being Li Yun's apprentice, intercepts the group and pretends to offer them refreshments to congratulate his master on capturing a wanted outlaw. Li Yun and the others unsuspectingly consume the drinks, which have been spiked with menghanyao, and get knocked out. The Zhu brothers then free Li Kui, who kills all of Li Yun's men. When Li Kui is about to kill Li Yun as well, Zhu Fu stops him, saying that his master is a good man. Li Kui then leaves with the Zhu brothers.

When Li Yun comes to, he realises what has happened and goes off in pursuit of the three men. He catches up with them and fights with Li Kui, but Zhu Fu stops the fight, telling him of the Liangshan outlaws' mission to "deliver justice on Heaven's behalf". Convinced that the Liangshan cause is a righteous one and seeing that it is impossible for him to continue working in Yishui County, Li Yun grudgingly accepts his fate and joins the Liangshan outlaws.

== Campaigns and death ==
Li Yun is put in charge of supervising construction works in Liangshan after the 108 Heroes are fully assembled. He participates in the campaigns against the Liao invaders and rebel forces in Song territory after the outlaws receive amnesty from Emperor Huizong.

During the final campaign against Fang La's rebel forces, Li Yun is assigned to attack Shezhou (present-day She County, Anhui), which is guarded by Wang Yin, one of Fang La's top lieutenants. Although Li Yun manages to corner Wang Yin during the battle, he is at a significant disadvantage as he is on foot while his opponent is on horseback. He is eventually knocked down by Wang Yin and trampled to death by his horse.
