= Cao Zheng =

Fictional character in the Chinese classical novel Water Margin

- Water Margin character
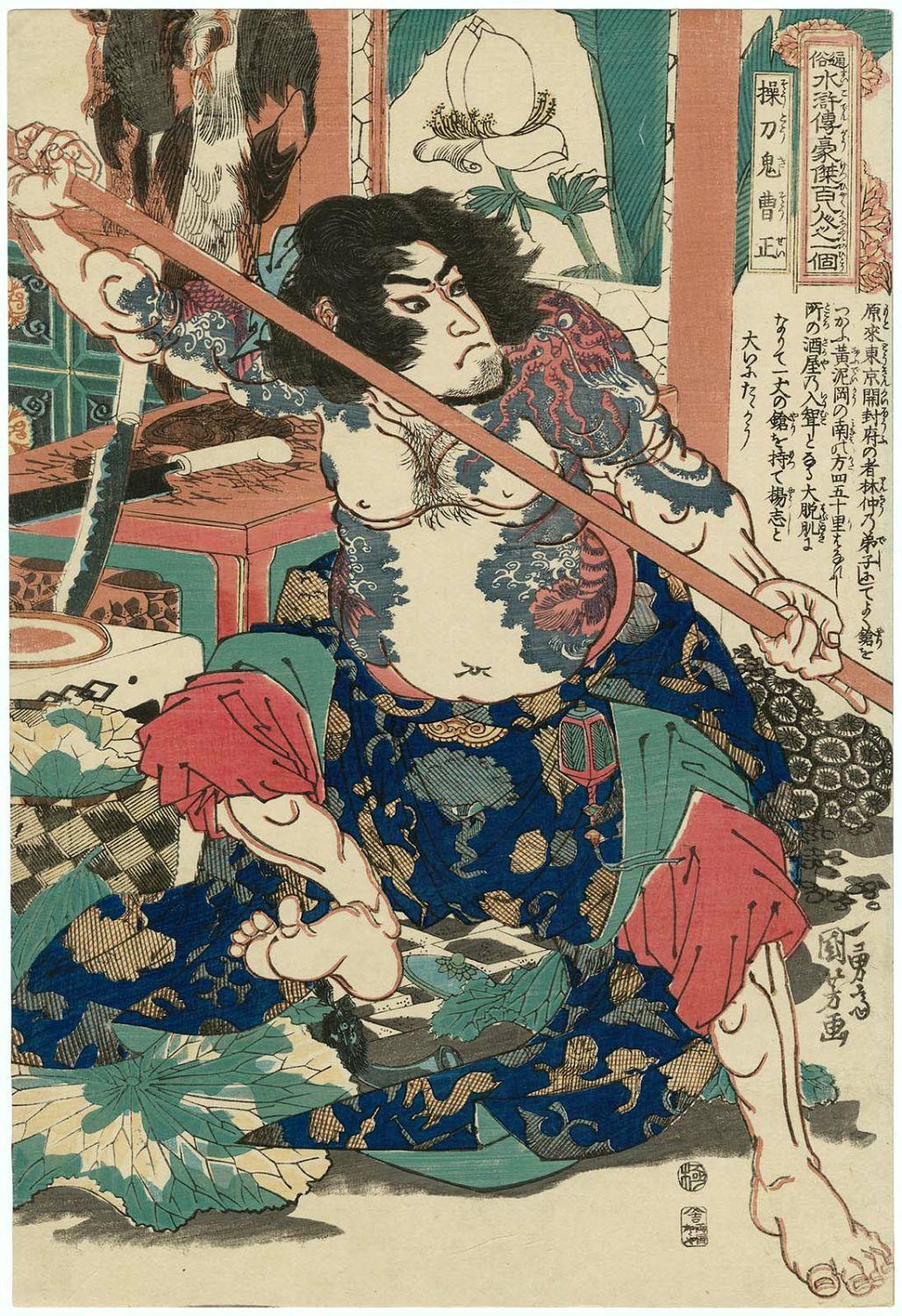
- an illustration of Cao Zheng by Utagawa Kuniyoshi
- First appearance: Chapter 17

In-universe information
- Nickname: "Knife-wielding Demon" 操刀鬼
- Origin: butcher
- Designation: Head Butcher of Liangshan
- Rank: 81st, Check Star (地稽星) of the 72 Earthly Fiends
- Ancestral home / Place of origin: Kaifeng, Henan

Chinese names
- Simplified Chinese: 曹正
- Traditional Chinese: 曹正
- Pinyin: Cáo Zhèng
- Wade–Giles: Ts'ao Cheng

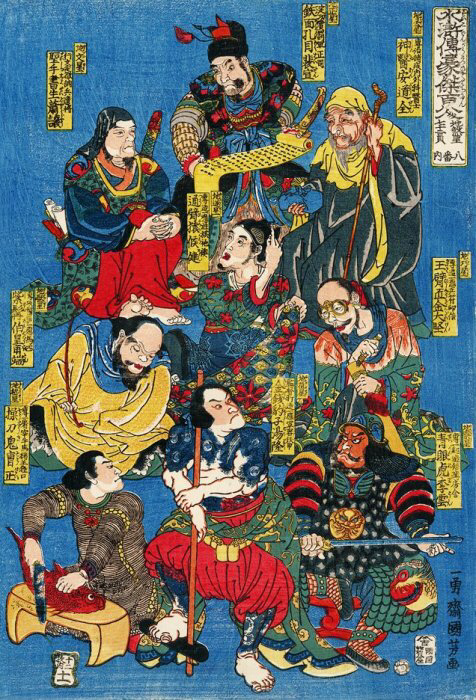
An illustration of nine of the 108 Heroes by Utagawa Kuniyoshi. Hou Jian is in the centre while the others (clockwise from the top) are Pei Xuan, An Daoquan, Jin Dajian, Li Yun, Tang Long, Cao Zheng, Huangfu Duan, and Xiao Rang.

Cao Zheng is a fictional character in Water Margin, one of the Classic Chinese Novels. Nicknamed "Knife-wielding Demon", he ranks 81st among the 108 Heroes and 45th among the 72 Earthly Fiends.

== Background ==
Originally from the capital Dongjing (東京; present-day Kaifeng, Henan), Cao Zheng is nicknamed "Knife-wielding Demon" for his slick skills as a butcher. He has also been trained in martial arts by Lin Chong when the latter was still a martial arts instructor of the imperial guards in Dongjing.

After a failed attempt at starting a business in Shandong, Cao Zheng marries a local woman and runs a tavern near Yellow Mud Ridge (黃泥崗; believed to be in present-day Yuncheng County, Shandong) with her.

== Becoming an outlaw ==
Cao Zheng is first introduced in the novel when he encounters Yang Zhi, who has just deserted his men after the convoy of valuables they were escorting have been robbed at Yellow Mud Ridge.

Penniless and feeling down, Yang Zhi has a meal at Cao Zheng's tavern and attempts to leave without paying. Cao Zheng confronts him and they fight. Sensing from Yang Zhi's fighting style that he is no ordinary person, Cao Zheng asks for his name and learns of Yang Zhi's plight.

Cao Zheng then suggests to Yang Zhi to join an outlaw band led by Deng Long at Mount Twin Dragons (二龍山) in Qingzhou, and accompanies him there. En route, they encounter Lu Zhishen, who just had a run-in with the outlaws after being denied entry to their stronghold.

Cao Zheng, Yang Zhi and Lu Zhishen then work out a plan together to trick Deng Long into letting them in. Cao Zheng and Yang Zhi pretend to have drugged and captured Lu Zhishen, and present him as their ticket to join the outlaws. Deng Long, overjoyed to see Lu Zhishen captured, orders the barricades lifted and allows the three men into the stronghold. Lu Zhishen suddenly breaks free, catches Deng Long off guard, and kills him. After that, the three men take over control of the stronghold and force Deng Long's men to pledge allegiance to them.

Cao Zheng, along with the outlaws from Mount Twin Dragons, eventually join the larger outlaw band at Liangshan Marsh after the battle of Qingzhou between government forces and the Liangshan outlaws.

== Campaigns and death ==
Cao Zheng is appointed as the head butcher at Liangshan after the 108 Heroes are fully assembled, overseeing the slaughter of pigs, cattle, and poultry. He participates in the campaigns against the Liao invaders and rebel forces in Song territory after the outlaws receive amnesty from Emperor Huizong.

During the final campaign against Fang La's rebel forces, Cao Zheng is assigned to attack Xuanzhou (宣州; present-day Xuancheng, Anhui). In the midst of battle, he is struck by a poisoned arrow and eventually dies of poisoning.
