= King Xuan =

King Xuan may refer to:

- King Xuan of Zhou (died 782 BC)
- King Xuan of Chu (died 340 BC)
- King Xuan of Qi (died 301 BC)

== See also ==
- Emperor Xuan (disambiguation)
- Duke Xuan (disambiguation)
