= Hou Jian =

Fictional character in the Chinese classical novel Water Margin

- Water Margin character
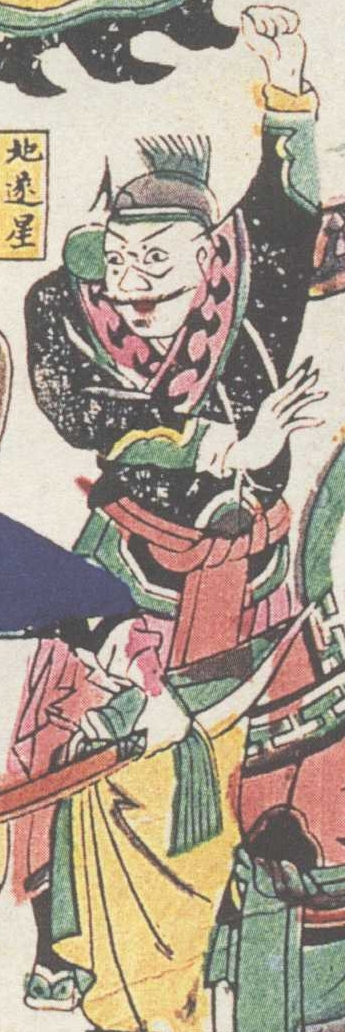
- a Qing dynasty illustration of Hou Jian
- First appearance: Chapter 41

In-universe information
- Nickname: "Interconnected-Arm Gibbon" 通臂猿
- Origin: Tailor
- Designation: Chief Tailor of Liangshan
- Rank: 71st, Succeed Star (地遂星) of the 72 Earthly Fiends
- Ancestral home / Place of origin: Hongdu (present-day Nanchang, Jiangxi)

Chinese names
- Simplified Chinese: 侯健
- Traditional Chinese: 侯健
- Pinyin: Hóu Jiàn
- Wade–Giles: Hou Chien

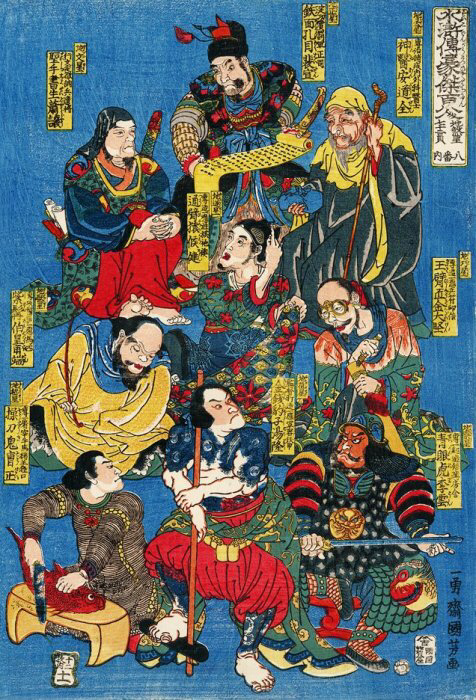
An illustration of nine of the 108 Heroes by Utagawa Kuniyoshi. Hou Jian is in the centre while the others (clockwise from the top) are Pei Xuan, An Daoquan, Jin Dajian, Li Yun, Tang Long, Cao Zheng, Huangfu Duan, and Xiao Rang.

Hou Jian is a fictional character in Water Margin, one of the Classic Chinese Novels. Nicknamed "Interconnected-Arm Gibbon", he ranks 71st among the 108 Heroes and 35th among the 72 Earthly Fiends.

== Background ==
Skinny and dexterous, Hou Jian is nicknamed "Interconnected-Arm Gibbon" for his appearance and his slick skill in needlework. He is originally from Hongdu (洪都; present-day Nanchang, Jiangxi) but has moved to Jiangzhou (江州; present-day Jiujiang, Jiangxi), where he works as a tailor in the residence of Huang Wenbing. Earlier, he has also been trained in martial arts by Xue Yong.

== Becoming an outlaw ==
Hou Jian is first introduced in the novel when his master Xue Yong recommends him to help the outlaws from Liangshan Marsh take revenge against Huang Wenbing. Huang Wenbing had reported a seditious poem written by Song Jiang, then a close ally of the outlaws, to Jiangzhou's governor Cai Jiu in the hope of ingratiating himself with the governor. At Huang Wenbing's urging, Cai Jiu sentenced Song Jiang to death, but the Liangshan outlaws showed up in full force in Jiangzhou, stormed the execution ground, and saved Song Jiang.

After getting to safety, Song Jiang seeks vengeance against Huang Wenbing, and hears of Hou Jian from Xue Yong. Xue Yong secretly contacts Hou Jian and gets him to help the Liangshan outlaws by opening the gate of the Huang residence for them. The outlaws then break into the house and kill Huang Wenbing and his family. Following this incident, Hou Jian agrees to join the outlaws and follow them back to the stronghold at Liangshan Marsh.

== Campaigns and death ==
Hou Jian is appointed as Liangshan's chief tailor after the 108 Heroes are fully assembled, overseeing the making of clothes, flags, banners, etc. for the outlaws. He participates in the campaigns against the Liao invaders and rebel forces in Song territory after the outlaws receive amnesty from Emperor Huizong.

During the final campaign against Fang La's rebel forces, Hou Jian joins Liangshan marines in launching a flank assault on Hangzhou via a waterway. However, they encounter a storm and his boat is swept out into the open sea. A non-swimmer, Hou Jian ultimately drowns when his boat capsizes.
