= Interconnected-arm gibbon =

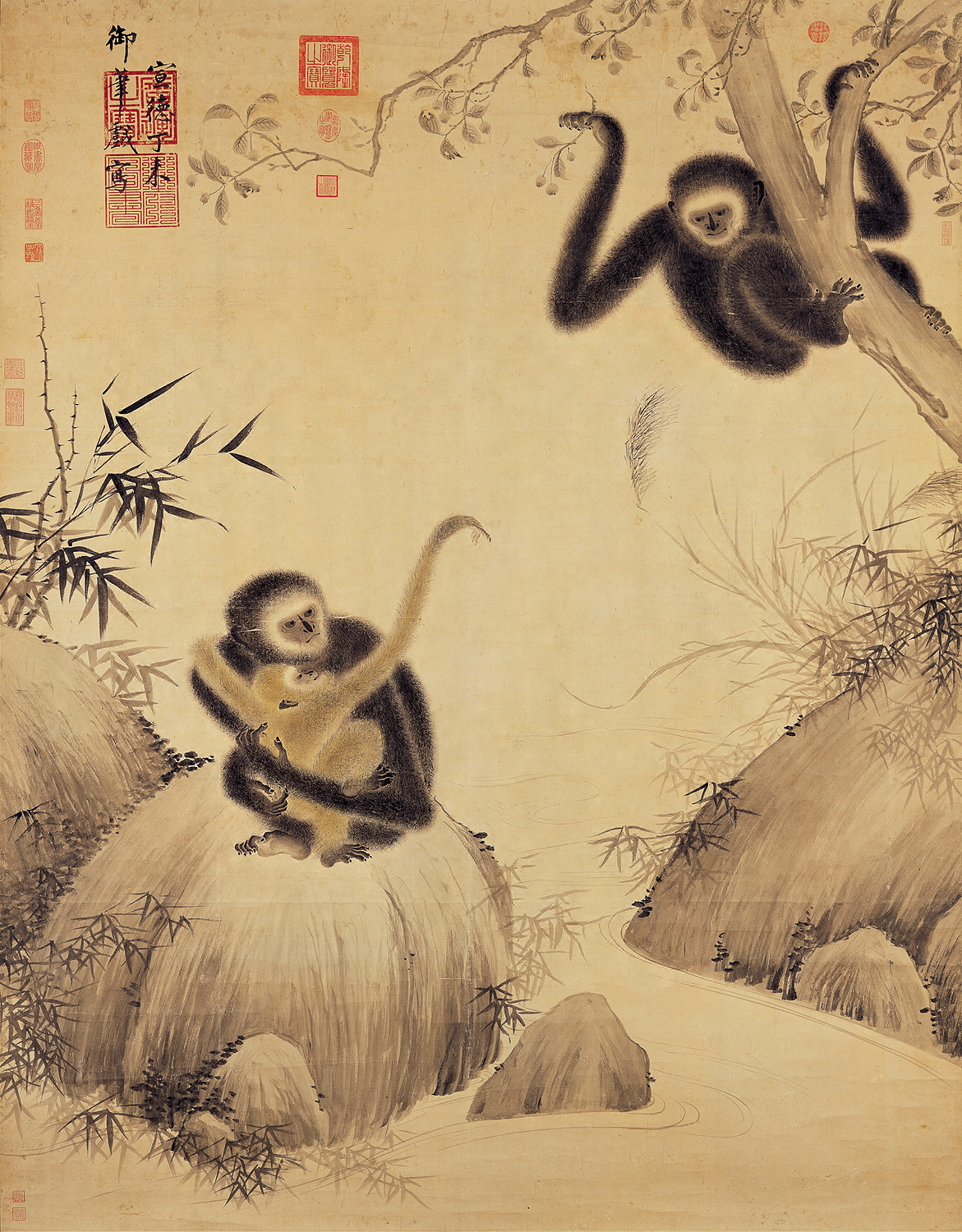
"Gibbons at Play" (戲猿圖), a 1427 painting by the Xuande Emperor, now in the collection of the National Palace Museum.

In Chinese folklore, the interconnected-arm gibbon (Chinese: 通臂猿 or 通臂猿猴) is a gibbon whose long arms are interconnected at the shoulders. As a result, it can lengthen one arm considerably by pulling in the other. According to Robert van Gulik, this myth "must have been caused by the truly incredible speed with which a gibbon reaches out with one arm while keeping the other close to its body."

== Description ==
In the 16th century, Li Shizhen (1518–1593) in his Bencao gangmu (Compendium of Materia Medica) debunked the myth that gibbons have interconnected arms. Nevertheless, the popular belief persisted. For example, Zhao Yi (1727–1814) once wrote about a black gibbon he had received:

[...] which I had put on a leash attached to a pillar (in my office). An office-attendant teased it, keeping at a distance of seven or eight feet. Suddenly the gibbon lengthened his right arm and grabbed the man's robe, nearly tearing it. At that time there was no arm on the gibbon's left shoulder. From this it can be known that the left arm had served to lengthen the right, and thus this was what is called a gibbon with interconnecting arms. This gibbon was therefore never petted by people.

== In novels ==
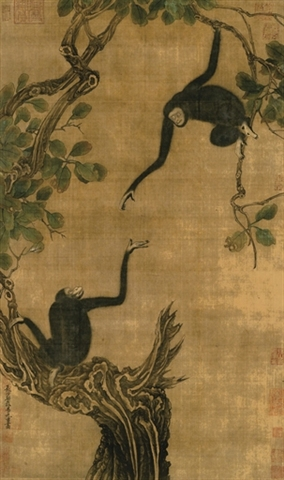
"Oak Leaves and Two Gibbons" (槲葉雙猿圖), an 11th-century painting by Yi Yuanji.

=== Journey to the West ===
In the 16th-century fantasy novel Journey to the West, the Buddha in a speech reveals that there are four spiritual primates who do not belong to any of the ten categories that all beings in the universe are classified under: the Intelligent Stone Monkey (靈明石猴), the Red-Buttock Baboon (赤尻馬猴), the Interconnected-Arm Gibbon, and the Six-Eared Macaque. The Interconnected-Arm Gibbon can "catch the sun or moon, shrink mountains, see what is auspicious and what is not, and fool around with heaven and earth."

The term does not appear anywhere else in the novel, although there are two older "interconnected-back gibbons" (通背猿猴) who in the novel's early chapters serve diligently under the Monkey King at the Flower-Fruit Mountain as generals Beng (崩) and Ba (芭). One of them is highly knowledgeable and he is the one that directs the Monkey King to begin his immortality-seeking journey. Since their peers are two red-buttock baboons (who are made Marshals Ma (馬) and Liu (流)), and also because the words "interconnected-arm" (tongbi) and "interconnected-back" (tongbei) are near-homonyms, it would appear that the Monkey King is the Intelligent Stone Monkey and Beng and Ba are the interconnected-arm gibbons. However, this interpretation is controversial, as Beng, Ba, Ma, and Liu—who lose basically every battle without the Monkey King—are too incompetent to be rated so highly by the Buddha.

In the 17th-century sequel The Later Journey to the West (後西遊記) by an anonymous author, one of the gibbons formerly under the Monkey King becomes the Interconnected-Arm Immortal (通臂仙).

=== Quashing the Demons' Revolt ===
Quashing the Demons' Revolt (also translated as The Sorcerers' Revolt) is a 17th-century fantasy novel compiled by Feng Menglong who added twenty chapters to an older, twenty-chapter novel attributed to Luo Guanzhong, The Three Sui Quash the Demons' Revolt. A large part of Feng's new chapters follows Yuan Gong (袁公; Mr. Yuan—Yuan being a homonym for "gibbon"), a white interconnected-arm gibbon not only exceptionally nimble and skilled in martial arts, but also versed in Taoism and apparently immortal. The novel begins with two well-known gibbon tales, from Spring and Autumn Annals of Master Lü (4th century BC) and Spring and Autumn Annals of Wu and Yue (1st century) respectively, except Feng combined them onto the same character: Yuan Gong catches 18 arrows shot at him by King Gong of Chu (died 560 BC) before escaping from the legendary archer Yang Youji, then reappears about a century later to challenge the swordswoman Yuenü (whose real identity is Xuannü in the novel). Later, Xuannü takes him to Heaven where he becomes responsible for heavenly books that he is forbidden to browse. One day, overcome by curiosity, he opens a secret box and brings Heaven's Teachings to earth, leading to a series of disasters that culminate in Wang Ze's rebellion in the 1040s. Eventually Yuan Gong redeems himself and for his role in quashing the revolt, he is restored to his former position of Lord of White Cloud Cave (白雲洞君).

=== Other novels ===
Hou Jian, a fictional Mount Liang hero from Shi Nai'an's Water Margin, is nicknamed "Interconnected-Arm Gibbon". Many human characters from subsequent novels have also been given this nickname, including:

- Suo Xian (索賢) from Forgotten Stories from the History of Sui (隋史遺文, 17th century) by Yuan Yuling
- Yuan Xi (袁喜) from Romance of Shi Zhu After the Three Kingdoms (後三國石珠演義, 1740)
- Han Tong (908–960) from the historical novel The Complete Tale of the Flying Dragon (飛龍全傳, 1768) by Wu Xuan
- Yao Suo (姚鎖) from The Five Younger Gallants (1890)
- Liu Qing (劉青) from Cases of Judge Peng (彭公案, 1892) by Yang Yidian
- Yuan Xing (袁興) from The Tale of Everlasting Blessings and Peace, Part 2 (永慶昇平後傳, 1894) also by Yang Yidian

Han Tong is even said to be the founder of tongbiquan ("interconnected-arm boxing"), or tongbeiquan, a school of Chinese martial arts.
