= Emperor Yuan =

Emperor Yuan may refer to:

== Posthumous name ==
- Emperor Yuan of Han (75–33 BC; reigned 48–33 BC)
- Emperor Yuan of Cao Wei (245–302; reigned 260–266)
- Emperor Yuan of Jin (276–323; reigned 318–323)
- Emperor Yuan of Liang (508–555; reigned 552–555)

== Others ==
- Yuan Shu (died 199), self-declared emperor in 197–199
- Yuan Shikai (1859–1916), self-declared emperor in 1915–1916

== See also ==
- Yuanzong (disambiguation)
- King Yuan of Zhou (reigned 476–469 BC)
- Northern Wei (386–535), whose emperors used the surname Yuan after 496
  - Eastern Wei (534–550), whose only emperor used the surname Yuan
  - Western Wei (535–557), whose emperors used the surname Yuan until 554
- List of emperors of the Yuan dynasty
- List of Northern Yuan khans
