= Prince of Jingjiang =

Princely peerage

Prince of Jingjiang 靖江王
- Creation date: 1370
- Created by: Hongwu Emperor
- Peerage: Special princely peerage for imperial clansman of Ming Dynasty
- First holder: Zhu Shouqian
- Last holder: Zhu Rensheng, Prince Xianding
- Status: Extinct
- Extinction date: 1650
- Seat: Guilin

Prince of Jingjiang (靖江王) was a princely peerage created and used during the Ming dynasty. It was the tenth princely peerage created by the Hongwu Emperor; his grandnephew Zhu Shouqian was the first to be enfeoffed as Prince of Jingjiang. The Princedom of Jingjiang was distinct from other princely peerages in that the princely title contained two Chinese characters, common to second-rank princedoms but not first-rank princedoms. Nevertheless, the Prince of Jingjiang was still a first-rank princely peerage. The heir apparent to the Princedom of Jingjiang was styled Hereditary Prince, but the titles for other non-inheriting male members of the line was bulwark general or supporter general while female members were styled county lady or village lady, not commandery prince/princess as was common with other first-rank peerages.

Shitao, a Chinese landscape painter in the early part of the Qing Dynasty, was descended from the Princes of Jingjiang.

== Generation poems ==
The generation poem given by Hongwu Emperor was:

Zan Zuo Xiang Gui Yue, Jing Bang Ren Lü Heng. Ruo Yi Chun Yi Xing, Yuan De Xi Fang Ming
贊佐相規約，經邦任履亨。若依純一行，遠得襲芳名。

The royal descendants of this peerage did not need to follow the Wu Xing naming rule which was followed by the rest of the Hongwu Emperor's sons. This poem was used until the Heng and Ruo generation during the Ming dynasty. The surviving descendants completed the cycle of this poem during Jiaqing Emperor's era, and they later created another poem to name themselves:

Ji Zhi Yi Cong Ben, Dun Xiu Shang Gui Xian. Zhen Jia Zhao Guang Sheng, Bao Shan Nai Chang Yan.
繼志宜從本，敦修尚貴賢。振家招廣盛，寶善乃長延。

== Members ==
=== Main line ===
- Zhu Shouqian (朱守謙; 1361 – Jan 1392) (1st), the grandnephew of Hongwu Emperor. His grandfather, Zhu Xinglong (朱興隆) was eldest brother of Hongwu Emperor. His father, Zhu Wenzheng (朱文正) involved the established of Ming dynasty. He granted the title of Prince of Jingjiang by Hongwu Emperor, from 1370 to 1380 and took his fief in 1376.. He was demoted by Hongwu Emperor in 1380 and restored the title in 1387. The emperor later demoted him again and house arrested him at Nanjing. He had no posthumous name.
  - 1st son: Zhu Zanyi (朱贊儀; 1382 – 1408) (2nd), Hongwu Emperor designated him as his father's hereditary prince (heir apparent) after his father died. He succeeded the title of Prince of Jingjiang in 1400. The emperor ordered him to visit other princes and return to the capital. He went back to his fief in 1403 and held the title until 1489, due to Jingnan Campaign. Full posthumous name: Prince Daoxi of Jingjiang (靖江悼僖王)
    - 1st son: Zhu Zuojing (朱佐敬; 1404 – 1469) (3rd), he succeeded the title of Prince of Jingjiang from 1411 – 1469. Full posthumous name: Prince Zhuangjian of Jingjiang (靖江莊簡王)
      - 1st son: Zhu Xiangcheng (朱相承; died 1458), he died before his father. He was posthumously honoured as Prince of Jingjiang under the full posthumous name Prince Huaishun of Jingjiang (靖江懷順王) in 1471.
        - 1st son: Zhu Guiyu (朱規裕; 1453 – 1489) (4th), he succeeded the title of Prince of Jingjiang from 1471 to 1489 after his grandfather died. Full posthumous name: Prince Zhaohe of Jingjiang (靖江昭和王)
          - 1st son: Zhu Yueqi (朱約麒; 1475 – 1516) (5th), he succeeded the title of Prince of Jingjiang from 1490 to 1516. Full posthumous name: Prince Duanyi of Jingjiang (靖江端懿王)
            - 1st son: Zhu Jingfu (朱經扶; 1493 – 1525) (6th), he succeeded the title of Prince of Jingjiang from 1518 to 1525. Full posthumous name: Prince Ansu of Jingjiang (靖江安肅王)
              - 1st son: Zhu Bangning (朱邦薴; 1513 – 1572) (7th), he succeeded the title of Prince of Jingjiang from 1527 to 1572. Full posthumous name: Prince Gonghui of Jingjiang (靖江恭惠王)
                - 1st son: Zhu Renchang (朱任昌; 1532 – 1582) (8th) he succeeded the title of Prince of Jingjiang from 1575 to 1582. Full posthumous name: Prince Kangxi of Jingjiang (靖江康僖王)
                  - Zhu Lüdao (朱履燾; 1572 – 1590) (9th), he succeeded the title of Prince of Jingjiang from 1585 to 1590. He had not child. Full posthumous name: Prince Wenyu of Jingjiang (靖江溫裕王)
                - 2nd son: Zhu Rensheng (朱任晟; 1538 – 1609) (10th), he initially held the title of a bulwark general from 1552 to 1590. He succeeded the title of Prince of Jingjiang from 1592 to 1609. Full posthumous name: Prince Xianding of Jingjiang (靖江憲定王)
                  - 1st son: Zhu Lüxiang (朱履祥; 1556 – 1596), initially held the title of a bulwark general. He later designated as his father's hereditary prince but died before his father.
                    - Zhu Hengyin (朱亨歅; 1595 – 1650) (13th), he succeeded the title of Prince of Jingjiang from 1646 – 1650. He had resisted the Qing Dynasty, but later collapsed and got killed by Kong Youde in 1650. He had not posthumous name.
                      - Zhu Ruochun (朱若椿), designated as hereditary prince.
                  - 2nd son: Zhu Lühu (朱履祜; 1568 – 1635) (10th), he succeeded the title of Prince of Jingjiang from 1612 to 1635. Full posthumous name: Prince Rongmu of Jingjiang (靖江荣穆王)
                    - Zhu Hengjia (朱亨嘉; 1583 – 1646) (11th), he succeeded the title of Prince of Jingjiang from 1638 to 1646. He proclaimed himself as regent during Longwu Emperor's reign and killed by him. He had not posthumous name.
                      - Zhu Ruoji (朱若極) / Shitao (1642–1707), designated as hereditary prince.

=== Lesser members ===
- Zhu Shouqian, 1st prince
  - Zhu Zanyi, Prince Daoxi (2nd)
    - Zhu Zuojing, Prince Zhuangjian (3rd)
      - Zhu Xiangcheng, "Prince Huaishun"
        - Zhu Guiyu, Prince Zhaohe (4th)
          - Zhu Yueqi, Prince Duanyi (5th)
            - Zhu Jingfu, Prince Ansu (6th)
              - Zhu Bangning, Prince Gonghui (7th)
                - Zhu Rensheng, Prince Xianding (10th)
                  - 2nd, 3rd & 4th daughter: Village Lady Lujiang (廬江鄉君), Village Lady Jinhe (金河鄉君) and Village Lady Yongxin (永新鄉君)
              - 5 unknown sons
          - 2nd, 3rd, 4th, 5th, 6th son: Zhu Yueling (朱約麟), Zhu Yuepao (朱約麅), Zhu Yuezhu (朱約麆), Zhu Yueshe (朱約麝) & Zhu Yuechen (朱約塵), both of them held the title of asupporter general.
        - 2nd & 3rd son: Zhu Guiduan (朱規端) & Zhu Guixie (朱規祄), both of them held the title of a supporter general.
      - 2nd to 19th son: Zhu Fayuan (朱法源), Zhu Xiangji (朱相繼), Zhu Xiangshao (朱相紹), Zhu Xiangchun (朱相純), Zhu Xianglun (朱相綸), Zhu Xiangying (朱相纓), Zhu Xiangqi (朱相玘), Zhu Xianggong (朱相珙), Zhu Xiangxuan (朱相瑄), Zhu Xiangqi (朱相琪), Zhu Xiangcong (朱相璁), Zhu Xiangwei (朱相緯), Zhu Xiangfu (朱相紱), Zhu Xianglian (朱相練), Zhu Xiangjin (朱相縉), Zhu Xiangshen (朱相紳), Zhu Xiangshou (朱相綬) & Zhu Xiangtong (朱相統), both of them held the title of a supporter general.
    - 2nd son: Zhu Zuomin (朱佐敏), held the title of a supporter general.
    - 2 daughters: County Lady Gongcheng (恭城縣君) and County Lady Xuanhua (宣化縣君)
  - 2nd, 3rd, 4th, 5th, 6th, 7th, 8th, & 9th son: Zhu Zanyan (朱贊儼), Zhu Zankai (朱贊侃), Zhu Zanjun (朱贊俊), Zhu Zanxie (朱贊偕), Zhu Zanlun (朱贊倫), Zhu Zanjie (朱贊傑), Zhu Zanchu (朱贊儲) & Zhu Zanyi (朱贊億), both of them held the title of a bulwark general.

== Family tree ==
Legend:
– Actual princes

– Posthumously princes

– Hereditary prince (Heir apparent)

– The emperor who created this peerage

Zhu Shizhen 朱世珍; Emperor Renzu Chun 仁祖淳皇帝 (posthumously honoured)
1	4
Zhu Xinglong 朱興隆 d. 1344; Prince of Nanchang 南昌王 (title posthumously)	Hongwu Emperor
2
Zhu Wenzheng 朱文正 d. 1365
Zhu Shouqian 朱守謙; 1361 – 1392; Prince of Jingjiang ^{1} 靖江王; 1370 – 1380, 1387 (title stripped)
1
Zhu Zanyi 朱贊儀; 1382 – 1408; Prince Daoxi of Jingjiang ^{2} 靖江悼僖王; 1400, 1403 – 1489
1
Zhu Zuojing 朱佐敬; 1404 – 1469; Prince Zhuangjian of Jingjiang ^{3} 靖江莊簡王; 1411 – 1469
1
Zhu Xiangcheng 朱相承 d. 1458; Prince Huaishun of Jingjiang 靖江懷順王 (title posthumously)
1
Zhu Guiyu 朱規裕; 1453 – 1489; Prince Zhaohe of Jingjiang ^{4} 靖江昭和王; 1471 – 1489
1
Zhu Yueqi 朱約麒; 1490 – 1516; Prince Duanyi of Jingjiang ^{5} 靖江端懿王; 1490 – 1516
1
Zhu Jingfu 朱經扶; 1493 – 1525; Prince Ansu of Jingjiang ^{6} 靖江安肅王; 1518 – 1525
Zhu Bangning 朱邦薴; 1513 – 1572; Prince Gonghui of Jingjiang ^{7} 靖江恭惠王; 1527 – 1572
1	2
Zhu Renchang 朱任昌; 1532 – 1582; Prince Kangxi of Jingjiang ^{8} 靖江康僖王; 1575 – 1582	Zhu Rensheng 朱任晟; 1538 – 1609; Prince Xianding of Jingjiang ^{10} 靖江憲定王; 1592 – 1609
1	1	2
Zhu Lüdao 朱履燾; 1572 – 1590; Prince Wengyu of Jingjiang ^{9} 靖江溫裕王; 1585 – 1590	Zhu Lüxiang 朱履祥; 1556 – 1596; Hereditary Prince of Jingjiang 靖江世子	Zhu Lühu 朱履祜; 1568 – 1635; Prince Rongmu of Jingjiang ^{11} 靖江荣穆王; 1612 – 1635
Zhu Hengyin 朱亨歅; 1595 – 1650; Prince of Jingjiang ^{13} 靖江王; 1646 – 1650	Zhu Hengjia 朱亨嘉; 1538 – 1646; Prince of Jingjiang ^{12} 靖江王; 1638 – 1646
Zhu Ruochun 朱若椿; Hereditary Prince of Jingjiang 靖江世子	Zhu Ruoji 朱若極; 1642 – 1707; Hereditary Prince of Jingjiang 靖江世子
