= Huangfu Duan =

Fictional character in the Chinese classical novel Water Margin

- Water Margin character
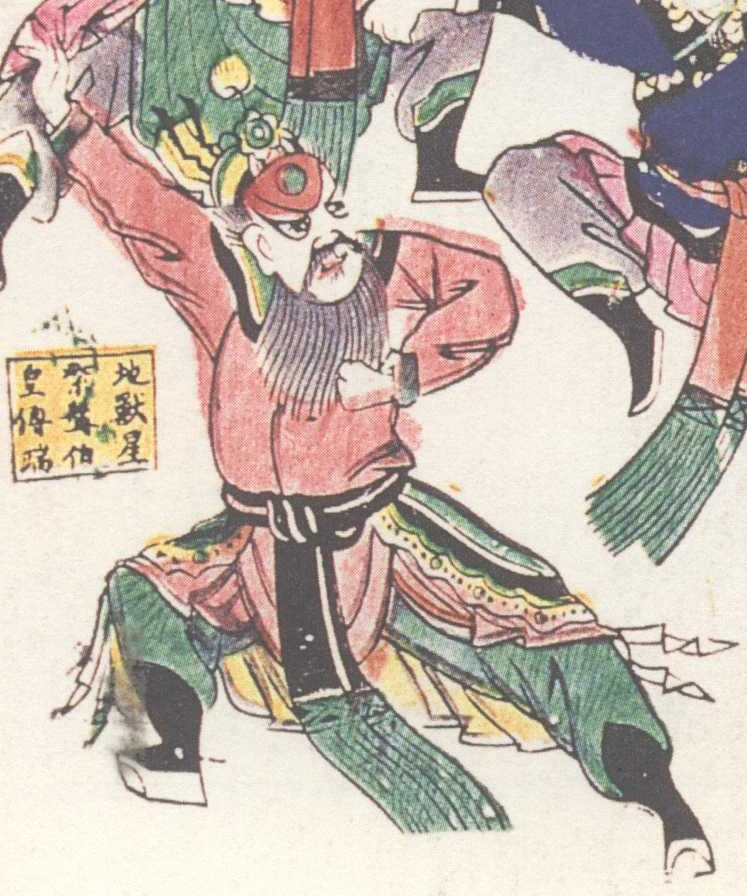
- a Qing dynasty illustration of Huangfu Duan
- First appearance: Chapter 70

In-universe information
- Nickname: "Purple-bearded Count" 紫髯伯
- Origin: veterinarian
- Designation: Veterinarian of Liangshan
- Rank: 57th, Beast Star (地獸星) of the 72 Earthly Fiends
- Ancestral home / Place of origin: Youzhou (around present-day Beijing)

Chinese names
- Simplified Chinese: 皇甫端
- Traditional Chinese: 皇甫端
- Pinyin: Huángfǔ Duān
- Wade–Giles: Huang-fu Tuan

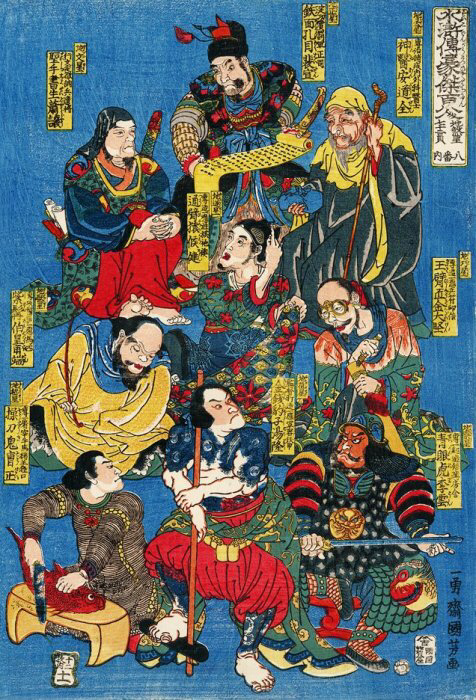
An illustration of nine of the 108 Heroes by Utagawa Kuniyoshi. Hou Jian is in the centre while the others (clockwise from the top) are Pei Xuan, An Daoquan, Jin Dajian, Li Yun, Tang Long, Cao Zheng, Huangfu Duan, and Xiao Rang.

Huangfu Duan is a fictional character in Water Margin, one of the Classic Chinese Novels. Nicknamed "Purple Bearded Count", he ranks 57th among the 108 Heroes and 21st among the 72 Earthly Fiends.

== Background ==
The novel describes Huangfu Duan as a man with green eyes and a long yellow beard, which earn him the nickname "Purple-bearded Count". Originally from Youzhou (幽州; around present-day Beijing), he is known for his skill as a veterinarian, especially in diagnosing and treating equine diseases.

== Becoming an outlaw ==
Huangfu Duan is the last of the 108 Heroes to make his appearance in Water Margin. He is recommended to the outlaw band at Liangshan Marsh by Zhang Qing, a military officer from Dongchang Prefecture (東昌府; present-day Liaocheng, Shandong), after Zhang Qing joins the outlaws. Huangfu Duan accepts the invitation and becomes the last of the 108 Heroes to join Liangshan.

== Campaigns ==
Huangfu Duan is appointed as the veterinarian in charge of Liangshan's livestock, particularly horses, after the 108 Heroes are fully assembled. He participates in the campaigns against the Liao invaders and rebel forces in Song territory after the outlaws receive amnesty from Emperor Huizong.

Before the final campaign against Fang La's rebel forces, the emperor summons Huangfu Duan to the capital and appoints him an imperial veterinarian. Huangfu Duan then remains serving in that position for the rest of his life.
