= Wonjong (disambiguation) =

Wonjong of Goryeo (1219–1274) was the 24th king of Goryeo.

Wonjong can also refer to:

- Prince Jeongwon, also known by his temple name, Wonjong of Joseon.
- Bak Wonjong (1467-1510), Yeonguijeong under King Jungjong of Joseon.
- Lee Won-jong (born 1966), South Korean actor.

== See also ==
- Yuanzong (disambiguation) (Chinese equivalent)
