= Xuan (given name) =

Xuan is a unisex given name.

In Asturian and Galician, Xuan is a masculine given name and the Asturian cognate of Johannes.

== In Chinese or Vietnamese language ==
- Ai Xuan (born 1947), Chinese painter
- An Xuan (2nd century), Parthian translator
- Eoon Qi Xuan (born 2000), Malaysian badminton player
- Fu Xuan (217–278), Chinese poet
- Ge Xuan (164–244), Chinese Taoist
- Han Xuan (151–210), Chinese governor
- Hou Xuan (3rd century), Chinese military officer
- Huan Xuan (369–404), Chinese emperor
- Jin Xuan (died 209), Chinese personage of the Three Kingdoms
- Liu Xuan (emperor) (died 25), Chinese emperor of the Han Dynasty
- Liu Xuan (gymnast) (born 1979), Chinese artistic gymnast
- Liu Xuan (Three Kingdoms) (died 264), Chinese imperial prince
- Pei Xuan, a Water Margin character
- Qian Xuan (1235–1305), Chinese painter
- Qiao Xuan (108–183), Chinese general
- Wang Xuan (1937–2006), Chinese scientist
- Wang Xuan (Second Zhou) (7th century), Chinese chancellor
- Xiahou Xuan (209–254), Chinese politician
- Xie Xuan (343–388), Chinese general
- Xuân Thủy (c. 1912–85), North Vietnamese political figure
- Zhang Xuan (713–755), Chinese painter
- Zheng Xuan (127-200), Chinese philosopher
- Zhou Xuan (1918–57), Chinese singer

== In Asturian language ==
- Xuan Bello (1965–2025), Spanish poet, writer, essayist, and translator
