= Xuanzong =

Xuanzong (Hsüan-tsung in Wade–Giles) may refer to the following Chinese emperors:

- Emperor Xuanzong of Tang (reigned 713–756)
- Emperor Xuanzong of Tang (9th century) (reigned 846–859)
- Emperor Xuanzong of Jin (reigned 1213–1224)
- Emperor Xuanzong of Ming, or Xuande Emperor (reigned 1425–35)
- Emperor Xuanzong of Qing, or Daoguang Emperor (reigned 1820–50)

== See also ==
- Emperor Xuan (disambiguation)
