= Hwan =

Hwan can refer to:

- South Korean hwan, a defunct currency
- Hwan-guk, a pseudohistorical Korean 'nation'
- Hwan (name), Korean surname and Korean given name

== See also ==
- Huan (disambiguation)
