= Duke Huan =

Duke Huan may refer to these rulers from ancient China:

- Duke Huan of Zheng (died 771 BC)
- Duke Huan of Wey (died 719 BC)
- Duke Huan of Chen (died 707 BC)
- Duke Huan of Lu (died 694 BC)
- Duke Huan of Qi (died 643 BC)
- Duke Huan of Qin (died 577 BC)
- Duke Huan of Jin (died 369 BC?)
- Duke Huan of Tian Qi (400–357 BC)

== See also ==
- King Huan of Zhou (died 697 BC)
- Marquis Huan of Cai (died 695 BC)
- Emperor Huan of Han (132–168)
