= Emperor Xuan =

Emperor Xuan is the name of:

- Xuandi (god) from Chinese mythology

== Chinese people ==
- Emperor Xuan of Han (91–48 BC, reigned 74–48 BC)
- Sima Yi (179–251), Cao Wei statesman, general, and regent who was posthumously honored as Emperor Xuan of Jin
- Emperor Xuan of Western Liang (519–562, reigned 555–562)
- Emperor Xuan of Chen (530–582, reigned 569–582)
- Emperor Xuan of Northern Zhou (559–580, reigned 578–579)
- Yang Longyan (897–920, reigned 910–920), ruler of Yang Wu who was posthumously honored as Emperor Xuan of Yang Wu
- Taksi (1543–1583), Jurchen chieftain who was posthumously honored as Emperor Xuan of Qing

== See also ==
- King Xuan (disambiguation)
- Emperor Xuanzong (disambiguation)
