= When =

When may refer to:

== Broadcast stations ==
- WHEN (AM), an Urban Adult Contemporary radio station in Syracuse, New York
- WHEN-FM, the former call letters of radio station WWHT in Syracuse, New York
- WHEN-TV, the former call letters of TV station WTVH in Syracuse, New York

== Music ==
- When (band), a musical project of Norwegian artist Lars Pedersen
- When! Records, a UK record label whose artists include Rob Overseer

=== Albums ===
- When (album), by Vincent Gallo, or the title song, 2001

=== Songs ===
- "When" (The Kalin Twins song), 1958
- "When" (Red Vincent Hurley song), the Irish entry for Eurovision 1976
- "When" (Shania Twain song), 1998
- "When", by Amanda Lear from Diamonds for Breakfast, 1980
- "When", by Dodie from Intertwined, 2016
- "When", by Kirk Franklin from Losing My Religion, 2015
- "When", by Megadeth from The World Needs a Hero, 2001
- "When… ?", a 2007 song by Moka Only from Vermilion
- "When", by Opeth from My Arms, Your Hearse, 1998
- "When", by Perry Como, 1980
- "When", by Rostam from Half-Light, 2017
- "When?", by Spirit from Spirit of '76, 1975
- "When", by Taproot from Welcome, 2002

== Other uses ==
- When?, one of the Five Ws, questions used in journalism
