= An Daoquan =

Fictional character in the Chinese classical novel Water Margin

- Water Margin character
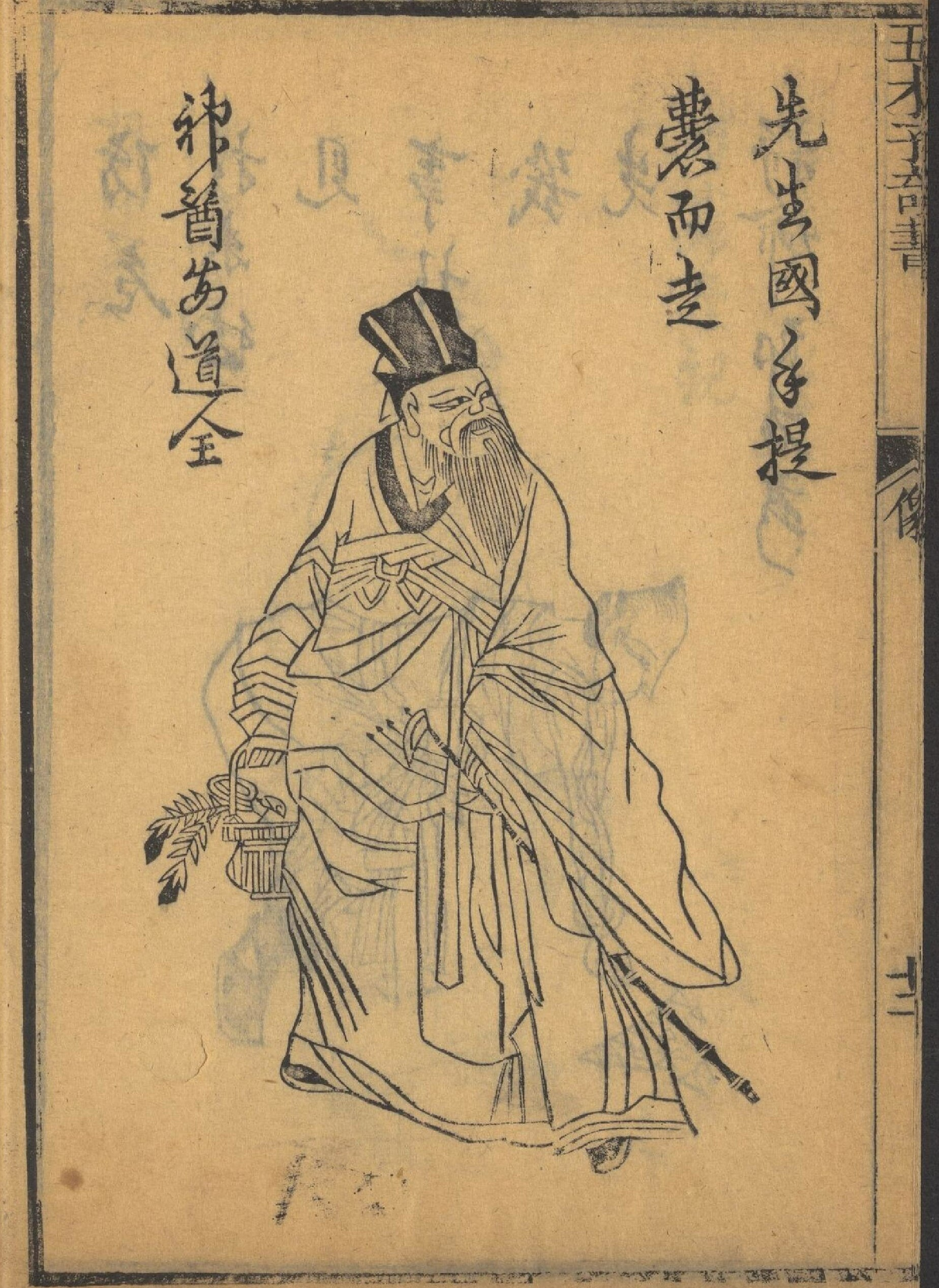
- a Qing dynasty illustration of An Daoquan
- First appearance: Chapter 65

In-universe information
- Nickname: "Divine Physician" 神醫
- Origin: physician
- Designation: Physician of Liangshan
- Rank: 56th, Efficacious Star (地靈星) of the 72 Earthly Fiends
- Ancestral home / Place of origin: Jiankang Prefecture (present-day Nanjing, Jiangsu)

Chinese names
- Simplified Chinese: 安道全
- Traditional Chinese: 安道全
- Pinyin: Ān Dàoquán
- Wade–Giles: An Tao-ch'üan

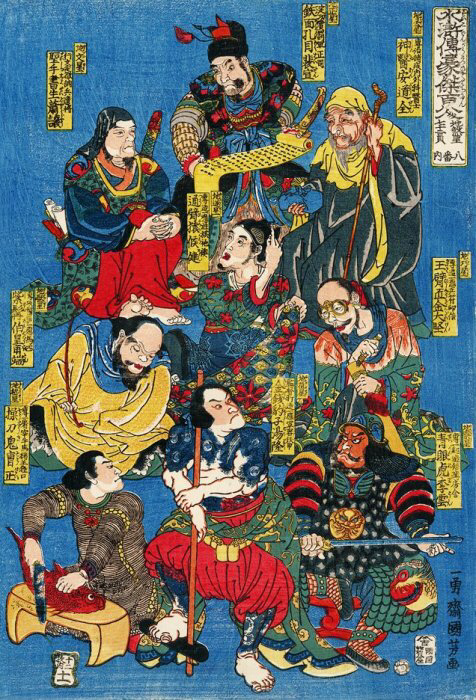
An illustration of nine of the 108 Heroes by Utagawa Kuniyoshi. Hou Jian is in the centre while the others (clockwise from the top) are Pei Xuan, An Daoquan, Jin Dajian, Li Yun, Tang Long, Cao Zheng, Huangfu Duan, and Xiao Rang.

An Daoquan is a fictional character in Water Margin, one of the Classic Chinese Novels. Nicknamed "Divine Physician", he ranks 56th among the 108 Heroes and 20th among the 72 Earthly Fiends.

== Background ==
Nicknamed "Divine Physician" for his exceptional medical skills, An Daoquan is from Jiankang Prefecture (建康府; present-day Nanjing, Jiangsu). As he is known for his ability to treat and cure rare illnesses, he has been likened to famous historical physicians such as Bian Que and Hua Tuo.

== Becoming an outlaw ==
An Daoquan is first introduced in the novel when Zhang Shun recommends him to heal Song Jiang, the eventual chief of the outlaw band at Liangshan Marsh, of a life-threatening illness. Song Jiang has fallen sick due to a tumour on his back, and has gotten a high fever which does not subside, resulting in him becoming delirious. His condition has been deteriorating and no medicine seems to be able to heal him.

Zhang Shun remembers that his mother once suffered from a similar illness and was healed by An Daoquan, so he volunteers to go to Jiankang Prefecture to find An Daoquan and take him to Liangshan.

In Jiankang Prefecture, Zhang Shun locates An Daoquan, who is unwilling to leave because of Li Qiaonu, a prostitute he is infatuated with. In desperation, Zhang Shun kills Li Qiaonu, and frames An Daoquan for the murder. He writes in blood "An Daoquan is the killer" on a wall at the crime scene, scaring the physician into fleeing Jiankang Prefecture with him.

After that, An Daoquan reluctantly joins the Liangshan outlaws and successfully heals Song Jiang.

== Campaigns ==
An Daoquan is appointed as Liangshan's resident physician after the 108 Heroes are fully assembled. He participates in the campaigns against the Liao invaders and rebel forces in Song territory after the outlaws receive amnesty from Emperor Huizong.

During the final campaign against Fang La's rebel forces, the emperor summons An Daoquan to the capital Dongjing (東京; present-day Kaifeng, Henan) to cure a minor ailment he has. As a result, An Daoquan does not participate in the battle of Hangzhou and the subsequent ones in the campaign. Since then, he has remained in the capital to serve as an imperial physician.
