= Zhu Shouqian =

Chinese prince (1361–1392)

Zhu Shouqian 朱守謙
- Prince of Jingjiang
- Born: Zhu Tiezhu (朱鐵柱); 1361
- Died: 1392 (aged 30–31)
- Burial: Purple Mountain, Nanjing
Names
- Zhu Wei (朱煒), later Zhu Shouqian
- House: Zhu
- Father: Zhu Wenzheng

Chinese name
- Traditional Chinese: 朱守謙
- Simplified Chinese: 朱守谦
Transcriptions
Standard Mandarin
- Hanyu Pinyin: Zhū Shǒuqiān
- Wade–Giles: Chu Shou-ch'ien

Zhu Shouqian (simplified Chinese: 朱守谦; traditional Chinese: 朱守謙; pinyin: Zhū Shǒuqiān; Wade–Giles: Chu Shou-ch'ien; 1361–1392), the Prince of Jingjiang, was the grandnephew of Zhu Yuanzhang (the Hongwu Emperor). His grandfather, Zhu Xinglong, Prince of Nanchang, was the eldest brother of the Hongwu Emperor, and his father was Zhu Wenzheng.

== Biography ==
Zhu Wenzheng was the biological nephew of Zhu Yuanzhang and achieved military success in the battle against Chen Youliang, but he became dissatisfied with not being rewarded and secretly colluded with Zhang Shicheng. As a result, Zhu Yuanzhang placed him under house arrest in Tongcheng, where he died soon after. When Zhu Wenzheng died, Zhu Shouqian was only four years old. Zhu Yuanzhang comforted the young boy by stroking his head and saying, "You do not need to be afraid. Your father was unteachable and caused me worry, but I will not abandon you because of his mistakes". Zhu Shouqian was raised in the palace and his childhood name was "Tiezhu." In 1367, his name was changed to "Wei". In 1370, he was given the name "Shouqian" and granted the title of Prince of Jingjiang in the same year.is a history

In 1376, Zhu Shouqian arrived at his fief, Jingjiang (present-day Guilin). He was given a salary equivalent to that of a commandery prince and held an official rank half that of a prince. The Hongwu Emperor appointed the elder Confucian scholar, Zhao Xun (趙塤), as his chief secretary to assist him. Jingjiang had the temporary palace of Toghon Temür, Emperor Shun of Yuan, which was converted into a princely mansion. Zhu Shouqian submitted a memorial to express his gratitude. The Hongwu Emperor instructed his accompanying officials, "Zhu Shouqian is young and has been entrusted with the defense of the southwest. We must guide him well".

Zhu Shouqian, although educated, often aligned himself with villains, causing dissatisfaction among the locals. In 1370, the Hongwu Emperor summoned him and reprimanded him for his actions. In response, Zhu wrote a poem expressing his grievances, which angered the Emperor. As punishment, he was demoted to a commoner and imprisoned in Fengyang for seven years. Eventually, the Hongwu Emperor restored his title and ordered him to defend Yunnan with his brother-in-law, Xu Pu (徐溥), while also receiving a letter of admonition. Despite the Emperor's warnings, Zhu Shouqian remained arrogant and overbearing. This led to the Hongwu Emperor summoning him back to Nanjing and allowing him to reside in Fengyang once again. Zhu Shouqian, however, continued to seize horses, resulting in his imprisonment in Nanjing.

He died in January 1392 and was buried at Purple Mountain in Nanjing. His son, Zhu Zanyi, was still young at the time and was named the Hereditary Prince (世子).

== Family ==
- Lady Xu (徐氏)
  - Zhu Zanyi, Prince Daoxi of Jingjiang (靖江悼僖王 朱贊儀; 1382–1408), second son
  - Zhu Zanlun (朱贊倫), sixth son
- Lady Tian (田氏)
  - Zhu Zanyan (朱贊儼), first son
  - Zhu Zankan (朱贊侃), third son
- Lady Chen (陳氏)
  - Zhu Zanjun (朱贊俊), fourth son
- Lady Zhao (趙氏)
  - Zhu Zanxie (朱贊偕), fifth son
- Lady Wang (王氏)
  - Zhu Zanjie (朱贊傑), seventh son
- Unknown
  - Zhu Zanchu (朱贊儲), eighth son
  - Zhu Zanyi (朱贊億), ninth son
  - Princess Xing'an (興安郡君, first daughter
    - Married Zhu Fu (褚富) in 1394
  - Princess Yongfu (永福郡君, second daughter
    - Married Lu Xuan (褚富) in 1394
  - Princess Chongshan (崇善郡君, third daughter
    - Married Li Ji (李濟) in 1417
  - Princess Yongchun (永淳郡君, fourth daughter
    - Married Wang Duo (王鐸) in 1417

== Descendants and generation names ==
Zhu Shouqian had nine sons. In addition to Zhu Zanyi, who succeeded as Prince of Jingjiang, his other sons were Zhu Zanyan, Zhu Zankan, Zhu Zanjun, Zhu Zanxie, Zhu Zanlun, Zhu Zanjie, Zhu Zanchu and Zhu Zanyi. The princely line of Jingjiang later branched out through these sons, and by the end of the Ming dynasty had become an important imperial-clan community in the Guilin area. After the fall of the Ming dynasty and the Qing conquest of Guilin, more than two thousand members of the Jingjiang princely household are said to have fled, mostly taking refuge in rural counties around Guilin. Their descendants were also distributed in Nanning, Liuzhou, Hezhou, Guigang, Laibin, Qinzhou, Wuzhou and Guangdong.

The Jingjiang princely line used a set of generation names prescribed by the Hongwu Emperor: "Zan, Zuo, Xiang, Gui, Yue; Jing, Bang, Ren, Lü, Heng; Ruo, Yi, Chun, Yi, Xing; Yuan, De, Xi, Fang, Ming" (Chinese: 贊佐相規約，經邦任履亨；若依純一行，遠得襲芳名). The Jingjiang household later added another twenty characters: "Ji, Zhi, Yi, Chong, Ben; Dun, Xiu, Gui, Shang, Xian; Zhen, Jia, Zhao, Guang, Sheng; Bao, Shan, Nai, Chang, Yan" (Chinese: 繼志宜崇本，敦修貴尚賢，振家昭廣盛，寶善乃長延). Genealogical materials of the Zhu clan record a variant form as "Ji, Zhi, Yi, Cong, Ben; Dun, Xiu, Gui, Shang, Xian; Zhen, Jia, Zhao, Guang, Sheng; Bao, Shan, Nai, Chang, Yan" (Chinese: 繼志宜從本，敦修貴尚賢，振家招廣盛，寶善乃長延), and state that descendants of the Jingjiang princes are found in Guilin, Lingui, Yangshuo, Lingchuan, Yongfu, Pingle, Quanzhou and Xiangzhou.

== See also ==
- House of Zhu
- Prince of Jingjiang

Zhu Shouqian House of Zhu Born: 1361 Died: 1392
Chinese royalty
New creation	Prince of Jingjiang; 1370–1380; 1387	Vacant Title next held by Zhu Zanyi
