= Duke Xuan =

Duke Xuan may refer to the following rulers during the Zhou dynasty:

- Duke Xuan of Wey (died 700 BC)
- Duke Xuan of Qin (died 664 BC)
- Duke Xuan of Chen (died 648 BC)
- Duke Xuan of Qi (died 405 BC)

== See also ==
- Marquis Xuan of Cai (died 715 BC)
