= Grand Preceptor =

Chinese imperial ministerial title

- Traditional Chinese: 太師
- Simplified Chinese: 太师
Transcriptions
Standard Mandarin
- Hanyu Pinyin: tàishī

Grand Preceptor, also referred to as Grand Master, was the seniormost of the Three Ducal Ministers or Excellencies, the top three civil positions of the Zhou dynasty of ancient China. The other two were Grand Tutor and Grand Protector. The titles and duties of these positions changed over time. The title of Grand Preceptor was revived during the later parts of the Han dynasty, notably by Dong Zhuo, then Chancellor of State.

It was also used by the Northern Yuan as a title for powerful nobles who were not part of the Chinggisid lineage.

The rank was imitated in the Confucian structure of the Vietnamese court, where the same Chinese title in Vietnamese pronunciation was known as thái sư.
