= Wang Qing (Water Margin) =

Fictional Chinese literary antagonist

- Water Margin character
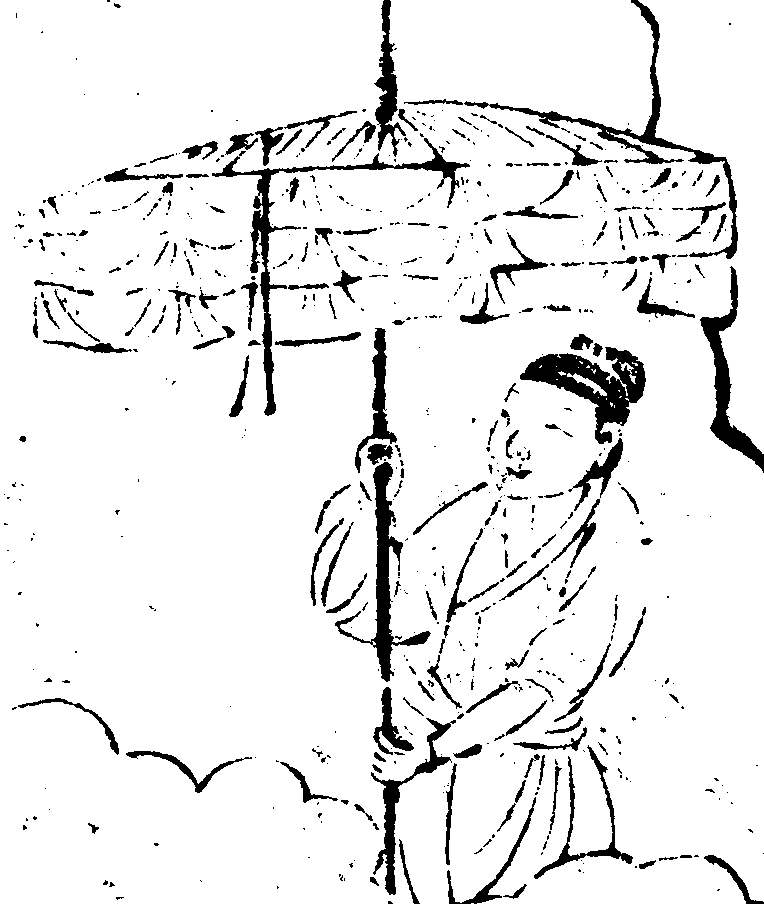
- First appearance: Chapter 101

In-universe information
- Alias: King of Chu (楚王)
- Origin: Military officer
- Designation: Leader of Wang Qing forces
- Ancestral home / Place of origin: Dongjing (present-day Kaifeng, Henan)

Chinese names
- Simplified Chinese: 王庆
- Traditional Chinese: 王慶
- Pinyin: Wáng Qìng
- Wade–Giles: Wang Ching

Wang Qing is a fictional character and antagonist in Water Margin, one of the Four Great Classical Novels of Chinese literature. He is one of the three rebel leaders in the Song dynasty along with Fang La and Tian Hu, that the Liangshan heroes have to defeat in the final chapters of the novel. He only appears in the longest versions of the stories which include these extra chapters.

== Life ==
Illustrations of Wang Qing's story from the Baohan Tower edition of the Water Margin

The novel describes Wang Qing as a seven chi tall, muscular and handsome man with eyes like a phoenix's, thick brows and a high forehead. He comes from a wealthy family in the Song Empire's capital, Dongjing (東京; present-day Kaifeng, Henan). The young Wang Qing was a street rascal who indulged in gambling, prostitution and drinking. When his parents scolded him about his behaviour, he would turn violent and hurl abuses at them, such that they did not dare to bother about him anymore. After leading an extravagant lifestyle for six to seven years, Wang Qing squandered his family's fortune and becomes a military officer in Dongjing.

Wang Qing started his rebellion against the Song Empire in Fangzhou (房州; present-day Fang County, Hubei) after resisting arrest and killing government soldiers. He robs Fangzhou's treasury and granary with his followers and splits the money and grains at different locations near Fangzhou. Within a short period of time, Wang Qing builds up his own military force by raiding nearby villages and towns.

With help from his adviser Li Zhu, Wang Qing seizes control of Jingnan (荊南; present-day Jingzhou, Hubei) and declares himself the "King of Chu" (楚王). After learning of Wang Qing's rebellion, many other bandits and outlaws in the Hubei region pledge their support to him and become part of his Chu kingdom. Within three to four years, Wang Qing has seized control of six prefectures of the Song Empire. He builds himself a palace in Nanfeng (南豐; around present-day Danjiangkou, Hubei). Wang Qing's Chu kingdom expands to eight prefectures later, covering parts of present-day Hubei, Chongqing and Sichuan.

After the Liangshan outlaws receive amnesty from Emperor Huizong, they go on military campaigns to drive back invaders from the Liao Empire in the north and suppress rebel forces on Song territory as a form of service to the Song Empire. After defeating the Liao invaders and Jin kingdom (established by Tian Hu), the Liangshan heroes turn their attention to the Chu kingdom and ultimately emerge victorious. Wang Qing is captured by Liangshan's Li Jun, charged with treason by the Song Empire, and eventually executed by lingchi.
