= Du Xing =

Fictional character in the Chinese classical novel Water Margin

- Water Margin character
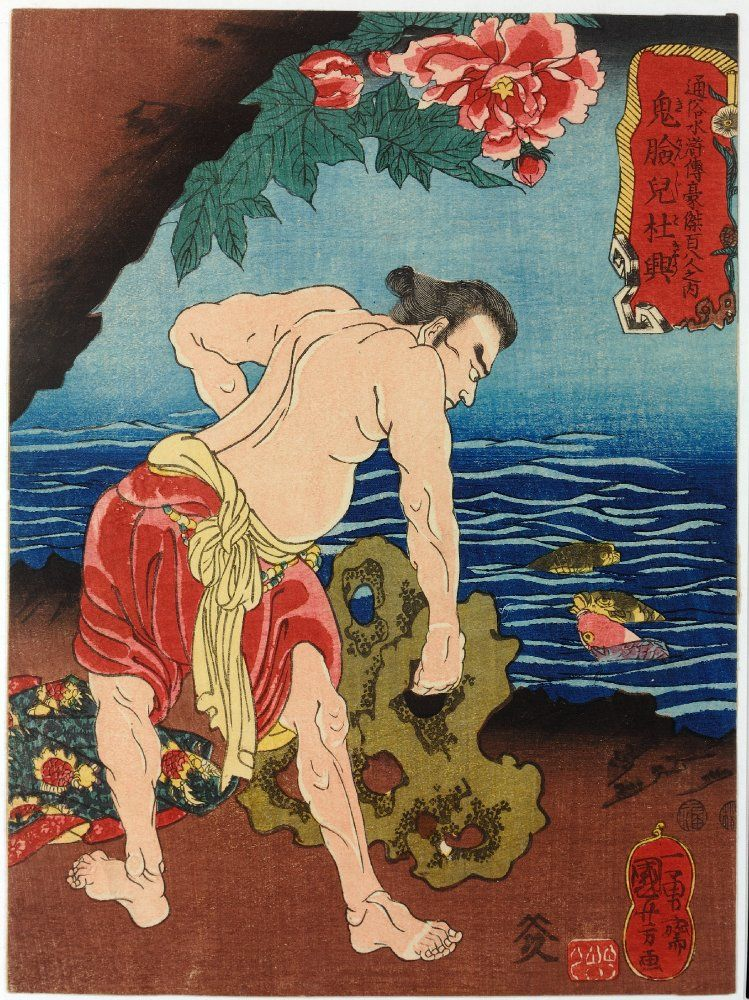
- an illustration of Du Xing by Utagawa Kuniyoshi
- First appearance: Chapter 46

In-universe information
- Nickname: "Demon Face" 鬼臉兒
- Origin: Li Ying's steward
- Designation: Reconnaissance Commander of Liangshan
- Rank: 89th, Complete Star (地全星) of the 72 Earthly Fiends
- Ancestral home / Place of origin: Zhongshan Prefecture (around present-day Dingzhou, Hebei)

Chinese names
- Simplified Chinese: 杜兴
- Traditional Chinese: 杜興
- Pinyin: Dù Xīng
- Wade–Giles: Tu Hsing

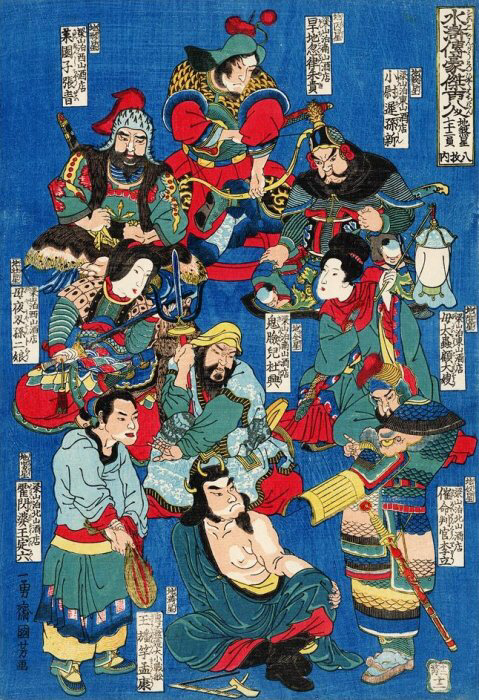
An illustration of nine of the 108 Heroes by Utagawa Kuniyoshi. Du Xing is in the centre. The rest are (clockwise from top): Zhu Gui, Sun Xin, Gu Dasao, Li Li, Meng Kang, Wang Dingliu, Sun Erniang, and Zhang Qing.

Du Xing is a fictional character in Water Margin, one of the Classic Chinese Novels. Nicknamed "Demon Face", he ranks 89th among the 108 Heroes and 53rd among the 72 Earthly Fiends.

== Background ==
Originally from Zhongshan Prefecture (中山府; around present-day Dingzhou, Hebei), Du Xing is nicknamed "Demon Face" for his ugly appearance. While he was doing business in Jizhou (薊州; around present-day Jizhou, Tianjin), he was imprisoned after killing his partner in a heated quarrel. The prison warden, Yang Xiong, helped him secure his release.

== Conflict with the Zhu Family Village ==
Du Xing is first introduced in the novel as a steward serving under Li Ying, the chief of the Li Family Village at Lone Dragon Ridge (獨龍崗) in Yunzhou (鄆州; around present-day Dongping County, Shandong). In the village, he encounters his benefactor Yang Xiong, who has become an outlaw after killing his unfaithful wife. Yang Xiong and his companions – Shi Xiu and Shi Qian – have run into trouble in the neighbouring Zhu Family Village, and Shi Qian has been captured by the Zhus. Du Xing, eager to help Yang Xiong and Shi Xiu, takes them to meet Li Ying and explains the situation.

Li Ying writes a letter to the Zhus, apologising on behalf of the three men for the disturbance they caused in the Zhu Family Village, and politely requests that the Zhus give him face by freeing Shi Qian.

When the Zhus refuse, Li Ying writes another letter and asks Du Xing to deliver it to the Zhus. This time, the Zhus tear up the letter and insult Li Ying, threatening to report him to the authorities for consorting with outlaws. Shocked, Du Xing leaves and reports what has happened to his master.

Li Ying, angered, arms himself and leads his militia to the Zhu Family Village to confront the Zhus. However, he gets wounded after Zhu Biao, one of the Zhu brothers, fires an arrow at him without warning. Luckily, Du Xing, Yang Xiong and Shi Xiu save him and take him back to his village.

While Du Xing remains in the village to take care of his master, Yang Xiong and Shi Xiu make their way to the outlaw stronghold at Liangshan Marsh, where they get the outlaws to help them rescue Shi Qian.

The Liangshan outlaws, who are already unhappy with the Zhus' hostility towards them, launch three assaults on the Zhu Family Village and wipe out the Zhus, rescuing Shi Qian and their comrades captured during the battles. Li Ying and Du Xing do not participate in the battles as the former is recovering from his injury and does not want to get involved in the outlaws' activities.

== Becoming an outlaw ==
Song Jiang, the Liangshan forces' commander, is eager to recruit Li Ying and Du Xing to join Liangshan, so he orders his followers to disguise themselves as the local authorities, go to the Li Family Village, and pretend to arrest Li Ying and Du Xing for being in league with the outlaws.

While Li Ying and Du Xing are being escorted as captives to the prefectural office, Song Jiang and the Liangshan outlaws show up and "rescue" them.

Though initially grateful to the outlaws for saving him, Li Ying turns angry when he realises it is a ruse to trick him into joining Liangshan. Nevertheless, moved by Song Jiang's sincerity, he accepts the offer and joins the Liangshan cause. Du Xing follows suit.

== Campaigns ==
Du Xing is appointed as a commander of Liangshan's reconnaissance team after the 108 Heroes are fully assembled. Together with Zhu Gui, he takes charge of an outpost to the south of Liangshan, disguising and running it as a tavern to gather intelligence.

Du Xing is one of the few Liangshan heroes who survive all the campaigns. To honour him for his contributions during the campaigns, the emperor awards him the title "Martial Gentleman of Grace" (武奕郎) and offers him an official appointment. Du Xing initially accepts, but resigns after learning that Li Ying has left office. The two then return to the Li Family Village at Lone Dragon Ridge and live comfortably for the rest of their lives.
