= Zhang Qing =

Zhang Qing may refer to:

- Zhang Qing (Featherless Arrow), fictional character in Water Margin
- Zhang Qing (Gardener), fictional character in Water Margin
- Zhang Qing (speed skater) (born 1966), Chinese Olympic speed skater
- Zhang Qing (biathlete) (born 1980), Chinese skier
- Jasmine Zhang (born 1978), or Zhang Qing, Chinese talk show host
