= Zhu Gui (Water Margin) =

Fictional character in the Chinese classical novel Water Margin

- Water Margin character
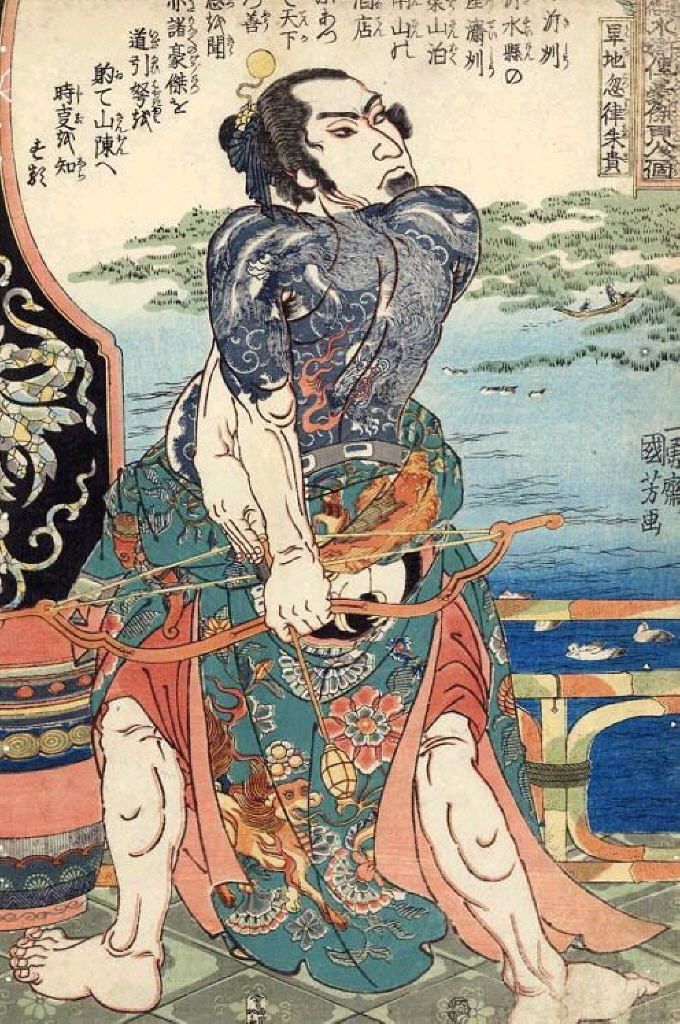
- an illustration of Zhu Gui by Utagawa Kuniyoshi
- First appearance: Chapter 11

In-universe information
- Nickname: "Dry Land Alligator" 旱地忽律
- Origin: outlaw
- Designation: Reconnaissance Commander of Liangshan
- Rank: 92nd, Prisoner Star (地囚星) of the 72 Earthly Fiends
- Ancestral home / Place of origin: Yishui County (in present-day Linyi, Shandong)

Chinese names
- Simplified Chinese: 朱贵
- Traditional Chinese: 朱貴
- Pinyin: Zhū Guì
- Wade–Giles: Chu Kui

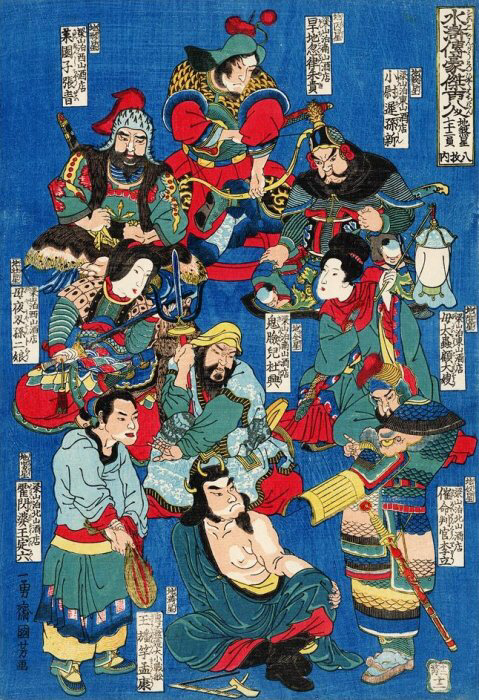
An illustration of nine of the 108 Heroes by Utagawa Kuniyoshi. Du Xing is in the centre. The rest are (clockwise from top): Zhu Gui, Sun Xin, Gu Dasao, Li Li, Meng Kang, Wang Dingliu, Sun Erniang, and Zhang Qing.

Zhu Gui is a fictional character in Water Margin, one of the Classic Chinese Novels. Nicknamed "Dry Land Alligator", he ranks 92nd among the 108 Heroes and 56th among the 72 Earthly Fiends.

== Background ==
The novel describes Zhu Gui as an imposing man with a thin yellowish beard and cheekbones like fists. Originally a merchant, he joins the outlaw band at Liangshan Marsh – led by Wang Lun and his deputies Song Wan and Du Qian – after losing his startup capital. Wang Lun then puts him in charge of an outpost to the south of Liangshan which is disguised as a tavern to gather intelligence for the outlaws. Zhu Gui has a younger brother, Zhu Fu, who also runs a tavern in their hometown in Yishui County.

== Meeting Lin Chong ==
Zhu Gui first appears in the novel when Lin Chong, acting on the nobleman Chai Jin's suggestion, comes to seek shelter at the outlaw stronghold after being forced to go on the run. On his way to Liangshan, Lin Chong stops at Zhu Gui's tavern and unknowingly reveals his identity when he writes a poem on the wall to express his misery. Zhu Gui, upon realising who Lin Chong is, introduces himself and guides him through the marshes to the stronghold to meet Wang Lun.

Wang Lun, worried that Lin Chong might pose a threat to his position as chief, tries to send the latter away with excuses and gifts. Zhu Gui, Song Wan and Du Qian are more welcoming towards Lin Chong, urging Wang Lun to allow Lin to stay. Wang Lun eventually reluctantly accepts Lin Chong.

== Chao Gai becomes chief of Liangshan ==
In a later chapter, when Chao Gai and his six friends come to Liangshan to seek shelter after robbing a convoy of valuable birthday gifts for a corrupt official, Zhu Gui receives them and guides them to the stronghold. Wang Lun, again feeling threatened by the newcomers, tries to send them away with excuses and gifts in the same way he did to Lin Chong.

Wu Yong, one of Chao Gai's companions, senses that Lin Chong already holds a grudge against Wang Lun and is seething when he sees how Wang is treating Chao and his friends. He instigates Lin Chong to kill Wang Lun, after which Chao Gai becomes the new chief of the outlaw band. Zhu Gui, along with Song Wan and Du Qian, accept the outcome and pledge allegiance to Chao Gai.

== Saving Li Kui ==
Zhu Gui appears again in the novel when he and his brother Zhu Fu are secretly instructed by the Liangshan outlaws to keep an eye on their fellow outlaw Li Kui, who has returned to his home village in Yishui County to fetch his mother. Li Kui kills four tigers in revenge after they killed and ate his mother, and takes shelter in the residence of Squire Cao, a wealthy man in the nearby town who secretly finds out who Li Kui is and plots to capture him to collect the bounty on his head.

Still grieving over his mother's death, Li Kui lets his guard down and consumes drinks spiked with menghanyao (蒙汗藥), causing him to feel dizzy and become unconscious. While he is out cold, Squire Cao ties him up and informs Yishui County's magistrate, who sends Li Yun and his men to come to escort Li Kui back to the administrative office.

En route, Li Kui regains consciousness and realises he is a prisoner. Luckily for him, the Zhu brothers have already heard of his capture, and have come up with a plan to save him. Zhu Fu, being Li Yun's apprentice, intercepts the group and pretends to offer them refreshments to congratulate his master on capturing a wanted outlaw. Li Yun and the others unsuspectingly consume the drinks, which have been spiked with menghanyao, and get knocked out. The Zhu brothers then free Li Kui, who kills Squire Cao and all of Li Yun's men. When Li Kui is about to kill Li Yun as well, Zhu Fu stops him, saying that his master is a good man. After Li Yun comes to, he grudgingly accepts his fate and joins the Liangshan outlaws.

== Campaigns and death ==
Zhu Gui is appointed as a commander of Liangshan's reconnaissance team after the 108 Heroes are fully assembled. Together with Du Xing, he continues operating the outpost to the south of Liangshan which is disguised as a tavern to gather intelligence. Along with his brother Zhu Fu, he is also in charge of overseeing the preparation of food and beverages for Liangshan.

After Emperor Huizong grants amnesty to the Liangshan outlaws, Zhu Gui joins them in the campaigns against the Liao invaders and rebel forces in Song territory.

During the final campaign against Fang La's rebel forces, Zhu Gui falls sick after the Liangshan forces capture Hangzhou and eventually succumbs to his illness, not living to see the Liangshan heroes' final victory over Fang La. His brother, who remains behind in Hangzhou to care for him, also catches the same illness and dies shortly after him. After the campaign is over, the emperor honours him for his contributions by awarding him the posthumous title "Righteous Gentleman of Integrity" (義節郎).
