= Li Ying (Water Margin) =

Fictional character in the Chinese classical novel Water Margin

- Water Margin character
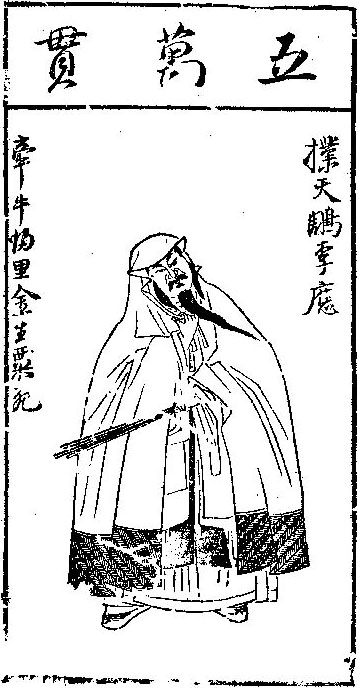
- an illustration of Li Ying by Chen Hongshou
- First appearance: Chapter 47

In-universe information
- Nicknames: "Striking Hawk" 撲天雕
- Weapon: steel alloy spear / lance (渾鐵點鋼槍); flying daggers (飛刀)
- Origin: village chief
- Designation: Chief Accountant of Liangshan
- Rank: 11th, Wealth Star (天富星) of the 36 Heavenly Spirits
- Ancestral home / Place of origin: Yunzhou (around present-day Dongping County, Shandong)

Chinese names
- Simplified Chinese: 李应
- Traditional Chinese: 李應
- Pinyin: Lǐ Yìng
- Wade–Giles: Li Ying

Li Ying is a fictional character in Water Margin, one of the Classic Chinese Novels. Nicknamed "Striking Hawk", he ranks 11th among the 36 Heavenly Spirits, the first third of the 108 Heroes.

== Background ==
The novel describes Li Ying as a unique-looking man with eyes like those of a hawk, a head like that of a tiger, arms like those of an ape, and a waist like that of a wolf. In battle, he dons a red robe, rides a white stallion, and wields a steel alloy spear / lance. He is known for his deadly accuracy in throwing daggers, for which he is nicknamed "Striking Hawk".

Li Ying is the chief of the Li Family Village, which is next to the Zhu and Hu Family Villages at Lone Dragon Ridge (獨龍崗) in Yunzhou (around present-day Dongping County, Shandong). A wealthy man with a militia under his command, Li Ying is known for befriending chivalrous people and being generous with his wealth.

== Conflict with the Zhu Family Village ==
When the outlaw Shi Qian is captured by the Zhus after stealing a rooster at the Zhu Family Village's inn, his companions Yang Xiong and Shi Xiu head towards Liangshan Marsh to seek help from the outlaw band, which they are planning to join.

En route, they meet Du Xing, Yang Xiong's acquaintance who is now serving as Li Ying's steward. Du Xing takes them to meet his master, who writes to the Zhus on Yang Xiong and Shi Xiu's behalf to apologise for the disturbance and request that they give him face and free Shi Qian.

However, the Zhus rudely refuse and insult Li Ying, who then goes to the Zhu Family Village to confront them. Zhu Biao, the youngest of the Zhu brothers, suddenly fires an arrow at Li Ying, wounding him and causing him to fall off his horse. Luckily, Yang Xiong and Shi Xiu rush forth and manage to save Li Ying and take him back to his village.

Yang Xiong and Shi Xiu then head to Liangshan to seek help. Chao Gai, the chief of the Liangshan outlaws, sends Song Jiang to lead an attack on the Zhus, who have already been provoking Liangshan. After three offensives, the outlaws defeat the Zhus and their forces, and overrun the village. Li Ying does not participate in the battle as he is recovering from his injury and also because he does not want to get involved in the outlaws' activities.

== Becoming an outlaw ==
Song Jiang is eager to recruit Li Ying to join Liangshan, so he orders his followers to disguise themselves as the local authorities, go to the Li Family Village, and pretend to arrest Li Ying and Du Xing for being in league with the outlaws. While Li Ying and Du Xing are being escorted as captives to the prefectural office, Song Jiang and the Liangshan outlaws show up and "rescue" them.

Though initially grateful to the outlaws for saving him, Li Ying turns angry when he realises it is a ruse to trick him into joining Liangshan. Nevertheless, moved by Song Jiang's sincerity, he accepts the offer and joins the Liangshan cause.

== Campaigns and later life ==
Li Ying is placed in charge of Liangshan's accounts along with Chai Jin after the 108 Heroes are fully assembled. He participates in the campaigns against the Liao invaders and rebel forces in Song territory after the outlaws receive amnesty from Emperor Huizong.

Li Ying is one of the few Liangshan heroes who survive the campaigns. To honour Li Ying for his contributions, the emperor appoints him as a military officer in Yuncheng County. Six months into his job, Li Ying learns that Chai Jin has resigned and returned home. He quits his job, giving the excuse of poor health. He and Du Xing then return to the Li Family Village at Lone Dragon Ridge and live in comfort for the rest of their lives.
