= Sun Erniang =

Fictional character in the Chinese classical novel Water Margin

- Water Margin character
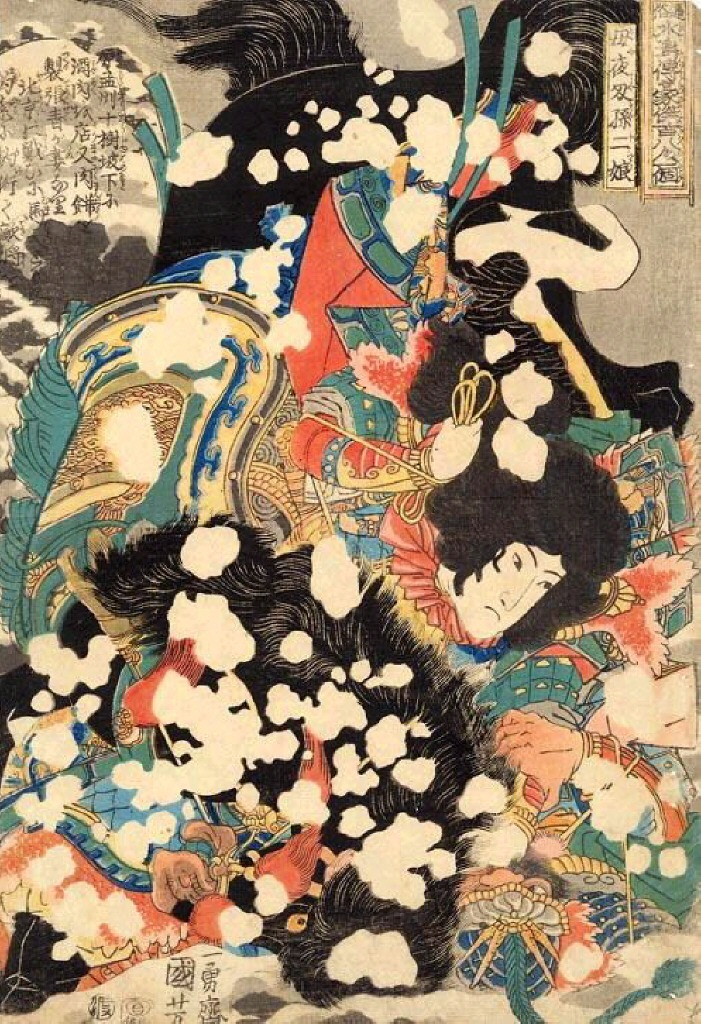
- an illustration of Sun Erniang by Utagawa Kuniyoshi
- First appearance: Chapter 17

In-universe information
- Nicknames: "Female Yaksha" 母夜叉
- Origin: tavern owner
- Designation: Reconnaissance Commander of Liangshan
- Rank: 103rd, Strong Star (地壯星) of the 72 Earthly Fiends

Chinese names
- Simplified Chinese: 孙二娘
- Traditional Chinese: 孫二娘
- Pinyin: Sūn Èrniáng
- Wade–Giles: Sun Erh-niang

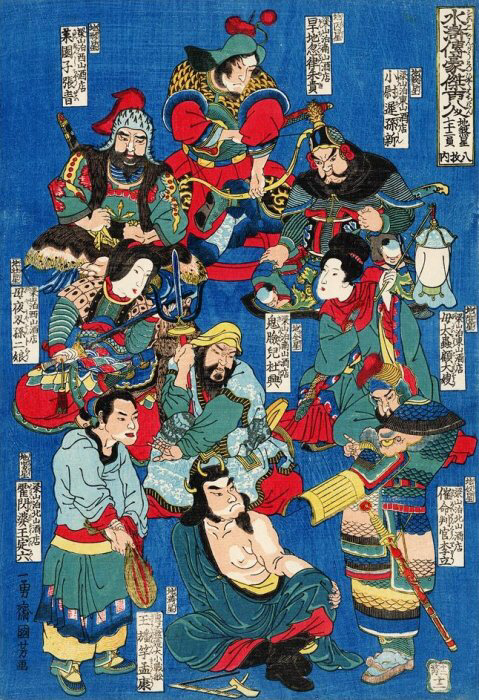
An illustration of nine of the 108 Heroes by Utagawa Kuniyoshi. Du Xing is in the centre. The rest are (clockwise from top): Zhu Gui, Sun Xin, Gu Dasao, Li Li, Meng Kang, Wang Dingliu, Sun Erniang, and Zhang Qing.

Sun Erniang, literally "Second Sister Sun", is a fictional character in Water Margin, one of the Classic Chinese Novels. Nicknamed "Female Yaksha", she ranks 103rd among the 108 Heroes and 67th among the 72 Earthly Fiends.

== Background ==
The novel describes Sun Erniang as a vicious-looking and fiery-tempered woman with thick, muscular limbs. Nicknamed "Female Yaksha" because of her appearance and temperament, she dresses in an unconventional way, often revealing her dudou. She is also well-trained in martial arts by her father, Sun Yuan.

One day, Sun Yuan takes home a man, Zhang Qing, who attempted to rob him earlier but was defeated by him. Zhang Qing, humbled by his defeat, accepts an offer from him to be his martial arts apprentice. Through her father, Sun Erniang gets to know Zhang Qing and eventually marries him.

== Operating a tavern at Cross Slope ==
After her father's death, Sun Erniang moves to Cross Slope (十字坡; at the intersection of present-day Shen County, Shandong and Fan County, Henan) with Zhang Qing, where they operate a tavern. They serve unsuspecting travellers food and drinks spiked with menghanyao (蒙汗藥), a drug that causes dizziness and unconsciousness. Once the victims are knocked out, the couple kills them and seizes their valuables. Sometimes, they use the victims' flesh to make the filling for baozi, which they then serve to other would-be victims.

Despite their gory deeds, Zhang Qing has refrained from targeting three types of people: (1) prisoners sent into exile, since many have been wrongfully convicted by corrupt officials; (2) religious persons who lead ascetic lives; and (3) prostitutes, since they have already suffered much in life. Sun Erniang, however, does not always follow the same principles as her husband, and kills anyone as she wishes.

== Meeting Lu Zhishen ==
At one point, Lu Zhishen, after saving Lin Chong from being murdered, falls victim to the couple while taking a break at their tavern at Cross Slope, losing consciousness after consuming the drugged food and drinks. Just as Sun Erniang is about to butcher the monk, Zhang Qing stops her as he senses something unusual about the monk.

After reviving Lu Zhishen, the couple learns of his identity and befriends him. They advise him to take shelter at the outlaw stronghold on Mount Twin Dragons (二龍山). Lu Zhishen, with help from others, later seizes control of the stronghold.

== Encounters with Wu Song ==
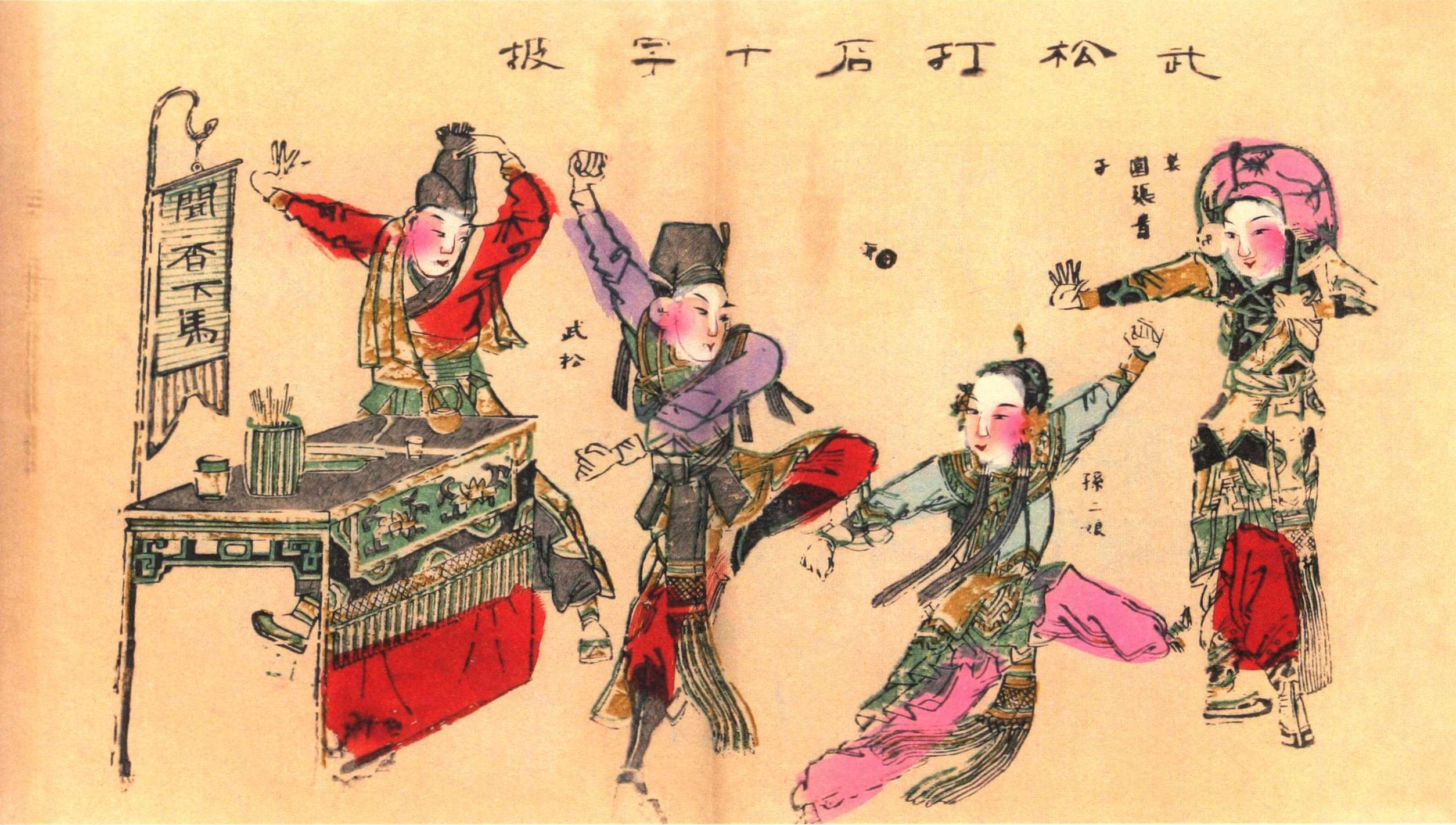
A 1925 woodblock print depicting the struggle between Wu Song and Sun Erniang, with Zhang Qing as the leftmost figure

Sun Erniang and Zhang Qing are first introduced in the novel when they meet Wu Song who, after avenging his murdered brother, has been sentenced to exile in a prison camp in Mengzhou. Wu Song and the two guards escorting him pass by Cross Slope and take a break at the tavern. Sensing that there is something fishy about the tavern, Wu Song secretly pours away the drink served to him, and pretends to lose consciousness like his two escorts after consuming their drinks. When Sun Erniang then tries to lift the apparently unconscious Wu Song, he suddenly gets up, fights with her, and uses a grappling hold to pin her down. Just then, Zhang Qing, who was out on an errand, returns to the tavern and stops the fight. The couple apologises to Wu Song after learning that he is the famous tiger slayer, and treat him like an honoured guest before he leaves with his escorts to continue their journey to Mengzhou.

Wu Song runs into trouble in Mengzhou later and goes on the run after killing a corrupt official and his family. After fleeing Mengzhou, he finds himself at Cross Slope, where he meets Sun Erniang and Zhang Qing again. They help him disguise himself as an untonsured Buddhist pilgrim following the dhūtaguṇa path to avoid being recognised since the authorities have put up wanted notices with his portrait in the vicinity. After that, they direct him to take shelter under the outlaws at Mount Twin Dragons who are led by Lu Zhishen and Yang Zhi.

== Joining Liangshan ==
Sun Erniang and Zhang Qing later head to Mount Twin Dragons to join Wu Song and the other outlaws there. In a later chapter, the outlaws at Mount Twin Dragons are drawn into a battle between their counterparts from Liangshan Marsh and government forces in Qingzhou. The Liangshan outlaws ultimately emerge victorious, and the Mount Twin Dragons outlaws follow them back to Liangshan and join the larger outlaw band there.

== Campaigns and death ==
Sun Erniang is appointed as a commander of Liangshan's reconnaissance team after the 108 Heroes are fully assembled. Together with Zhang Qing, she takes charge of an outpost to the west of Liangshan, disguising and running it as a tavern to gather intelligence.

During the final campaign against Fang La's rebel forces, Sun Erniang is assigned to attack Qingxi County (清溪縣; present-day Chun'an County, Zhejiang). She is killed in battle by the enemy warrior Du Wei, who specialises in throwing daggers. After the campaign, the emperor honours her for her contributions by awarding her the posthumous title "Lady of Jingde Commandery" (旌德郡君).
