= Li Li (Water Margin) =

Fictional character in the Chinese classical novel Water Margin

- Water Margin character
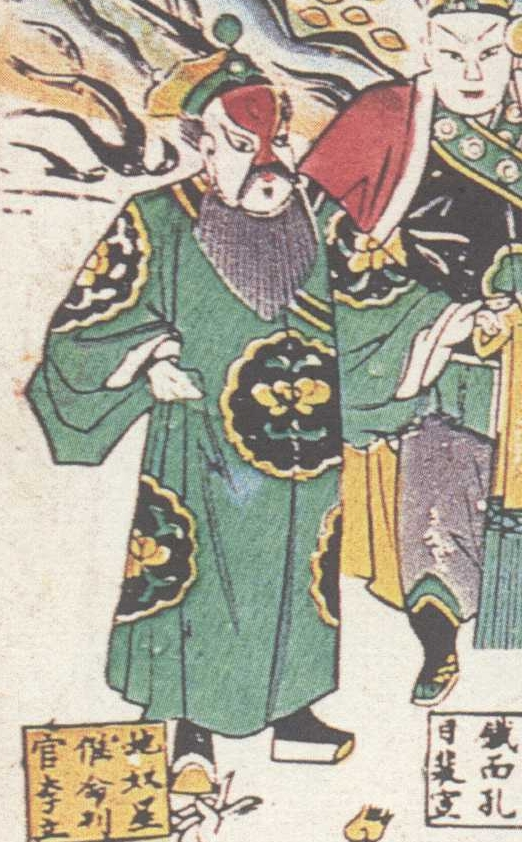
- a Qing dynasty illustration of Li Li
- First appearance: Chapter 36

In-universe information
- Nickname: "Life-taking Judge" 催命判官
- Origin: tavern owner
- Designation: Reconnaissance Commander of Liangshan
- Rank: 96th, Slave Star (地奴星) of the 72 Earthly Fiends
- Ancestral home / Place of origin: Luzhou (present-day Hefei, Anhui)

Chinese names
- Simplified Chinese: 李立
- Traditional Chinese: 李立
- Pinyin: Lǐ Lì
- Wade–Giles: Li Li

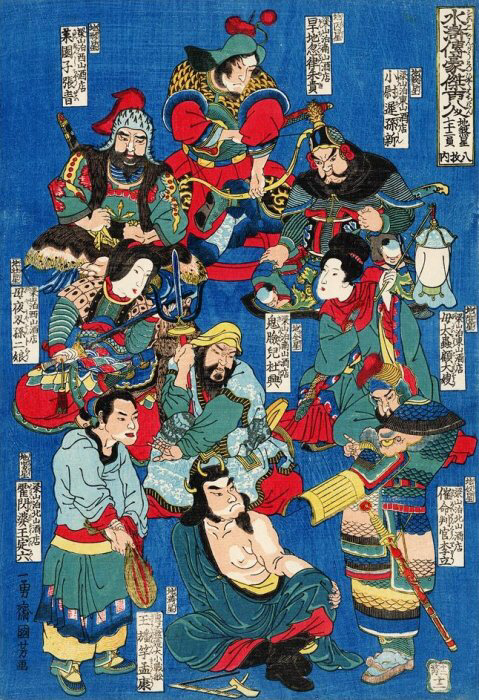
An illustration of nine of the 108 Heroes by Utagawa Kuniyoshi. Du Xing is in the centre. The rest are (clockwise from top): Zhu Gui, Sun Xin, Gu Dasao, Li Li, Meng Kang, Wang Dingliu, Sun Erniang, and Zhang Qing.

Li Li is a fictional character in Water Margin, one of the Classic Chinese Novels. Nicknamed "Life-taking Judge", he ranks 96th among the 108 Heroes and 60th among the 72 Earthly Fiends.

== Background ==
The novel describes Li Li as having a red-hued beard and fiery round eyes like those of a tiger. Originally from Luzhou (蘆州; present-day Hefei, Anhui), he has since moved to Jieyang Ridge (揭陽嶺; believed to be in present-day Jiujiang, Jiangxi) with his close friend, Li Jun.

Li Li opens a tavern on Jieyang Ridge, where he drugs, robs and murders unsuspecting customers, using their flesh to make the filling for baozi. Li Jun, on the other hand, runs a salt smuggling operation on the Xunyang River with his sidekicks, the brothers Tong Wei and Tong Meng.

== Meeting Song Jiang ==
Li Li first meets Song Jiang when the latter passes by Jieyang Ridge on his way to Jiangzhou (江州; present-day Jiujiang, Jiangxi), where he has been exiled to for killing Yan Poxi. While taking a rest in the tavern, Song Jiang and his two escorts unsuspectingly consume drinks spiked with menghanyao (蒙汗藥), a drug which causes dizziness and unconsciousness.

Li Jun and the Tong brothers, who have long heard of Song Jiang's reputation for his chivalry and generosity, have been hoping to meet him at the riverbank. When they learn that Li Li has drugged an exile, they head to the tavern and find an official document on the escorts confirming Song Jiang's identity. They then get Li Li to revive Song Jiang and apologise to him, after which they introduce themselves to Song and treat him hospitably before seeing him off.

== Becoming an outlaw ==
Song Jiang later runs into trouble in Jiangzhou when he writes a seditious poem after getting drunk. He is arrested and sentenced to death, but his outlaw friends from Liangshan Marsh show up in full force, storm the execution ground, and save him.

After fleeing Jiangzhou, the whole lot gets stranded in a temple at the riverbank while government forces close in. At that moment, Li Li, Li Jun, and the others whom Song Jiang has met and befriended earlier at Jieyang Ridge suddenly appear in their boats and ferry everyone to safety. After that, Li Li and the others join the outlaw band at Liangshan Marsh.

== Campaigns and death ==
Li Li is appointed as a commander of Liangshan's reconnaissance team after the 108 Heroes are fully assembled. Together with Wang Dingliu, he takes charge of an outpost to the north of Liangshan, disguising and running it as a tavern to gather intelligence.

After Emperor Huizong grants amnesty to the Liangshan outlaws, Li Li joins them in the campaigns against the Liao invaders and rebel forces in Song territory. During the final campaign against Fang La's rebel forces, Li Li is severely injured at the battle of Qingxi County (清溪縣; present-day Chun'an County, Zhejiang) and eventually succumbs to his wounds.
