= Meng Kang =

Fictional character in the Chinese classical novel Water Margin

- Water Margin character
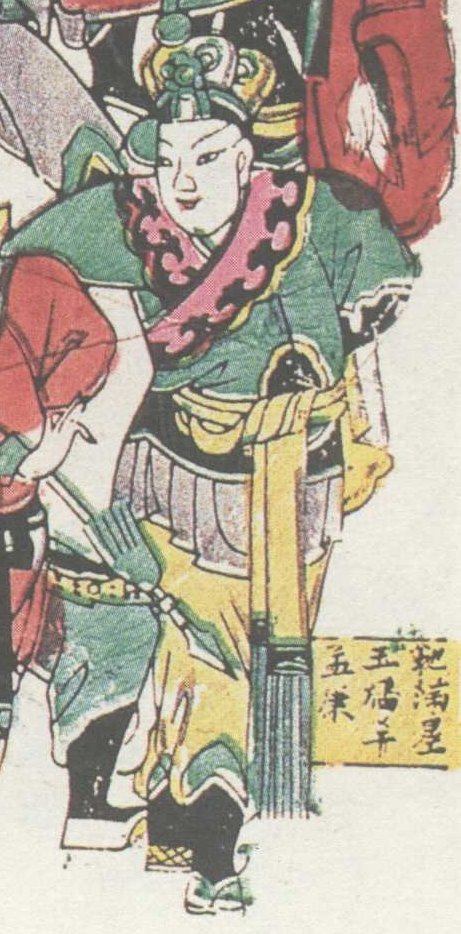
- a Qing dynasty illustration of Meng Kang
- First appearance: Chapter 44

In-universe information
- Nickname: "Jade Flagpole" 玉幡竿
- Origin: outlaw
- Designation: Chief Shipwright of Liangshan
- Rank: 70th, Full Star (地滿星) of the 72 Earthly Fiends
- Ancestral home / Place of origin: Zhending Prefecture (around present-day Zhengding County, Hebei)

Chinese names
- Simplified Chinese: 孟康
- Traditional Chinese: 孟康
- Pinyin: Mèng Kāng
- Wade–Giles: Meng K'ang

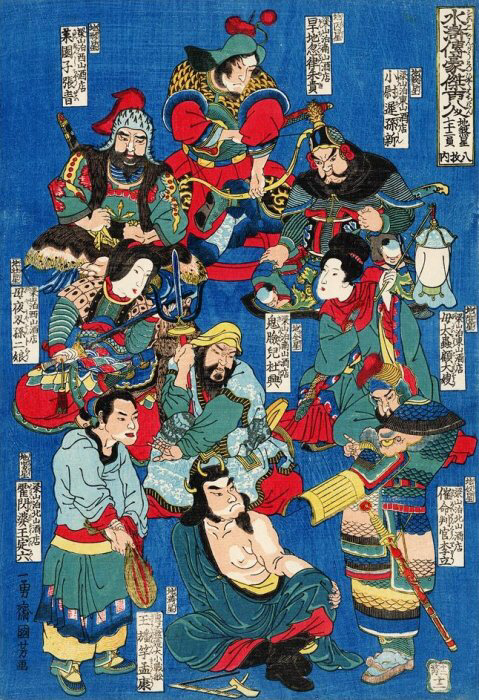
An illustration of nine of the 108 Heroes by Utagawa Kuniyoshi. Du Xing is in the centre. The rest are (clockwise from top): Zhu Gui, Sun Xin, Gu Dasao, Li Li, Meng Kang, Wang Dingliu, Sun Erniang, and Zhang Qing.

Meng Kang is a fictional character in Water Margin, one of the Classic Chinese Novels. Nicknamed "Jade Flagpole", he ranks 70th among the 108 Heroes and 34th among the 72 Earthly Fiends.

== Background ==
Originally a shipwright from Zhending Prefecture (真定府; around present-day Zhengding County, Hebei), Meng Kang is nicknamed "Jade Flagpole" for his fair complexion and tall and slim build. He was initially commissioned by the Song government to construct vessels for transporting huashigang (花石綱) – a convoy of rare minerals and plants – to the capital Dongjing (東京; present-day Kaifeng, Henan) to decorate a park in the palace. His supervisor was overbearing and demanding, often punishing him for minor faults. In a fit of anger, he killed the man and went on the run.

Meng Kang is first introduced in the novel as the third of three leaders of a small outlaw group based at Yinma River (飲馬川; in present-day Jizhou, Tianjin), ranking after Pei Xuan and Deng Fei.

== Joining Liangshan ==
Meng Kang, along with Pei Xuan and Deng Fei, makes his first appearance in the novel when they are introduced by Yang Lin, an old acquaintance of Deng Fei, to Dai Zong when he passes by Yinma River on his way to find Gongsun Sheng in Jizhou (薊州; present-day Jizhou, Tianjin).

Dai Zong, who is already part of the outlaw band at Liangshan Marsh, invites Yang Lin and the outlaws at Yinma River to join Liangshan, and they accept.

== Campaigns and death ==
Meng Kang is appointed as the chief shipwright of Liangshan after the 108 Heroes are fully assembled, overseeing the construction of boats and ships. He participates in the campaigns against the Liao invaders and rebel forces in Song territory after the outlaws receive amnesty from Emperor Huizong.

During the final campaign against Fang La's rebel forces, Meng Kang is assigned to attack Black Dragon Ridge (烏龍嶺; northeast of present-day Meicheng Town, Jiande, Zhejiang). There, he is trapped by the enemy and blasted into bits by artillery fire.
