= Wang Dingliu =

Fictional character in the Chinese classical novel Water Margin

- Water Margin character
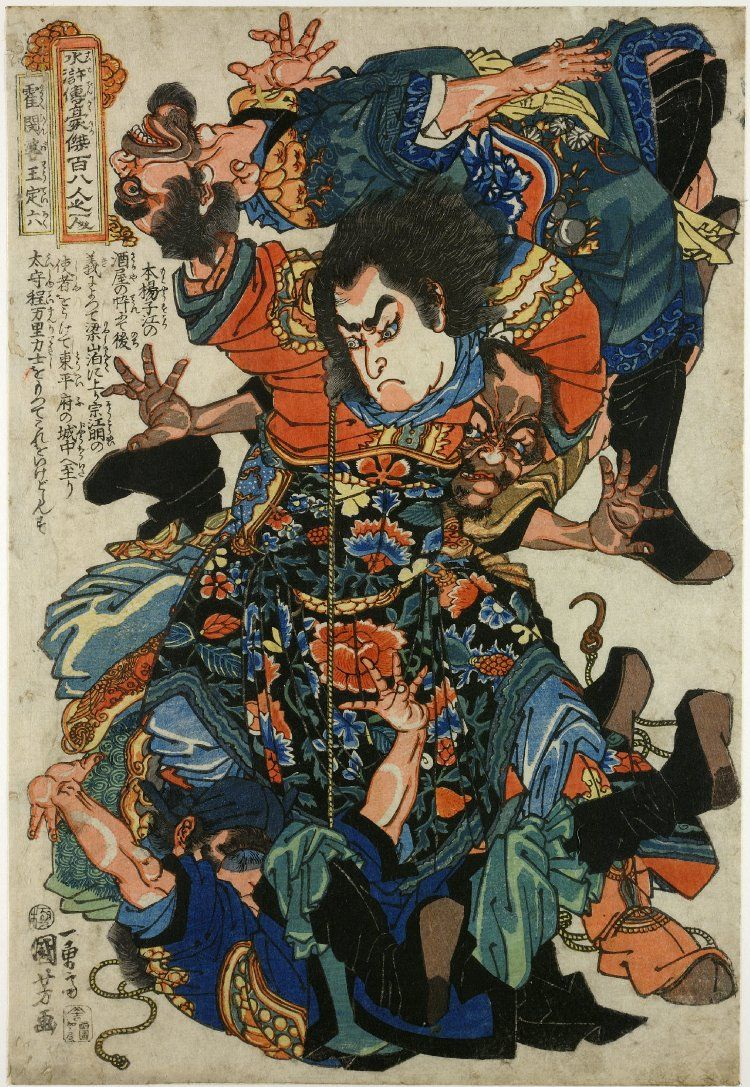
- an illustration of Wang Dingliu by Utagawa Kuniyoshi
- First appearance: Chapter 65

In-universe information
- Nicknames: "Living Goddess (Note: Dianmu (電母; literally "Mother of Lightning"), the lightning deity in Chinese mythology, is female. This is why Wang Dingliu is not nicknamed "Living God of Lightning".) of Lightning" 活閃婆
- Origin: tavern owner
- Designation: Reconnaissance Commander of Liangshan
- Rank: 104th, Inferior Star (地劣星) of the 72 Earthly Fiends
- Ancestral home / Place of origin: Jiankang Prefecture (present-day Nanjing, Jiangsu)

Chinese names
- Simplified Chinese: 王定六
- Traditional Chinese: 王定六
- Pinyin: Wáng Dìngliù
- Wade–Giles: Wang Ting-liu

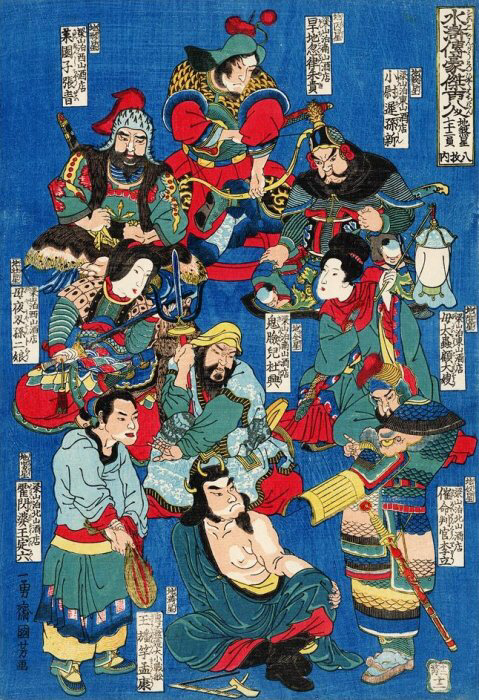
An illustration of nine of the 108 Heroes by Utagawa Kuniyoshi. Du Xing is in the centre. The rest are (clockwise from top): Zhu Gui, Sun Xin, Gu Dasao, Li Li, Meng Kang, Wang Dingliu, Sun Erniang, and Zhang Qing.

Wang Dingliu is a fictional character in Water Margin, one of the Classic Chinese Novels. Nicknamed "Living Goddess of Lightning", he ranks 104th among the 108 Heroes and 68th among the 72 Earthly Fiends.

== Background ==
The novel describes Wang Dingliu as a man with a pointed head, sparkling eyes, and skinny legs. Nicknamed "Living Goddess of Lightning", he is known for his uncanny ability to walk at a very fast pace. He is also an excellent swimmer and has learnt various forms of martial arts before.

Originally from Jiankang Prefecture (建康府; present-day Nanjing, Jiangsu), Wang Dingliu runs a tavern on the bank of the Yangtze River with his father.

== Becoming an outlaw ==
Wang Dingliu is first introduced in the novel when he encounters the Liangshan outlaw Zhang Shun, who is on his way to Jiankang Prefecture to find the physician An Daoquan to heal Liangshan's Song Jiang, who has become seriously ill. Earlier, while crossing the Yangtze, Zhang Shun was caught off guard and robbed by the pirate Zhang Wang, who tied him up and threw him into the river. Zhang Shun, being a powerful swimmer, freed himself underwater and swam to the riverbank. He finds Wang Dingliu's tavern and takes shelter there; the Wangs treat him kindly and give him a set of dry clothes to change out.

Upon learning that Zhang Shun is a Liangshan outlaw, Wang Dingliu, who has always wanted to join Liangshan, asks Zhang to introduce him to the band. However, Zhang Shun has to leave urgently for Jiankang Prefecture.

Wang Dingliu appears again later after Zhang Shun has found An Daoquan and forced him to become an outlaw too by framing him for murder. They stop at Wang Dingliu's tavern on the way back, and agree to take him along to Liangshan.

They board Zhang Wang's boat and Wang Dingliu, whom Zhang Wang knows, lies that the two men with him are his relatives. When the boat is in the middle of the river, Zhang Shun, who has been hiding his face earlier, suddenly reveals himself to Zhang Wang. With Wang Dingliu's help, Zhang Shun overpowers Zhang Wang, ties him up and throws him into the river in revenge. After that, the three of them return to Liangshan, and Wang Dingliu becomes a member of the outlaw band.

== Life at Liangshan ==
Wang Dingliu appears again in a later chapter when the Liangshan outlaws are attacking Dongping Prefecture (東平府; present-day Dongping County, Shandong). Song Jiang, who is leading the outlaws, sends Wang Dingliu and Yu Baosi as his messengers to meet the prefectural governor and demand his surrender.

Initially, the governor feels intimidated by the outlaws and considers surrendering. However, the military officer Dong Ping steps in, reassuring the governor that he will hold off the outlaws. Dong Ping also urges the governor to execute Wang Dingliu and Yu Baosi to demonstrate his resolve, but the governor instead has the two men flogged and thrown out of the city.

The Liangshan outlaws ultimately defeat Dong Ping, win him over to their side, and capture the prefecture.

== Campaigns and death ==
Wang Dingliu is appointed as a commander of Liangshan's reconnaissance team after the 108 Heroes are fully assembled. Together with Li Li, he takes charge of an outpost to the north of Liangshan, disguising and running it as a tavern to gather intelligence.

After the outlaws receive amnesty from Emperor Huizong, Wang Dingliu participates in the campaigns against the Liao invaders and rebel forces in Song territory.

During the final campaign against Fang La's rebel forces, Wang Dingliu is assigned to attack Xuanzhou (宣州; present-day Xuancheng, Anhui). He dies of poisoning after being hit by a poisoned arrow in the midst of battle. After the campaign, the emperor honours Wang Dingliu for his contributions by awarding him the posthumous title "Righteous Gentleman of Integrity" (義節郎).
