= Zhang Qing (Water Margin) =

Fictional character in the Chinese classical novel Water Margin

- Water Margin character
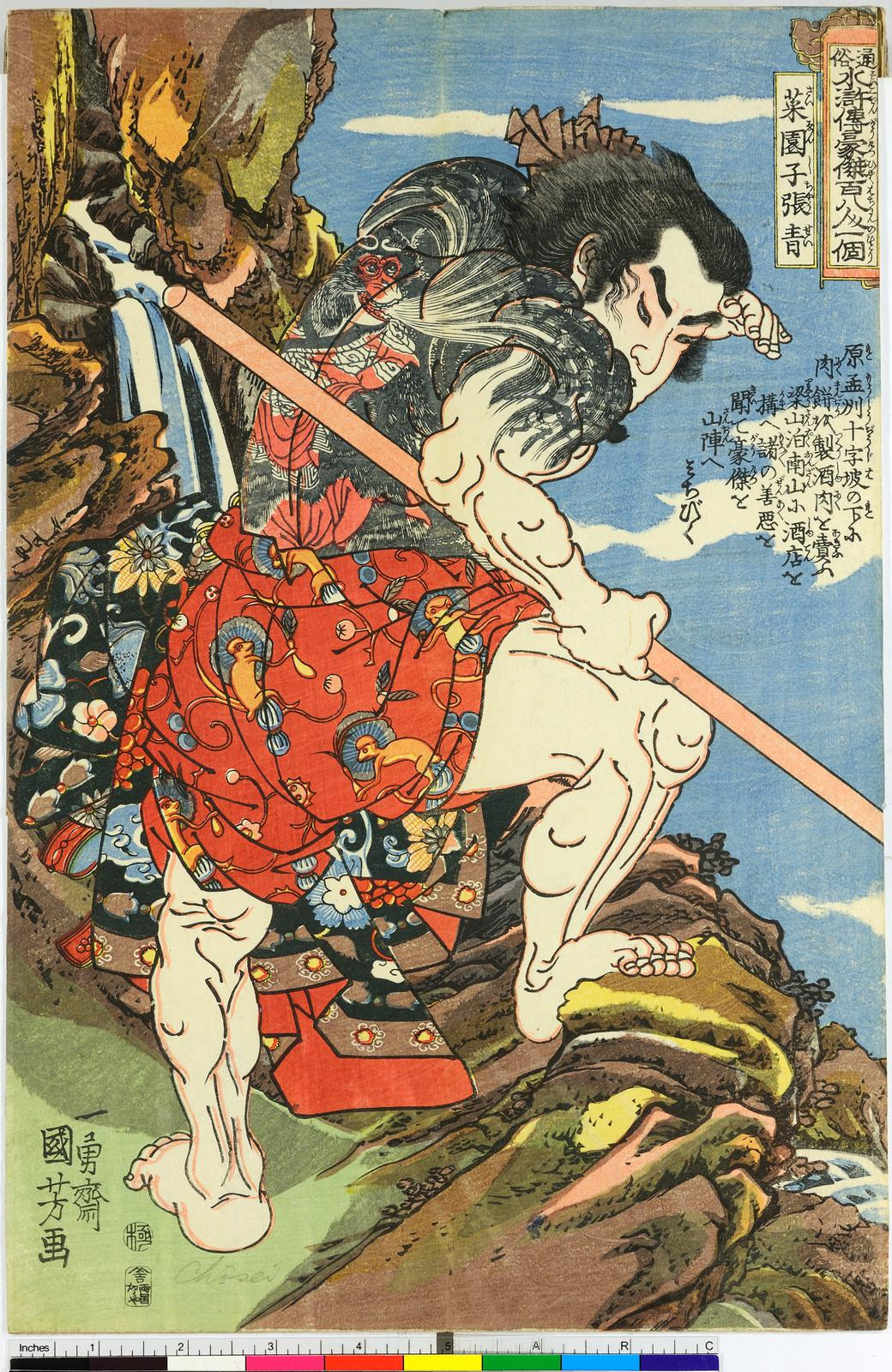
- an illustration of Zhang Qing by Utagawa Kuniyoshi
- First appearance: Chapter 17

In-universe information
- Nicknames: "Gardener" 菜園子
- Origin: gardener, tavern owner
- Designation: Reconnaissance Commander of Liangshan
- Rank: 102nd, Execute Star (地刑星) of the 72 Earthly Fiends
- Ancestral home / Place of origin: Mengzhou, Henan

Chinese names
- Simplified Chinese: 张青
- Traditional Chinese: 張青
- Pinyin: Zhāng Qīng
- Wade–Giles: Chang Ch'ing

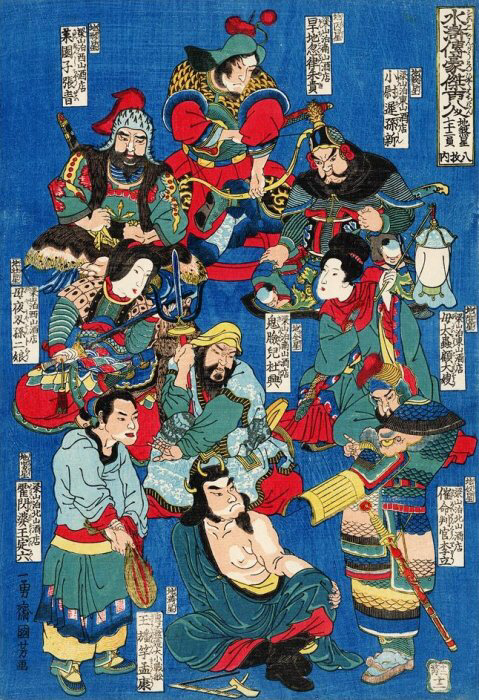
An illustration of nine of the 108 Heroes by Utagawa Kuniyoshi. Du Xing is in the centre. The rest are (clockwise from top): Zhu Gui, Sun Xin, Gu Dasao, Li Li, Meng Kang, Wang Dingliu, Sun Erniang, and Zhang Qing.

Zhang Qing is a fictional character in Water Margin, one of the Classic Chinese Novels. Nicknamed "Gardener", he ranks 102nd among the 108 Heroes and 66th among the 72 Earthly Fiends.

== Background ==
The novel describes Zhang Qing as a peculiar-looking man with sparse facial hair. Originally a gardener in a monastery in Mengzhou, he becomes an outlaw after killing the monks and burning down the monastery following a heated quarrel. He flees to Cross Slope (十字坡; at the intersection of present-day Shen County, Shandong and Fan County, Henan), where he robs unwary travellers for a living.

One day, Zhang Qing attempts to rob an elderly man but ends up losing to him in a fight. Recognising Zhang Qing's potential, the elderly man named Sun Yuan invites him to his home and offers to train him in martial arts. Zhang Qing humbly accepts, and eventually also marries his master's daughter, Sun Erniang.

== Operating a tavern at Cross Slope ==
After his father-in-law's death, Zhang Qing moves back to Cross Slope with Sun Erniang, where they operate a tavern. They serve unsuspecting travellers food and drinks spiked with menghanyao (蒙汗藥), a drug that causes dizziness and unconsciousness. Once the victims are knocked out, the couple kills them and seizes their valuables. Sometimes, they use the victims' flesh to make the filling for baozi, which they then serve to other would-be victims.

Despite their gory deeds, Zhang Qing has refrained from targeting three types of people: (1) prisoners sent into exile, since many have been wrongfully convicted by corrupt officials; (2) religious persons who lead ascetic lives; and (3) prostitutes, since they have already suffered much in life. Sun Erniang, however, does not always follow the same principles as her husband, and kills anyone as she wishes.

== Meeting Lu Zhishen ==
At one point, Lu Zhishen, after saving Lin Chong from being murdered, falls victim to the couple while taking a break at their tavern at Cross Slope, losing consciousness after consuming the drugged food and drinks. Just as Sun Erniang is about to butcher the monk, Zhang Qing stops her as he senses something unusual about the monk.

After reviving Lu Zhishen, the couple learns of his identity and befriends him. They advise him to take shelter at the outlaw stronghold on Mount Twin Dragons (二龍山). Lu Zhishen, with help from others, later seizes control of the stronghold.

== Encounters with Wu Song ==
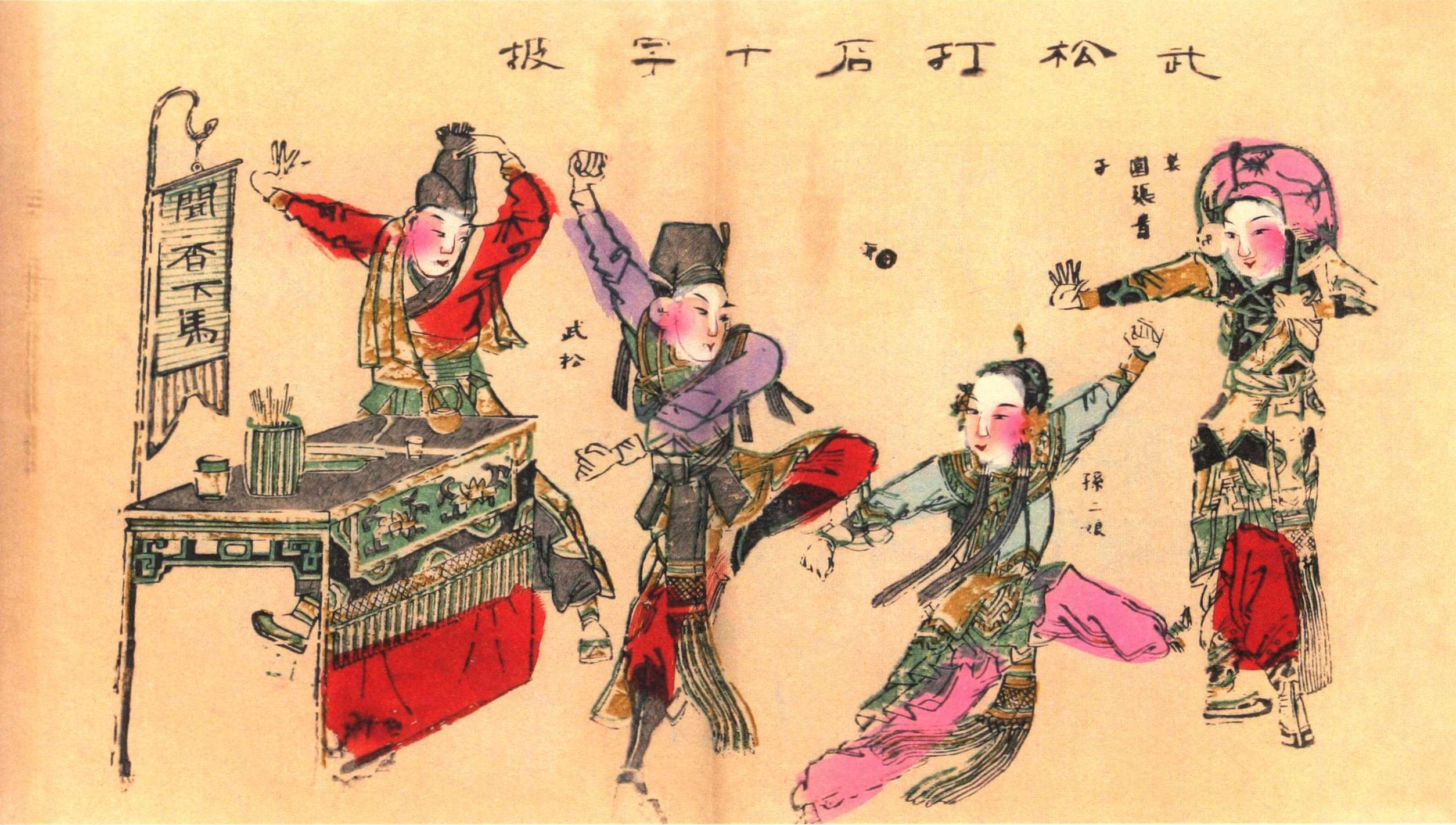
A 1925 woodblock print depicting the struggle between Wu Song and Sun Erniang, with Zhang Qing as the leftmost figure

Zhang Qing and Sun Erniang are first introduced in the novel when they meet Wu Song who, after avenging his murdered brother, has been sentenced to exile in a prison camp in Mengzhou. Wu Song and the two guards escorting him pass by Cross Slope and take a break at the tavern. Sensing that there is something fishy about the tavern, Wu Song secretly pours away the drink served to him, and pretends to lose consciousness like his two escorts after consuming their drinks. When Sun Erniang then tries to lift the apparently unconscious Wu Song, he suddenly gets up, fights with her, and uses a grappling hold to pin her down. Just then, Zhang Qing, who was out on an errand, returns to the tavern and stops the fight. The couple apologises to Wu Song after learning that he is the famous tiger slayer, and treat him like an honoured guest before he leaves with his escorts to continue their journey to Mengzhou.

Wu Song runs into trouble in Mengzhou later and goes on the run after killing a corrupt official and his family. After fleeing Mengzhou, he finds himself at Cross Slope, where he meets Zhang Qing and Sun Erniang again. They help him disguise himself as an untonsured Buddhist pilgrim following the dhūtaguṇa path to avoid being recognised since the authorities have put up wanted notices with his portrait in the vicinity. After that, they direct him to take shelter under the outlaws at Mount Twin Dragons who are led by Lu Zhishen and Yang Zhi.

== Joining Liangshan ==
Zhang Qing and Sun Erniang later head to Mount Twin Dragons to join Wu Song and the other outlaws there. In a later chapter, the outlaws at Mount Twin Dragons are drawn into a battle between their counterparts from Liangshan Marsh and government forces in Qingzhou. The Liangshan outlaws ultimately emerge victorious, and the Mount Twin Dragons outlaws follow them back to Liangshan and join the larger outlaw band there.

== Campaigns and death ==
Zhang Qing is appointed as a commander of Liangshan's reconnaissance team after the 108 Heroes are fully assembled. Together with Sun Erniang, he takes charge of an outpost to the west of Liangshan, disguising and running it as a tavern to gather intelligence.

During the final campaign against Fang La's rebel forces, Zhang Qing is assigned to attack Shezhou (歙州; present-day She County, Anhui). He is killed in the midst of battle when the Liangshan forces are thrown into confusion by a sudden enemy attack.
