= Shi Xiu =

Fictional character in the Chinese classical novel Water Margin

- Water Margin character
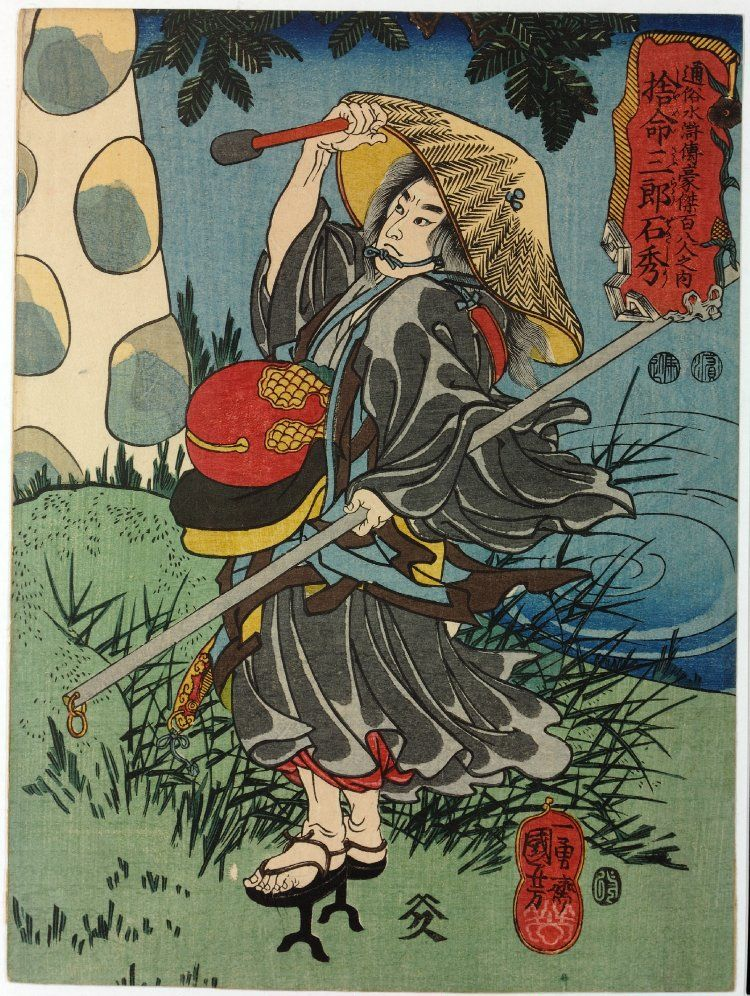
- an illustration of Shi Xiu by Utagawa Kuniyoshi
- First appearance: Chapter 44

In-universe information
- Nicknames: "Daredevil Third Brother" 拚命三郎
- Weapon: podao
- Origin: firewood seller
- Designation: Infantry Commander of Liangshan
- Rank: 33rd, Wisdom Star (天慧星) of the 36 Heavenly Spirits
- Ancestral home / Place of origin: Jiankang Prefecture (present-day Nanjing, Jiangsu)

Chinese names
- Simplified Chinese: 石秀
- Traditional Chinese: 石秀
- Pinyin: Shí Xiù
- Wade–Giles: Shih Hsiu

Shi Xiu is a fictional character in Water Margin, one of the Classic Chinese Novels. Nicknamed "Daredevil Third Brother", he ranks 33rd among the 36 Heavenly Spirits, the first third of the 108 Heroes.

== Background ==
Originally from Jiankang Prefecture (建康府; present-day Nanjing, Jiangsu), Shi Xiu is described in the novel as a tall, muscular, and good-looking young man who has been well-trained in martial arts since childhood. Intolerant of bullying, he has a tendency to intervene to help the victim(s) whenever he witnesses injustice, often risking his life to do so. As such, he is nicknamed "Daredevil Third Brother".

Shi Xiu started out by accompanying his uncle, who was a merchant, on business trips. When his uncle died, their business suffered a huge loss and Shi Xiu could not afford the journey home. He ends up settling down in Jizhou (薊州; present-day Jizhou, Tianjin), where he makes a living by selling firewood.

== Meeting Yang Xiong ==
Shi Xiu is first introduced in the novel when he rushes to help Yang Xiong, who is being attacked by hooligans on the street. The hooligans flee when they realise they are no match for the two men. Grateful to Shi Xiu for saving him, Yang Xiong becomes sworn brothers with Shi Xiu and invites him to live in his residence and help him run a butcher stall.

During his stay in the Yang residence, Shi Xiu discovers that his sworn brother's wife, Pan Qiaoyun, is having an affair with a Buddhist monk, Pei Ruhai.

Yang Xiong, after learning about the affair from Shi Xiu, confronts Pan Qiaoyun. However, she turns the tables by accusing Shi Xiu of making sexual advances on her. Yang Xiong, taken in by his wife's lies, severs ties with Shi Xiu and kicks him out of the house.

== Becoming an outlaw ==
Determined to reveal the truth, Shi Xiu ambushes Pei Ruhai one night shortly after he leaves the Yang residence and kills him. He then takes the monk's robe and other personal effects, and shows them to Yang Xiong, vouching with his life that what he said is true.

The next day, Yang Xiong takes Pan Qiaoyun and their servant Ying'er to the nearby Cuiping Hill (翠屏山) under the pretext of paying respects to his ancestors. On the hill, he confronts his wife again, demanding the truth from her and showing her Pei Ruhai's robe and personal effects. Pan Qiaoyun, seeing that her secret lover is dead, confesses to the affair. At Shi Xiu's instigation, Yang Xiong kills his unfaithful wife and Ying'er, who had abetted her mistress in the affair.

Yang Xiong and Shi Xiu decide to take refuge in the outlaw stronghold at Liangshan Marsh. Shi Qian, who has been hiding and has witnessed the murders, reveals himself and threatens to report them to the authorities if they refuse to take him along to Liangshan. They gladly agree.

== Conflict with the Zhu Family Village ==
En route to Liangshan, the trio stops at a tavern for a meal. During this time, Shi Qian steals a rooster and cooks it for their meal since the place does not serve any palatable food. A fight breaks out when the tavern owner, after accusing Shi Qian of theft, calls for help upon hearing Shi Xiu claim that the three of them are from Liangshan. Unknown to the three men, the tavern is under the protection of the Zhu Family Village, a fortified village run by three brothers and their father who are very hostile towards the Liangshan outlaws. The three men burn down the tavern and flee, with dozens of armed men from the village in pursuit. Shi Qian accidentally stumbles into a trap and gets captured.

Yang Xiong and Shi Xiu escape and take shelter in the nearby Li Family Village, whose master Li Ying is sympathetic towards them. Li Ying then writes to the Zhus, apologising on behalf of the three men for the disturbance, and kindly requesting that the Zhus give him face by freeing Shi Qian. The situation escalates into violence when the Zhus not only turn down Li Ying's request, but also insult him, prompting Li to confront them. Zhu Biao, the youngest of the Zhu brothers, injures Li Ying with an arrow shot, forcing him to retreat. Left with no other option, Yang Xiong and Shi Xiu make their way to Liangshan to seek help.

== Spying for Liangshan ==
The Liangshan outlaws, who have already been itching to teach the Zhus a lesson, mobilise their forces to attack the Zhu Family Village, with Yang Xiong and Shi Xiu joining them.

Before the first battle, Shi Xiu volunteers to sneak into the village to spy for the outlaws. Disguised as a firewood seller, he hears from an elderly villager that there is a maze of winding roads in the woods outside the village, and learns how to navigate it. When the outlaws get lost in the maze during their first assault on the village, Shi Xiu shows up and guides them out safely.

Later, when Sun Li and his group pretend to join the Zhus in their fight against the Liangshan outlaws, the Zhus are initially suspicious of them. During the second battle, Shi Xiu pretends to engage Sun Li in a duel on horseback and deliberately allows Sun Li to defeat and capture him, gaining the Zhus' trust.

On their third assault on the village, the outlaws, aided by Sun Li, Shi Xiu and others from within the village, manage to defeat the Zhus and score a major victory. Shi Xiu saves the elderly villager who helped him earlier, and officially becomes a member of the Liangshan outlaw band.

== Attempt to save Lu Junyi ==
Shi Xiu plays an important role later in the novel in Lu Junyi's story arc. After being betrayed and accused of consorting with the Liangshan outlaws, Lu Junyi is thrown into prison in Daming Prefecture (大名府; present-day Daming County, Hebei). Afterwards, he is sentenced to exile at Shamen Island (沙門島; present-day Changdao County, Shandong).

The guards escorting Lu Junyi into exile have been bribed to murder him on the way. However, Lu Junyi is saved by his faithful servant, Yan Qing. When Yan Qing temporarily leaves his master to look for food, Lu Junyi, weakened from starvation and torture in prison, is recaptured by government forces.

Meanwhile, Yan Qing runs Shi Xiu, who has come to gather intelligence in Daming Prefecture, and attempts to rob him without knowing his identity. After they realise who each other is and Shi Xiu learns of what has happened, he tells Yan Qing to go to Liangshan to seek help.

Shi Xiu infiltrates Daming Prefecture and learns that Lu Junyi has been sentenced to death. When Lu Junyi is about to be beheaded on the street, Shi Xiu leaps off the upper floor of an adjacent building and calls out, "The Liangshan heroes are here!" He then tries to single-handedly save Lu Junyi and fight his way out. However, his valiant attempt is futile as both of them are eventually overwhelmed and taken captive by government forces.

When Shi Xiu is brought before Daming Prefecture's governor Liang Shijie, he berates the governor, who is shocked by the outlaw's fearlessness. Liang Shijie then decides to keep Shi Xiu and Lu Junyi alive as hostages in case the outlaws come for them.

The Liangshan outlaws indeed come to attack Daming Prefecture to save Shi Xiu and Lu Junyi, infiltrating the city during the Lantern Festival and causing chaos. Taking advantage of the situation, they break into the prison and free the two men.

== Campaigns and death ==
Shi Xiu is appointed as a commander of the Liangshan infantry after the 108 Heroes are fully assembled. He participates in the campaigns against the Liao invaders and rebel forces in Song territory after the outlaws receive amnesty from Emperor Huizong.

During the final campaign against Fang La's rebel forces, Shi Xiu is assigned to attack Yuling Pass (昱嶺關; near present-day Zhupu Village, She County, Anhui). He falls into an ambush and gets killed by archers under Pang Wanchun.
