= Yang Xiong (Water Margin) =

Fictional character in the Chinese classical novel Water Margin

- Water Margin character
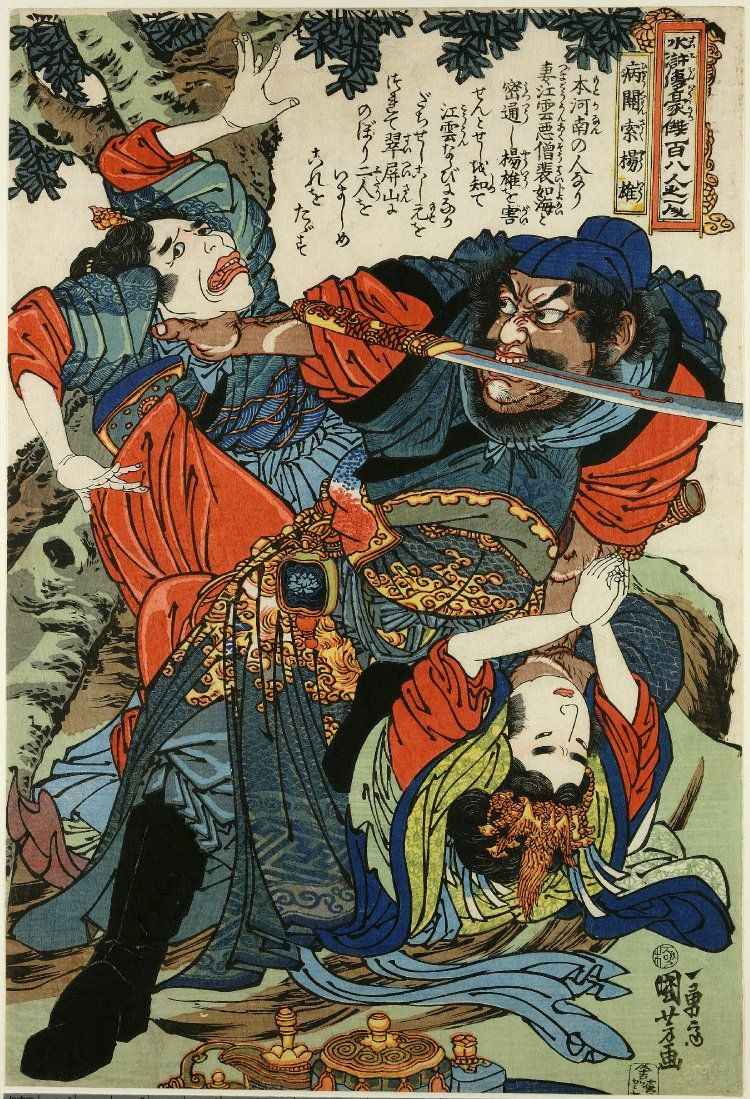
- an illustration of Yang Xiong killing Pan Qiaoyun and Ying'er by Utagawa Kuniyoshi
- First appearance: Chapter 44

In-universe information
- Nicknames: "Sick (Note: 病, which means "sick", is a homonym of 並, which means "to be comparable or equivalent to". Yang Xiong's nickname can thus be understood to mean "Equivalent/Comparable to Guan Suo".) Guan Suo" 病關索
- Weapon: podao
- Origin: prison warden and executioner
- Designation: Infantry Commander of Liangshan
- Rank: 32nd, Secure Star (天牢星) of the 36 Heavenly Spirits
- Ancestral home / Place of origin: Henan

Chinese names
- Simplified Chinese: 杨雄
- Traditional Chinese: 楊雄
- Pinyin: Yáng Xióng
- Wade–Giles: Yang Hsiung

Yang Xiong is a fictional character in Water Margin, one of the Classic Chinese Novels. Nicknamed "Sick Guan Suo", he ranks 32nd among the 36 Heavenly Spirits, the first third of the 108 Heroes.

== Background ==
The novel describes Yang Xiong as a good-looking man with a fair complexion, thick eyebrows, eyes like those of a fenghuang, a sparse beard, and floral tattoos all over his body. He is nicknamed "Sick Guan Suo" as he resembles Guan Suo in appearance.

A highly-skilled fighter originally from Henan, Yang Xiong works as a prison warden and executioner in Jizhou (薊州; present-day Jizhou, Tianjin).

== Meeting Shi Xiu ==
Yang Xiong is first introduced in the novel when he is walking through the streets, receiving congratulatory gifts from people after executing a murderer. A group of hooligans, jealous of him, ambushes and attacks him.

Shi Xiu, who happens to be passing by, rushes to Yang Xiong's aid and helps him fend off the hooligans, who flee when they realise they are no match for the two men. Grateful to Shi Xiu for saving him, Yang Xiong becomes sworn brothers with Shi Xiu and invites him to live in his residence and help him run a butcher stall.

During his stay in the Yang residence, Shi Xiu discovers that his sworn brother's wife, Pan Qiaoyun, is having an affair with a Buddhist monk, Pei Ruhai.

Yang Xiong, after learning about the affair from Shi Xiu, confronts Pan Qiaoyun. However, she turns the tables by accusing Shi Xiu of making sexual advances on her. Yang Xiong, taken in by his wife's lies, severs ties with Shi Xiu and kicks him out of the house.

== Killing his unfaithful wife ==
Determined to reveal the truth, Shi Xiu ambushes Pei Ruhai one night shortly after he leaves the Yang residence and kills him. He then takes the monk's robe and other personal effects, and shows them to Yang Xiong, vouching with his life that what he said is true.

The next day, Yang Xiong takes Pan Qiaoyun and their servant Ying'er to the nearby Cuiping Hill (翠屏山) under the pretext of paying respects to his ancestors. On the hill, he confronts his wife again, demanding the truth from her and showing her Pei Ruhai's robe and personal effects. Pan Qiaoyun, seeing that her secret lover is dead, confesses to the affair. At Shi Xiu's instigation, Yang Xiong kills his unfaithful wife and Ying'er, who had abetted her mistress in the affair.

Yang Xiong and Shi Xiu decide to take refuge in the outlaw stronghold at Liangshan Marsh. Shi Qian, who has been hiding and has witnessed the murders, reveals himself and threatens to report them to the authorities if they refuse to take him along to Liangshan. They gladly agree.

== Conflict with the Zhu Family Village ==
En route to Liangshan, the trio stops at a tavern for a meal. During this time, Shi Qian steals a rooster and cooks it for their meal since the place does not serve any palatable food. A fight breaks out when the tavern owner, after accusing Shi Qian of theft, calls for help upon hearing Shi Xiu claim that the three of them are from Liangshan. Unknown to the three men, the tavern is under the protection of the Zhu Family Village, a fortified village run by three brothers and their father who are very hostile towards the Liangshan outlaws. The three men burn down the tavern and flee, with dozens of armed men from the village in pursuit. Shi Qian accidentally stumbles into a trap and gets captured.

Yang Xiong and Shi Xiu escape and take shelter in the nearby Li Family Village, whose master Li Ying is sympathetic towards them. Li Ying then writes to the Zhus, apologising on behalf of the three men for the disturbance, and kindly requesting that the Zhus give him face by freeing Shi Qian. The situation escalates into violence when the Zhus not only turn down Li Ying's request, but also insult him, prompting Li to confront them. Zhu Biao, the youngest of the Zhu brothers, injures Li Ying with an arrow shot, forcing him to retreat. Left with no other option, Yang Xiong and Shi Xiu make their way to Liangshan to seek help.

The Liangshan outlaws, having heard of the Zhus' insults and taunts directed at them, assemble their forces to attack the Zhu Family Village to achieve the twin objectives of rescuing Shi Qian and teaching the arrogant Zhus a lesson. After three assaults, the outlaws defeat the Zhus and overrun the village, saving Shi Qian and their comrades captured by the Zhus. Yang Xiong then officially joins the Liangshan outlaws.

== Campaigns and death ==
Yang Xiong is appointed as a commander of the Liangshan infantry after the 108 Heroes are fully assembled. He participates in the campaigns against the Liao invaders and rebel forces on Song territory after the outlaws receive amnesty from Emperor Huizong.

Although Yang Xiong is one of the few Liangshan heroes who survive all the campaigns, he dies of a tumour on his back on the way back to the capital after the last campaign.

== See also ==
- List of Water Margin minor characters#Yang Xiong's story for a list of supporting minor characters from Yang Xiong's story.
