= Jasmine Zhang =

Chinese talk show host

- 张庆 (Zhang Qing)
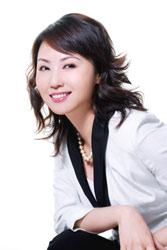
- Qing Zhang, 2007
- Born: March 13, 1978 (age 47); Lan Zhou, China
- Education: M.S. (2011)
- Alma mater: University of Southern California
- Height: 5 ft 7 in (170 cm)

Jasmine Zhang (Chinese: 张庆; pinyin: zhāng qìng; born March 13, 1978) is a Chinese talk show host, producer and businesswoman. Jasmine was the host and producer (since 2006) of Beijing's weekly TV program "Fortune Celebrity" (财智人物) on the economic channel (BTV-5). It is the only interview show on the entire economic channel, and primarily focuses on interviewing successful businessmen from all over the world, as well as government officers related to economics. She was also the host and deputy director of "Beijing Influence" (北京影响力), the economic circle's top awards ceremony in Beijing, China. In addition, she has also hosted many other interview shows; news conferences; forums; and ceremonies. In 2006, she was awarded the title of "Outstanding TV Host", and coined as Headed Figure of BTV-5, due to the success of the 3rd "Beijing Influence Awards". In 2009, Zhang suspended her work and took degree abroad. She received a master's degree in the program of Communication Management at Annenberg School of Communication and Journalism at University of Southern California in 2011.

== Early life ==
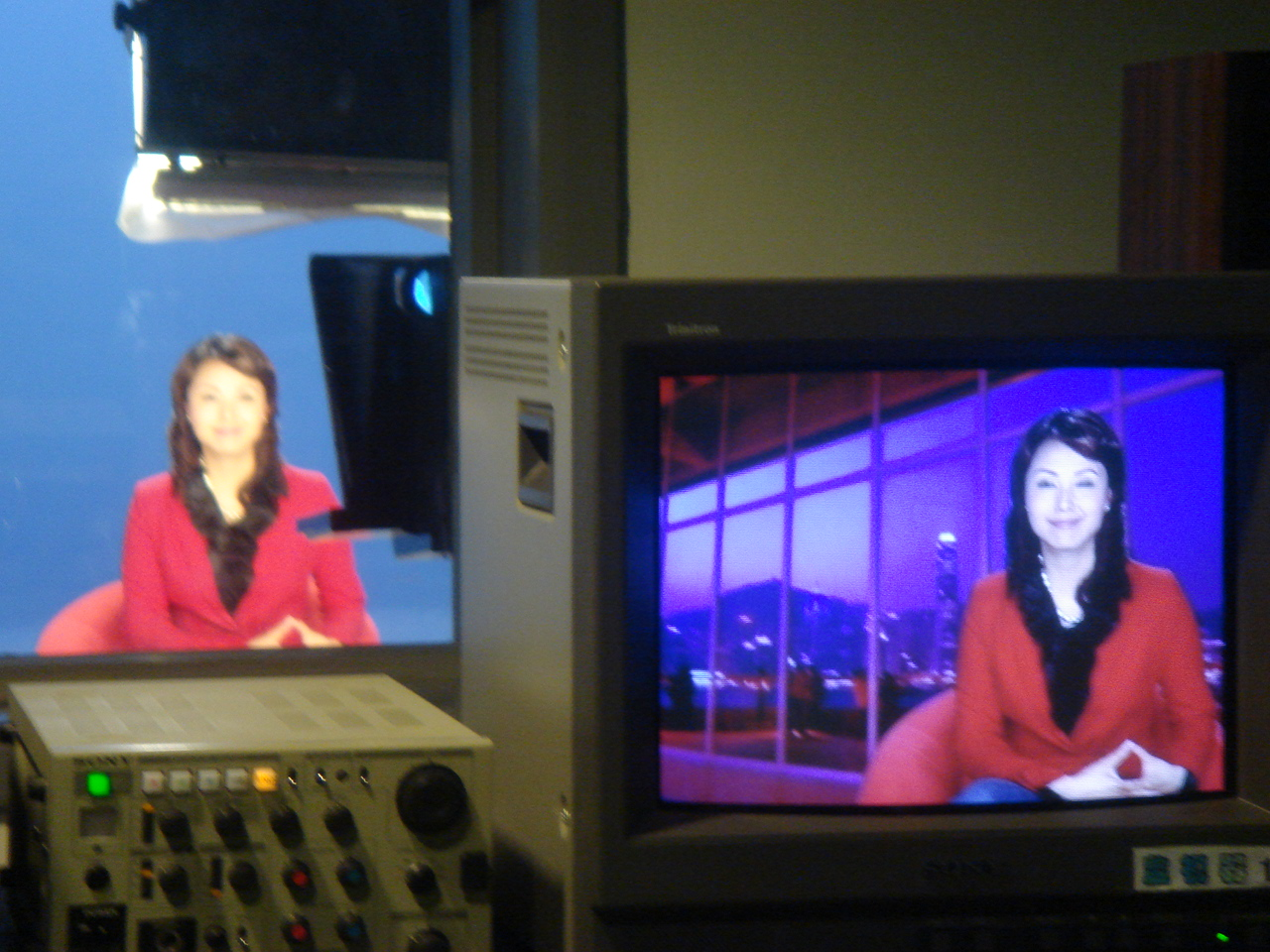
Videotaping

Zhang was born in Lanzhou, China, to Zhang Ziqiang, an engineer in a state running company and his wife Qing Lanying, a doctor in local epidemic/disease control center.

In 1997, when she was 19, she started her first company by recruiting performers from art school, musical school, and model training institutions. After one year in business, she decided to discontinue her business to become a performer. She went to Beijing Film Academy for a one-year precollege study. At that time, she planned to become an actress. Followed by the precollege study, she joined in Dept of TV and Film Arts at Nanjing Art Institute and majored in Performance.

== Career ==
=== TV shows ===
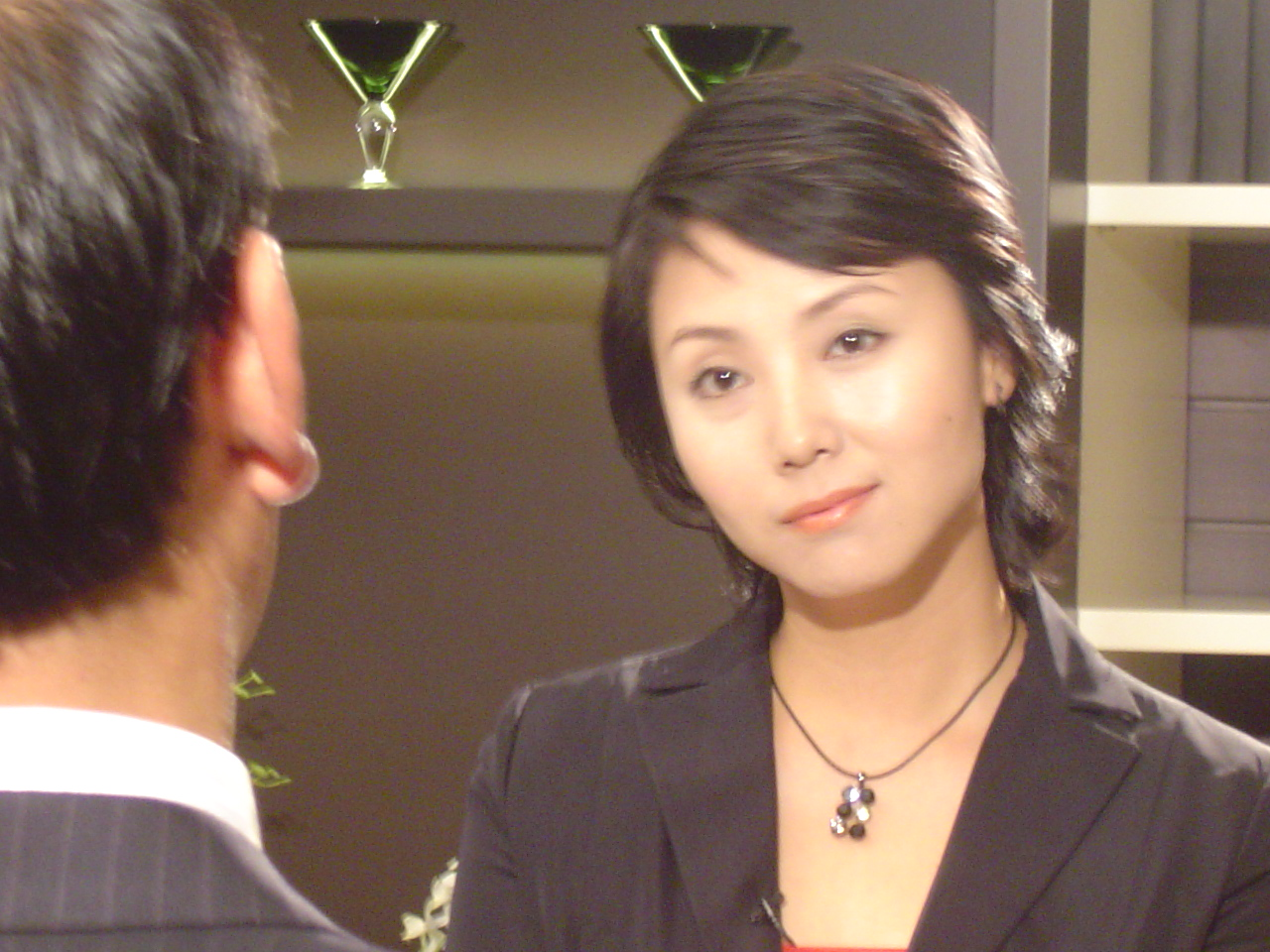
Interviewing

PERIOD	SHOW	POSITION
Jun, 2003 ~ May, 2004	"Travel Guide" <<旅游资讯>>	Newscaster
Jan, 2005 ~ Jun, 2007	"Down, But Not Out” <<白手起家>>	Host
May, 2004 ~ Jan, 2008	"Fortune Celebrity" <<财智人物>>	Host Executive Producer (since Jun, 2006)

=== Forums and Ceremonies ===
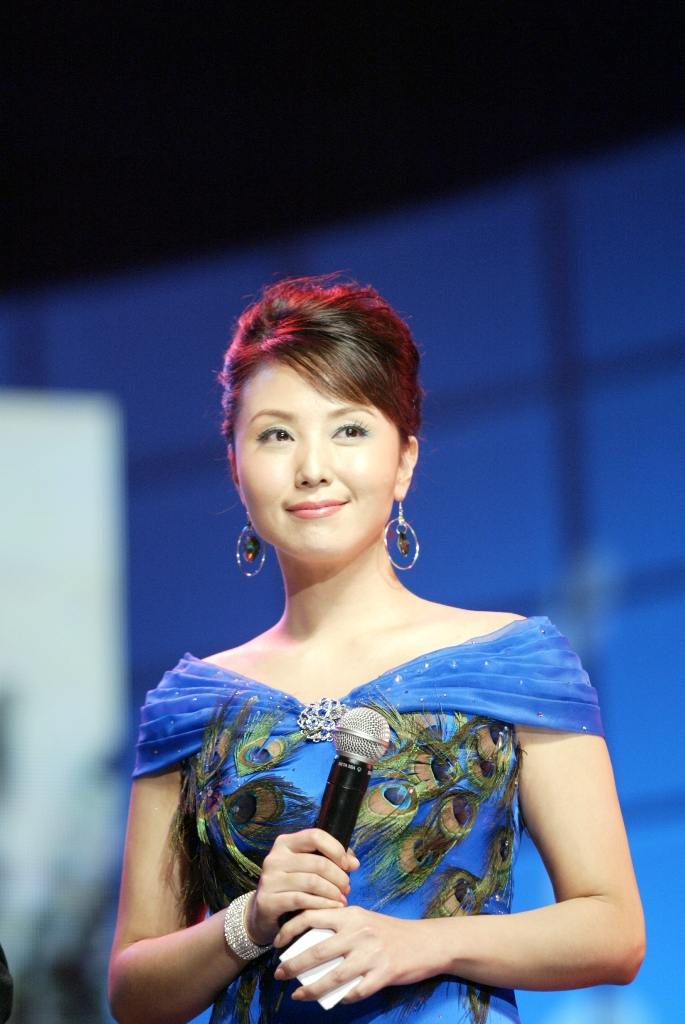
Hosting the 3rd "Beijing Influence Awards" in 2006

PERIOD	SHOW	POSITION
Jun, 2001	Japan MANTUOLIN Concert 日本曼驼铃音乐会	Host
Jan, 2003	New Year's Day Concert "NAXI Ancient Music” 纳西古乐、迎新年音乐会	Host
Aug, 2003	The Arts Evening Party "Wind from Ridge” 八面来风"走进将军岭"文艺晚会	Host
Dec, 2004	The 1st Annual Ceremony "Beijing Influence Award" 第一届北京影响力颁奖典礼	Host
May, 2005	The 4th Annual Ceremony "Top 10 Leaders of National Software Industry Association" 第四届中国软件行业十大领军人物颁奖典礼	Host
Dec, 2005	The 2nd Annual Ceremony "Beijing Influence Award" 第二届《北京影响力》年度颁奖典礼	Host Executive Producer
Dec, 2005	The 1st Mobile Communication & News Media Forum 第一届移动通讯与新媒体论坛	Host
Apr, 2006	The 5th Annual Ceremony "Top 10 Leaders of National Software Industry Association" 第五届中国软件行业十大领军人物颁奖典礼	Host
Sep, 2006	Beijing Influence Summit (Forum) 北京影响力高峰论坛	Presider First Deputy Director
Dec, 2006	The 3rd Annual Ceremony "Beijing Influence Award" 第三届《北京影响力》年度颁奖晚会	Host First Deputy Director
Apr, 2007	CCTV Try-Out Competition for the Host of Variety Shows, Beijing District 中央电视台挑战主持人大赛北京赛区	Host
