= Penglai =

Penglai, Peng Lai, or Peng-lai may refer to:

- Penglai, Shandong, a district in Yantai, Shandong, China
- Penglai, Hainan, a town in Wenchang, Hainan, China
- Penglai, Sichuan, a town in Daying County, Sichuan, China
- Penglai, Fujian, a town in Anxi County, Fujian, China
- Mount Penglai, the island for immortals in Chinese mythology
- Penglai, a 2022 short film produced by Illumination

== See also ==
- Penglai Pagoda in Penglai District, Yantai
- Penglai Pier-2 light rail station
