= Nanchangshan Island =

Island in Shandong, China

Nanchangshan
Native name: 南长山岛
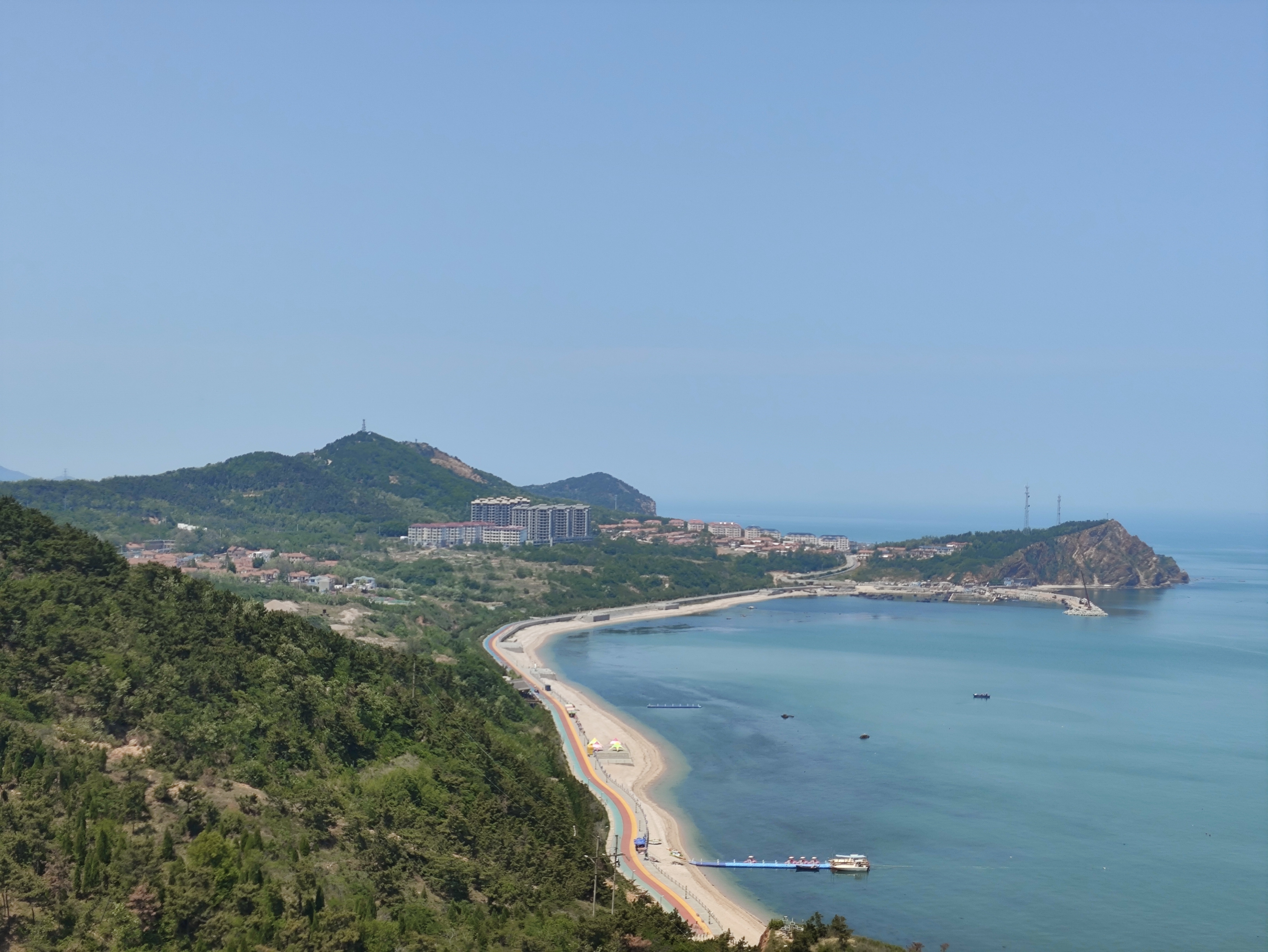
- Zhaowang Bay and Banpi Hill

- Location within Shandong Location within Eastern China Location within China

Geography
- Location: Bohai Sea and Yellow Sea
- Coordinates: 37°55′20″N 120°44′25″E
- Archipelago: Miaodao Islands
- Area: 13.2128 km^{2} (5.1015 sq mi)
- Length: 7.35 km (4.567 mi)
- Width: 3.85 km (2.392 mi)
- Highest elevation: 156.1 m (512.1 ft)
- Highest point: Huangshan Hill

Administration
- China
- Province: Shandong Province
- Prefecture: Yantai
- County: Penglai District
- Subdistrict: Nanchangshan Subdistrict

Demographics
- Population: 24,414 (2010)
- Pop. density: 1,848/km^{2} (4786/sq mi)
- Languages: Jiaoliao Mandarin

Nanchangshan Island or South Changshan Island (Chinese: 南长山岛), historically known as Daxie Island (Chinese: 大谢岛), is an island in the Bohai Strait. Administered by Yantai City, Shandong Province, China, it is the largest and most populous island in Shandong, with over 20000 residents.

Nanchangshan Island is the largest island in both the Changshan Islands, also known as Miaodao Archipelago（Chinese: 庙岛群岛) and Shandong Province. The island has an elongated shape, stretching longer from north to south than east to west. It measures approximately 7.35 km in length (east-west) and 3.85 km in width (north-south), covering an area of 13.2128 km² with a coastline of 24.45 km. The highest point is Huangshan Hill in the central-eastern part of the island, reaching an elevation of 156.1 meters. The terrain is dominated by low hills, with the overall topography sloping from the higher eastern region to the lower western areas.

Nanchangshan Island was formerly under the jurisdiction of Nanchangshan Subdistrict, Changdao County, Yantai City, and served as the seat of Changdao County. In 2019, Changdao County was merged with Penglai City to form Penglai District (Chinese: 蓬莱区), a district of Yantai City.

Archaeological findings on Nanchangshan Island include pottery, bronze artifacts, jade objects, among others. During the Song Dynasty, the imperial government utilized the island and its surrounding archipelago as prison facilities, which held thousands of prisoners at its peak. In August 1949, the island was captured by the People's Liberation Army during a military campaign, marking the CCP's first large-scale cross-sea amphibious assault.
