= Changdao County =

Former county in Shandong, China

Changdao County 长岛县
- County of China
- 1956–2020
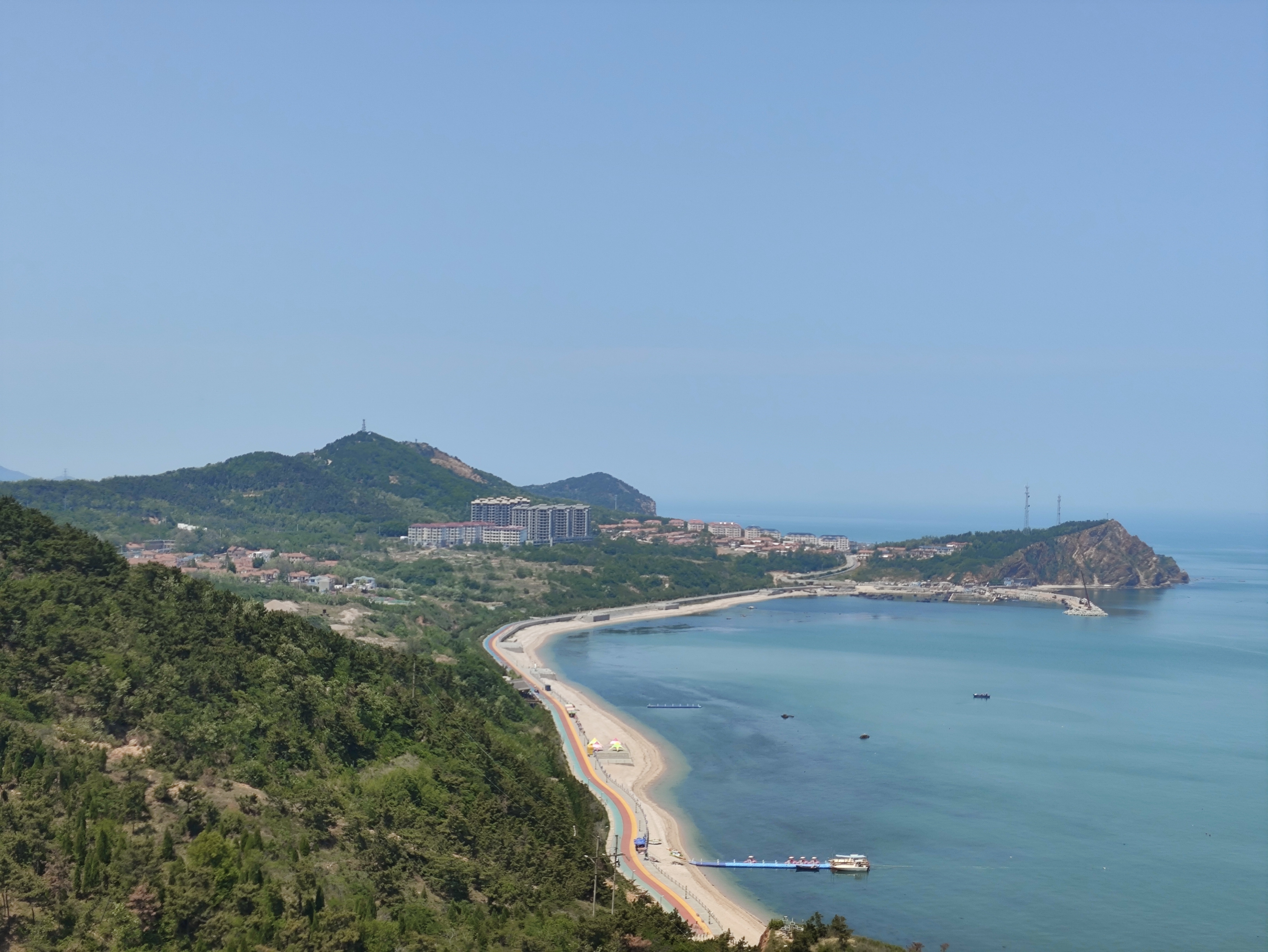
- South Changshan Island

- Location in Shandong
- Area
- 56 km^{2} (22 sq mi)
- History
  - Established: 1956
  - Disestablished: 2020
- Today part of: Penglai District, Yantai

Changdao County (simplified Chinese: 长岛县; traditional Chinese: 長島縣; pinyin: Chángdǎo Xiàn; lit. 'Long Island County') was a county in Yantai, a prefectural area of Shandong in the People's Republic of China. It consisted of the Changshan Islands within the Bohai Strait, directly north of Penglai. They are known for their sandy beaches and picturesque limestone cliffs. The total land area measured 56 square kilometers (22 sq mi) and the coastline 146 km (91 mi). The population in 2020 was 40,898. In 2020, Changdao County was merged into the county-level city of Penglai and became Penglai District.

== Geography ==
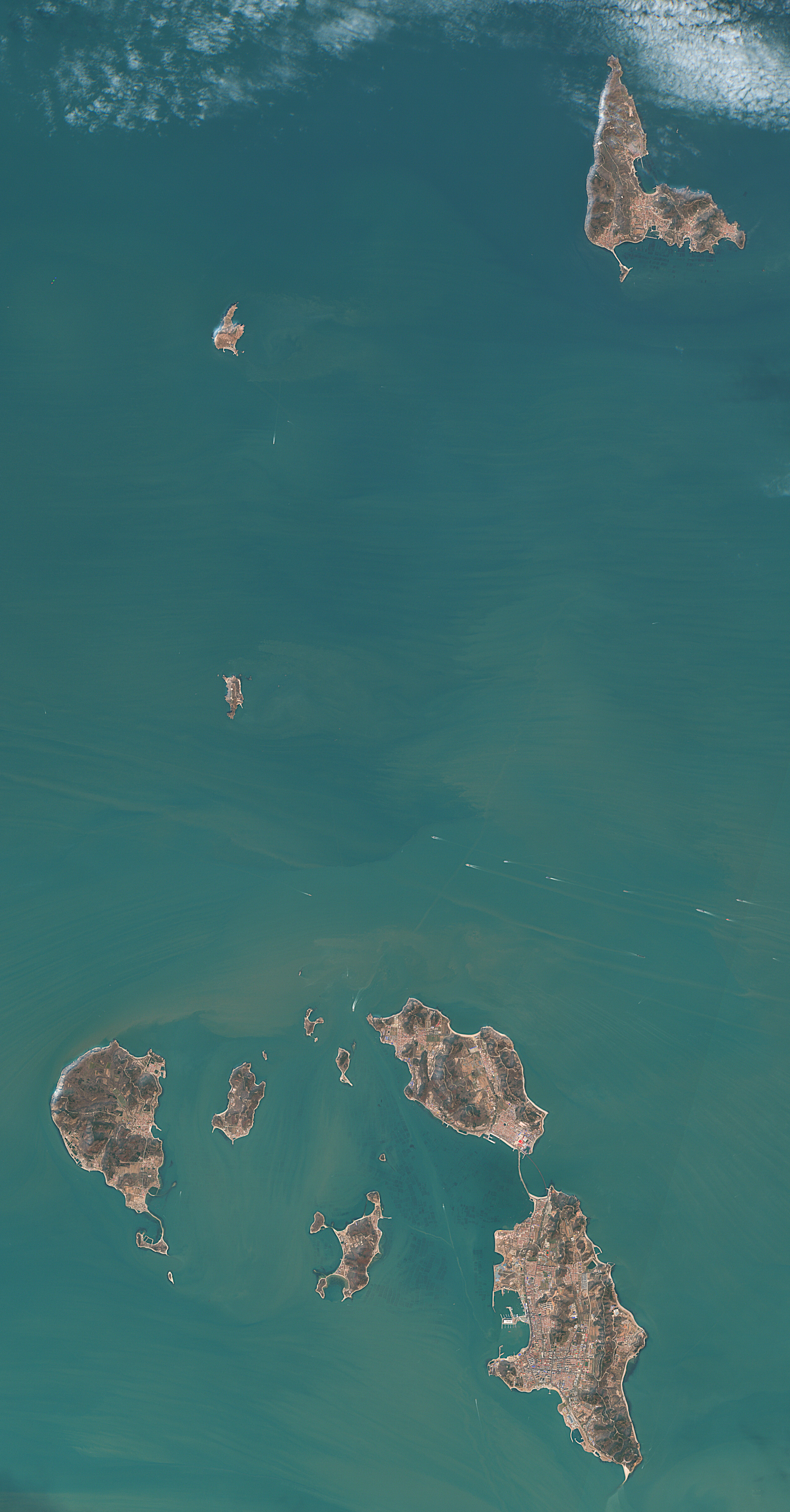
Sentinel-2 view of main Changshan Islands in 2021.

The Changshan Islands (simplified Chinese: 长山列岛; traditional Chinese: 長山列島; pinyin: Chángshān lièdǎo), also known as the Temple Islands or Miaodao Archipelago (庙岛群岛; 廟島群島; Miàodǎo qúndǎo) are an archipelago of 32 islands located across the southern portion of the Bohai Strait, the waterway connecting the Bohai Sea to the Yellow Sea, collectively named after the two largest islands. In Chinese, they are also known as the "Long Islands" (长岛; 長島; Chángdǎo), and anciently as the "Sandy Gate Islands" (沙门岛; 沙門島; Shāmén dǎo).

The islands are located between Jiaodong and Liaodong Peninsula, at the confluence of the Yellow Sea and Bohai Sea. They face Yantai in the south, Dalian in the north, Beijing and Tianjin in the west, and South Korea and Japan across the Yellow Sea in the east.

=== Islands ===
There are 32 islands in the Changshan Islands, 10 of them have permanent residential settlements. These islands were mostly formed by Proterozoic low-grade metamorphic rocks, with smaller amounts of Tertiary igneous rocks and Quaternary sedimentary rocks.

Name	Chinese name	Length (km)	Width (km)	Area (km2)	Shoreline (km)	Maximum elevation (m)
South Changshan Island	南长山岛	7.22	4	12.8	20.02	156.1
North Changshan Island	北长山岛	5.1	2.6	7.87	13.8	195.7
Greater Heishan Island	大黑山岛	4.22	2.7	7.47	12.03	189
Lesser Heishan Island	小黑山岛	1.9	0.85	1.29	5.3	95.1
Miao Island (Temple Island)	庙岛	2.65	1.1	1.43	6.7	98.3
Tuoji Island	砣矶岛	4.75	3.9	7.05	17.68	198.9
Greater Qin Island	大钦岛	4.9	2	6.44	14.55	202.44
Lesser Qin Island	小钦岛	2	0.85	1.11	6.44	148.9
South Huangcheng Island	南隍城岛	3.1	1.6	1.83	12.09	100.9
North Huangcheng Island	北隍城岛	2.85	1.9	2.62	10.32	159.8
Yulin Island (Fish Scales Island)	鱼鳞岛	0.17	0.1	0.01	0.38	19.5
South Tuozi Island	南砣子岛	0.86	0.4	0.138	2.31	15.1
Niutuozi Island (Ox Rocky Island)	牛砣子岛	0.55	0.35	0.11	1.38	26.4
Yangtuozi Island (Goat Rocky Island)	羊砣子岛	0.55	0.35	0.11	1.38	26.4
Shaobing Island (Pancake Island)	烧饼岛	0.14	0.1	0.02	0.38	19.6
Lijupa Island	犁犋把岛	0.19	0.08	0.01	0.4	22.4
Xie Island (Scorpins Island)	蝎岛	0.1	0.045	0.004	0.21	9.8
Houji Island	猴矶岛	1.1	0.47	0.28	2.75	92.9
Lesser Houji Island	小猴矶岛	0.04	0.025	0.0009	0.22	23.3
Gaoshan Island	高山岛	1.3	0.7	0.46	3.55	202.8
Lesser Gaoshan Island	小高山岛	0.035	0.025	0.0008	0.22	12.6
Greater Zhushan Island	大竹山岛	2.1	1.2	1.49	5.2	194.5
Lesser Zhushan Island	小竹山岛	0.8	0.4	0.24	2	97.2
Cheyou Island	车由岛	0.64	0.1	0.05	1.25	73.5
Tuozi Island	砣子岛	0.42	0.15	0.05	1.06	60.3
Dongzuishi Island	东嘴石岛	0.05	0.04	0.002	0.15	7.2
Shanzuishi Island	山嘴石岛	0.065	0.02	0.0013	0.17	16.7
Biegaishan Island (Turtle Shell Mount Island)	鳖盖山岛	0.2	0.11	0.02	0.57	42.8
Pojiao Island	坡礁岛	0.085	0.02	0.0017	0.15	12
Tanglang Island (Mantis Island)	螳螂岛	0.97	0.25	0.15	2.01	54.7
Danglang Island (Wave Breaking Island)	挡浪岛	0.5	0.4	0.13	1.86	35.9
Maqiangshi Island	马枪石岛	0.1	0.016	0.0015	0.14	8.9

== Climate ==
Changdao County is a warm temperate monsoon continental climate with moderate rainfall, moist air and mild climate. The average annual temperature is 11.9°C, and the average annual precipitation is 560 mm.

Climate data for Changdao, elevation 40 m (130 ft), (1991–2020 normals, extremes 1981–present)
Month	Jan	Feb	Mar	Apr	May	Jun	Jul	Aug	Sep	Oct	Nov	Dec	Year
Record high °C (°F)	12.4 (54.3)	20.4 (68.7)	22.2 (72.0)	29.9 (85.8)	33.4 (92.1)	36.7 (98.1)	36.1 (97.0)	36.3 (97.3)	31.3 (88.3)	28.9 (84.0)	23.7 (74.7)	15.8 (60.4)	36.7 (98.1)
Mean daily maximum °C (°F)	2.0 (35.6)	4.0 (39.2)	9.1 (48.4)	16.0 (60.8)	21.7 (71.1)	25.8 (78.4)	28.1 (82.6)	28.0 (82.4)	24.9 (76.8)	19.2 (66.6)	11.6 (52.9)	4.8 (40.6)	16.3 (61.3)
Daily mean °C (°F)	−0.6 (30.9)	0.7 (33.3)	5.1 (41.2)	11.3 (52.3)	17.0 (62.6)	21.4 (70.5)	24.4 (75.9)	24.8 (76.6)	21.8 (71.2)	16.0 (60.8)	8.7 (47.7)	2.2 (36.0)	12.7 (54.9)
Mean daily minimum °C (°F)	−2.7 (27.1)	−1.7 (28.9)	2.2 (36.0)	7.6 (45.7)	13.3 (55.9)	17.8 (64.0)	21.6 (70.9)	22.5 (72.5)	19.4 (66.9)	13.5 (56.3)	6.3 (43.3)	0.0 (32.0)	10.0 (50.0)
Record low °C (°F)	−11.4 (11.5)	−12.7 (9.1)	−6.6 (20.1)	0.7 (33.3)	4.1 (39.4)	10.2 (50.4)	15.4 (59.7)	17.3 (63.1)	9.0 (48.2)	0.7 (33.3)	−5.0 (23.0)	−8.7 (16.3)	−12.7 (9.1)
Average precipitation mm (inches)	7.7 (0.30)	10.7 (0.42)	11.5 (0.45)	28.0 (1.10)	48.3 (1.90)	63.1 (2.48)	144.2 (5.68)	147.9 (5.82)	46.5 (1.83)	26.1 (1.03)	23.6 (0.93)	11.5 (0.45)	569.1 (22.39)
Average precipitation days (≥ 0.1 mm)	3.9	3.0	3.0	5.0	6.7	7.2	9.5	8.6	5.7	5.9	5.1	5.1	68.7
Average snowy days	7.2	4.3	1.4	0.2	0	0	0	0	0	0.1	2.1	7.4	22.7
Average relative humidity (%)	65	65	62	62	67	74	84	84	73	65	64	64	69
Mean monthly sunshine hours	172.5	183.9	239.4	253.8	271.6	253.3	224.9	235.3	233.3	217.3	168.4	158	2,611.7
Percentage possible sunshine	56	60	64	64	62	57	50	56	63	63	56	54	59
Source: China Meteorological Administrationall-time August record

== Demographics ==
Ten of the islands are occupied, and there are twenty-two uninhabited islands, some little more than sand spits. There is one large town, Tuoji Town (砣矶镇, population 8,495) and seven smaller towns with forty villages, with a total population in the county of 52,000.

At the end of 2020, Changdao County had 15,082 registered households and 40,898 registered population, including 21,944 urban population, 213 births and 284 deaths. The birth rate is 5.18‰, the death rate is 6.91‰, and the natural growth rate is -1.73‰.

== Administrative divisions ==
Changdao County had jurisdiction over one subdistrict, one town and six townships:

- Nanchangshan Subdistrict 南长山街道 (South Changshan Subdistrict)
- Tuoji Town 砣矶镇
- Beichangshan Township 北长山乡 (North Chang Mountain Township)
- Heishan Township 黑山乡 (Black Mountain Township)
- Daqindao Township 大钦岛乡 (Greater Qin Island Township)
- Xiaoqindao Township 小钦岛乡 (Lesser Qin Island Township)
- Nanhuangcheng Township 南隍城乡 (South Huangcheng Township)
- Beihuangcheng Township 北隍城乡 (North Huangcheng Township)

== Economy ==
The major occupation of the islands is aquaculture, producing products such as sea cucumbers, abalone, sea urchins, bivalves, kelp, scallops, prawns and fish. Tourism is also important; many of the villages sport resort hotels.

In 2020, the regional GDP of Changdao County will reach 744.597 million RMB, a decrease of 1.4% over 2019 in terms of comparable prices, and the added value of the primary industry will reach 478.123 million RMB, an increase of 6.4% over 2019. The added value of the secondary industry was 296.8 million RMB, an increase of 1.5% over 2019; The added value of the tertiary industry was 236.794 million RMB, down 12.2% from 2019. The composition of the three industries is 64.2:4.0:31.8. The per capita GDP is 195,947 RMB.

== Transportation ==
The islands are regularly served by both a passenger and vehicle roll-on/roll-off ferry from Penglai. There was a small military airport on the largest island, South Changshan Island.

=== Roads ===
By 2015, the mileage of Changdao County was 141.8 kilometers, and the density of the road network was 2.2 kilometers per square kilometer.

=== Waterways ===
As of 2013, Changdao County had 13 transportation ports and 21 port berths. There were 52 transport vessels with an annual cargo throughput of 3.8 million tons and more than 2.6 million passengers. There are 14 waterways in the territory, including 3 international waterways, and more than 300 large passenger and cargo ships pass by every day, which is the only place for domestic and foreign ships to travel to and from Tianjin, Beijing, Hebei, Liaoning and other regions.

== Tourism ==
Both Changdao National Forest Park and Changdao National Nature Reserve are located on the islands, which were on a cross-Bohai Sea flyway.

Temple Island (庙岛; 廟島; Miàodǎo) got its name from the large number of temples that were built there. Xianying Palace is a temple that was built during the Northern Song dynasty, starting in 1122. It was originally a Taoist temple to the sea goddess Matsu, but became Buddhist later. At the present time the local government has restored the temple to its Ming dynasty appearance, although many additions had been made during the Qing.

Changdao Island was previously closed to non-Chinese nationals. Foreigners found on the island were swiftly taken to the passenger ferry terminal and placed on the next ferry back to Penglai by the islands police service. Islanders promptly reported all "outsiders" to the islands police service. Police explained the reasons for this was due to the high number of military installations on the Island. The Changdao Islands are now open to non-Chinese nationals. This was agreed by the local and national governments as of 1 December 2008.

== City honor ==
On November 10, 2018, it won the award of "2018 China's Top Ten Tourism Demonstration Counties and Cities".

On May 18, 2019, it was selected into the "2019 China's Most Beautiful County List".

The third batch of "clear water and green mountains are Jinshan and silver mountains" practice and innovation base.

On July 29, 2020, it was selected into the list of reconfirmed national health towns in 2019.

In October 2021, it was selected into the list of 100 "Hospitable Shandong Internet Celebrities".
