= Dengzhou (disambiguation) =

Dengzhou (邓州) is a county-level city in Henan, China.

Dengzhou may also refer to:

- Dengzhou, a former name of Penglai in Shandong, China
  - Deng Prefecture (登州), a prefecture between the 6th and 14th centuries around modern Penglai, Shandong, China
  - Dengzhou Subdistrict (登州街道), a subdistrict of Penglai, Shandong, China
- Deng Prefecture (鄧州), a prefecture between the 6th and 20th centuries in modern Henan, China

== See also ==
- Deng (disambiguation)
