= Nanyang Commandery =

Chinese commandery that existed from the Warring States period to the Tang dynasty

Nanyang Commandery (Chinese: 南陽郡) was a Chinese commandery that existed from the Warring States period to Tang dynasty. It was centered in present-day Nanyang, Henan.

== History ==
Nanyang Commandery was established by Qin in the 35th year of King Zhao (272 BC). The seat was Wan (宛), present-day Nanyang, Henan. It consisted of the land north of the Han River previously conquered from Chu.

In the Western Han dynasty, the commandery consisted of 36 counties: Wan, Chou (犨), Duyan (杜衍), Zan (酇), Yuyang (育陽), Boshan (博山), Nieyang (涅陽), Yin (陰), Duyang (堵陽), Zhi (雉), Shandu (山都), Caiyang (蔡陽), Xinye (新野), Zhuyang (筑陽), Jiyang (棘陽), Wudang (武當), Wuyin (舞陰), Xi'e (西鄂), Rang (穰), Li (酈), Anzhong (安眾), Guanjun (冠軍), Biyang (比陽), Pingshi (平氏), Sui (隨), She (葉), Deng (鄧), Chaoyang (朝陽), Luyang (魯陽), Chongling (舂陵), Xindu (新都), Huyang (湖陽), Hongyang (紅陽), Lecheng (樂成), Bowang (博望), and Fuyang (復陽). The total population in 2 AD was 1,942,051, in 359,116 households. By 140 AD, the population had grown to 2,439,618, in 528,551 households.

During the Three Kingdoms era, multiple new commanderies were established. By the time when Jin dynasty reunited China (280 AD), the number of counties in Nanyang had been reduced to 14, namely Wan, Xi'e, Zhi, Luyang, Chou, Yuyang, Bowang, Duyang, She, Wuyin, Biyang, Nieyang, Guanjun and Li. The recorded population was 24,400 households. In Liu Song dynasty, only 7 counties remained in the commandery, while the population had decreased further to 38,132 individuals in 4,727 households by mid-5th century.

In Sui and Tang dynasties, Nanyang Commandery became an alternative name of Deng Prefecture in the same region. In 742, the commandery administered 6 counties, and had a population of 165,257, in 43,055 households.
