= Deng Prefecture (Henan) =

Historical administrative division in Henan, China

- Traditional Chinese: 鄧州
- Simplified Chinese: 邓州
Transcriptions
Standard Mandarin
- Hanyu Pinyin: Dèng Zhōu
- Wade–Giles: Teng^{4} Chou^{1}

Deng Prefecture was a prefecture in imperial China surrounding modern Dengzhou in Henan, China. It existed intermittently from 587 to 1913. The modern city Dengzhou, created in 1988, retains the name of its former seat.

== Geography ==
The administrative region of Deng Prefecture in the Tang dynasty is in southern Henan, under the administration of Nanyang. It probably includes parts of modern:

- Nanyang
- Dengzhou
- Xinye County
- Neixiang County
- Xixia County
- Xichuan County
- Zhenping County
- Nanzhao County

== See also ==
- Other Dengzhous
- Nanyang Commandery
