= Penglai Pavilion =

Tower in Shandong, China

Coordinates: 37.829989°N 120.750732°E

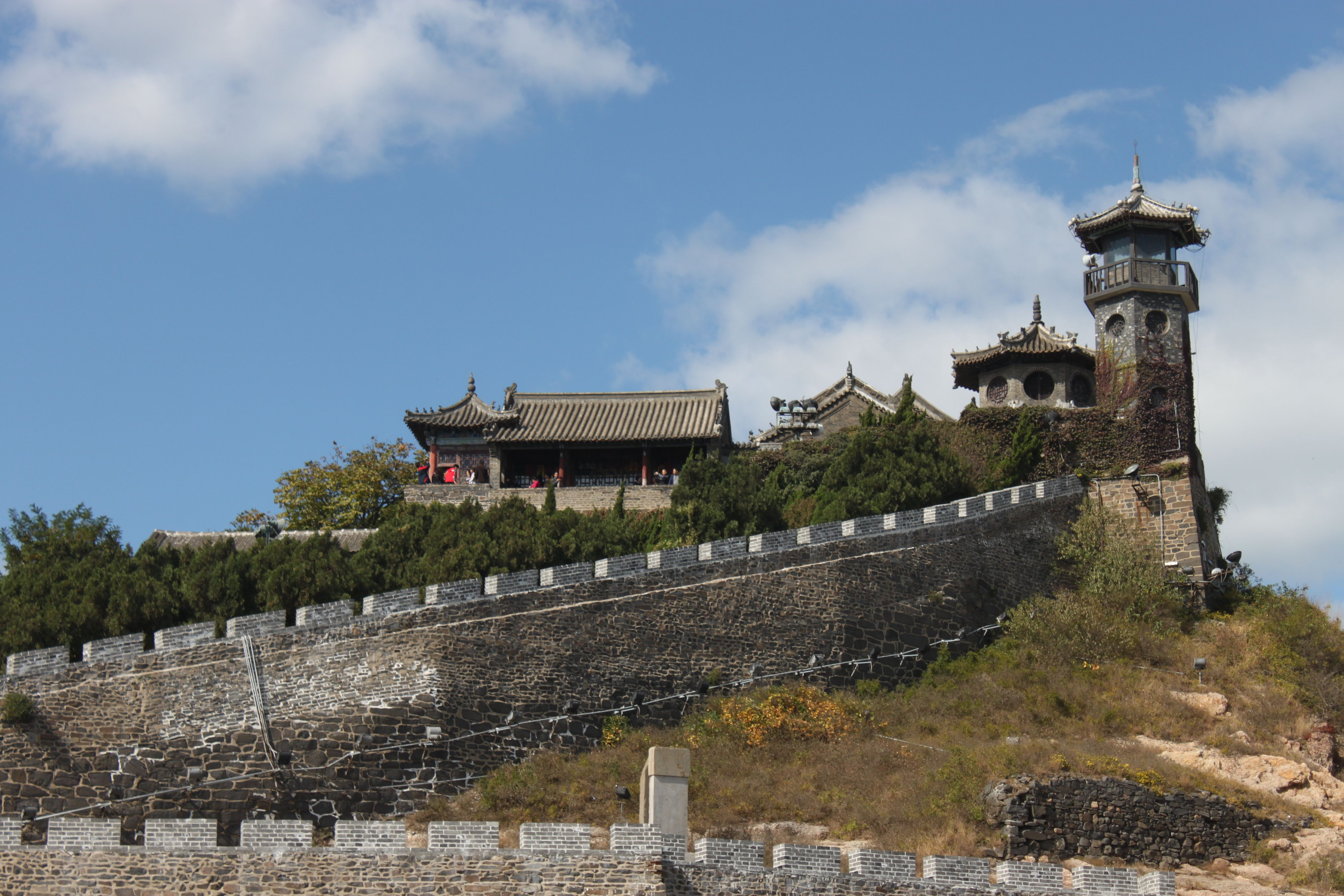
Penglai Pavilion, as seen up close and from the nearby beach

Penglai Pavilion or Penglai Pagoda (simplified Chinese: 蓬莱阁; traditional Chinese: 蓬萊閣; pinyin: Pénglái Gé) is a famous tower in Penglai, Yantai, Shandong. It is noted as one of the Four Great Towers of China, although it is occasionally not listed due to lacking a famous literary piece associated with it. It is known as the landing place of the Eight Immortals and famous for its occasional mirages. The dividing line between the Yellow Sea and Bohai Sea is also marked and clearly visible from the area. The corresponding tourism area is classified as a AAAAA scenic area by the China National Tourism Administration.

Many people, like poet Su Shi, general Qi Jiguang, and warlord Zhang Zongchang, all wrote poems about the pavilion's beauty.

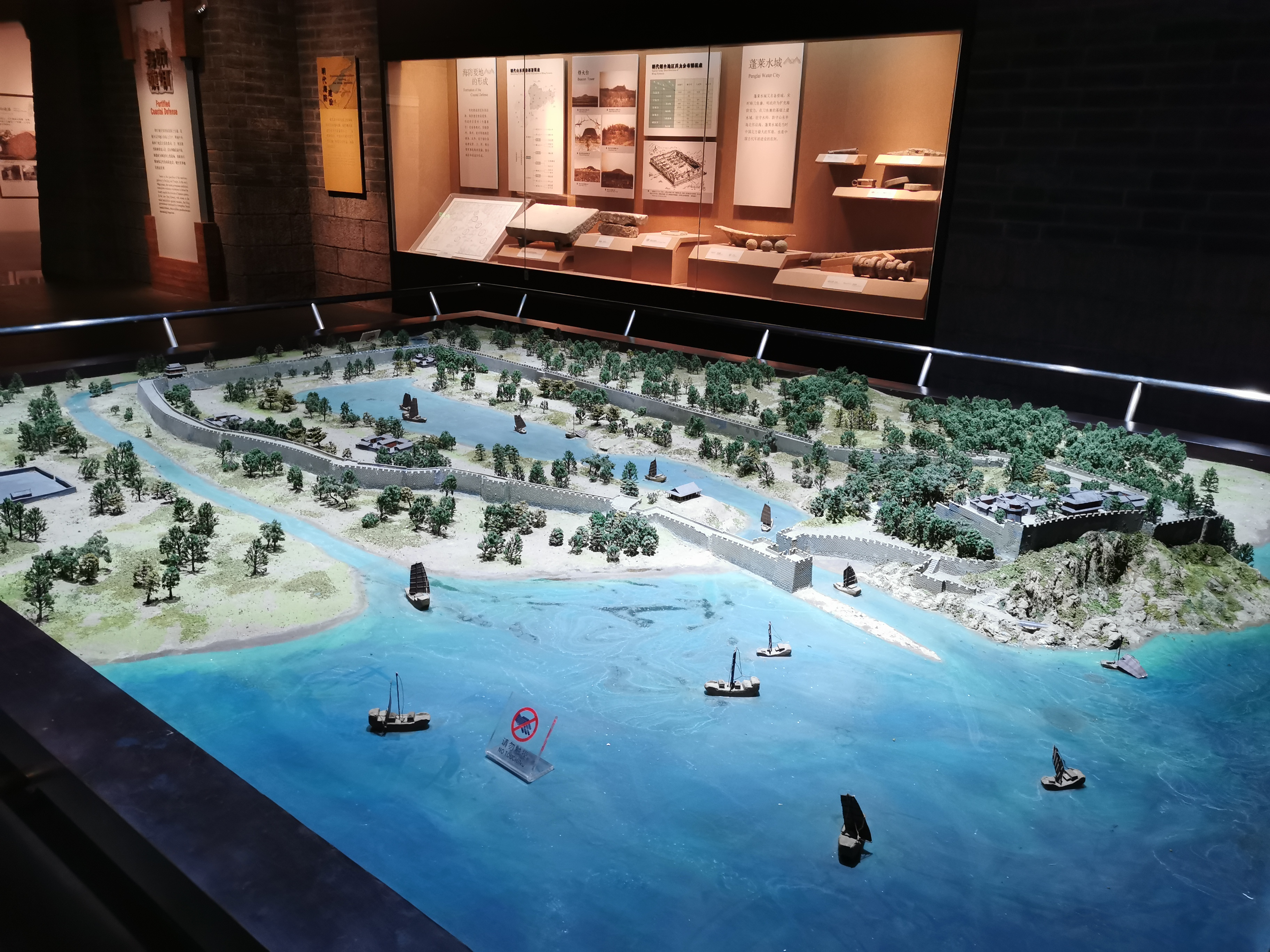
Penglai Pavilion is part of Dengzhou water fort

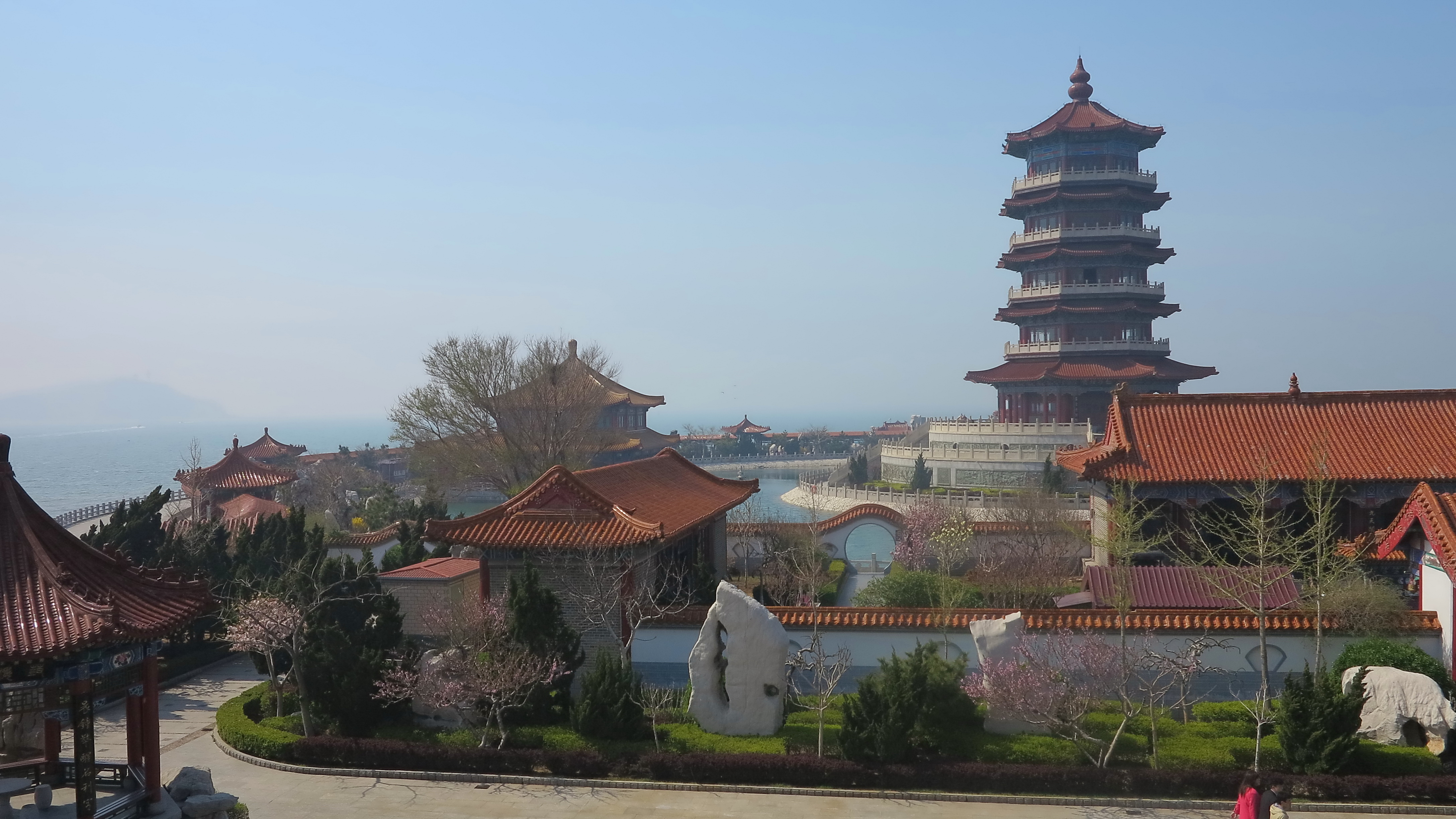
Eight Immortals Park

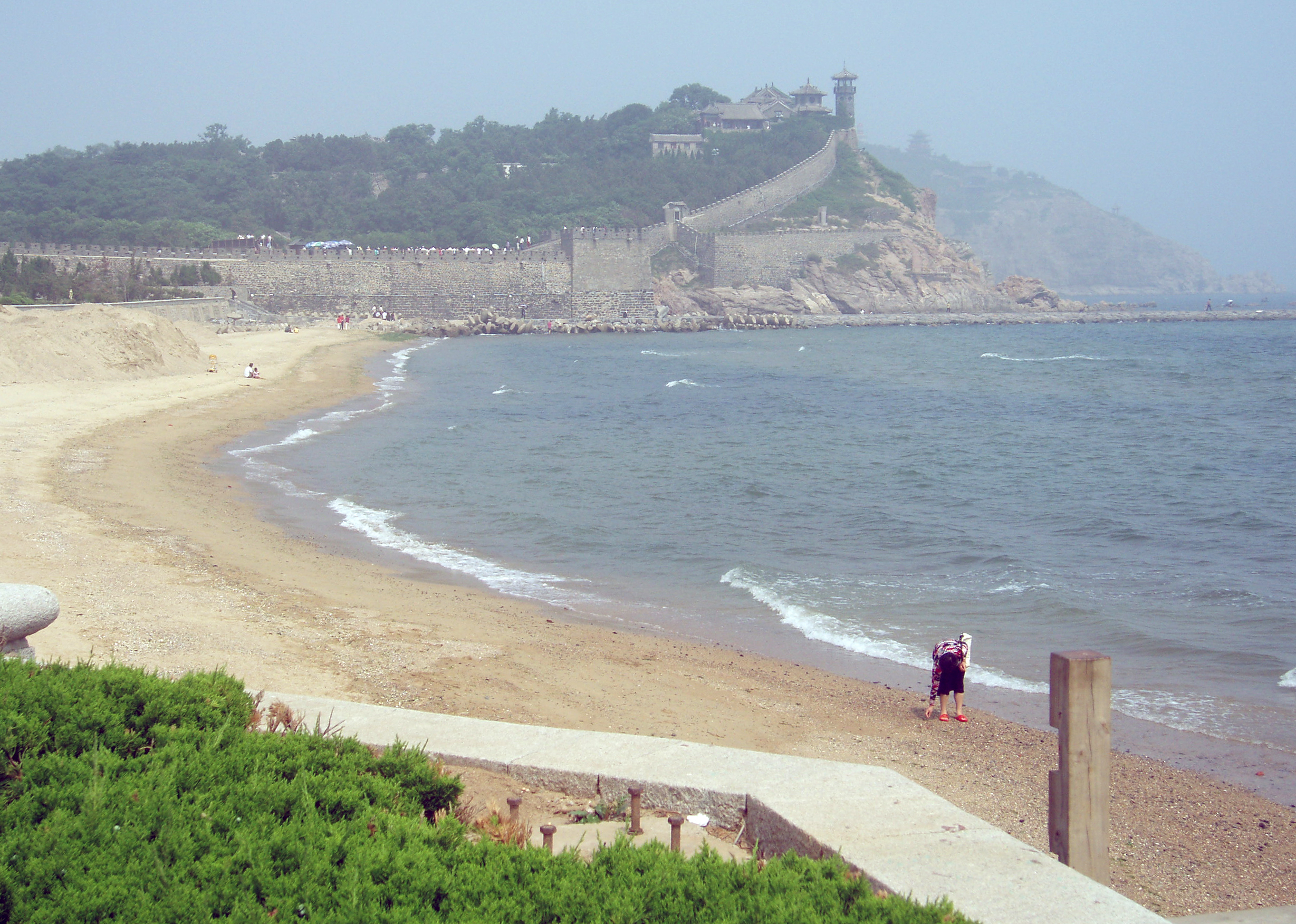
Sea near the pavilion
