= Penglai, Yantai =

Penglai 蓬莱区
- District
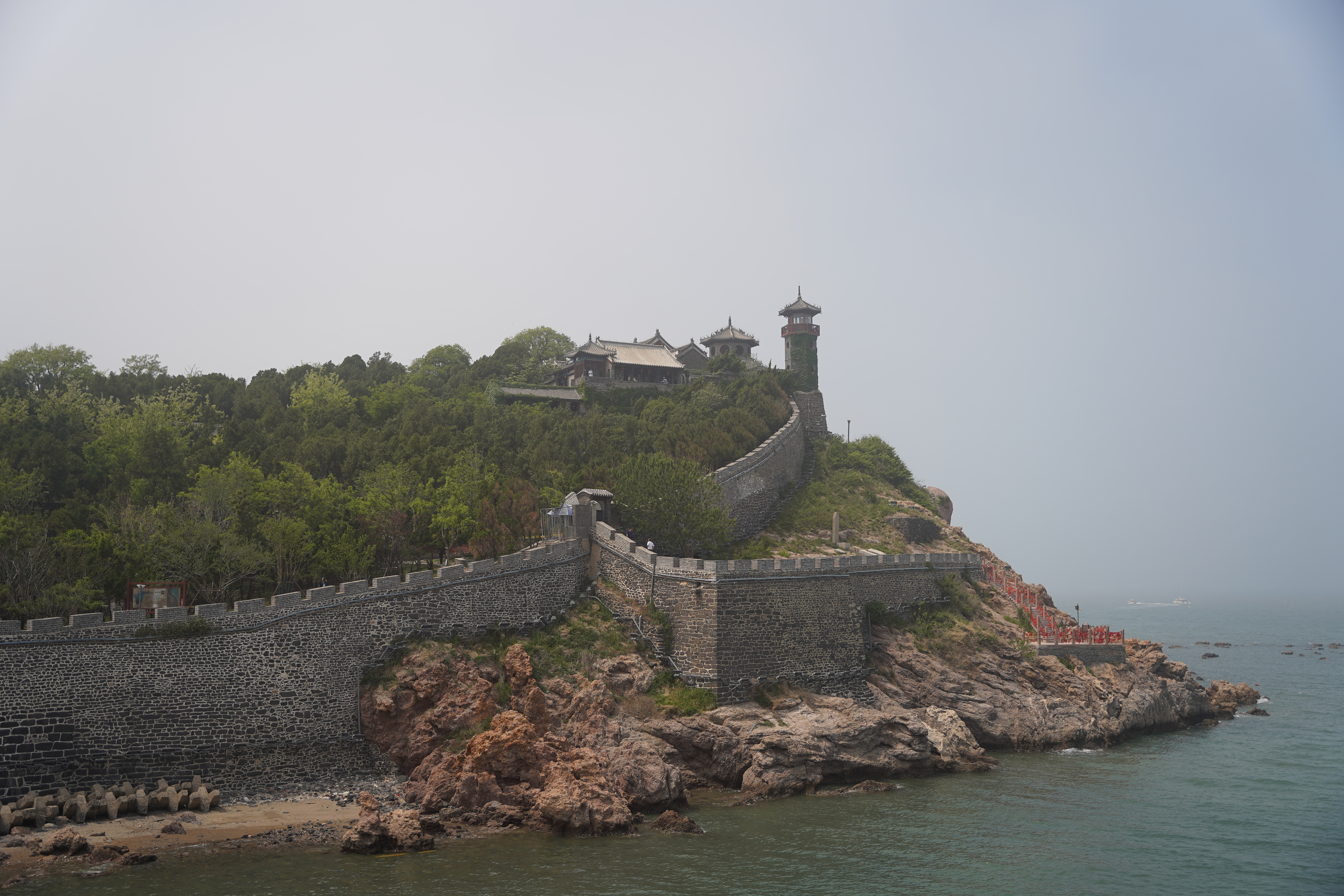
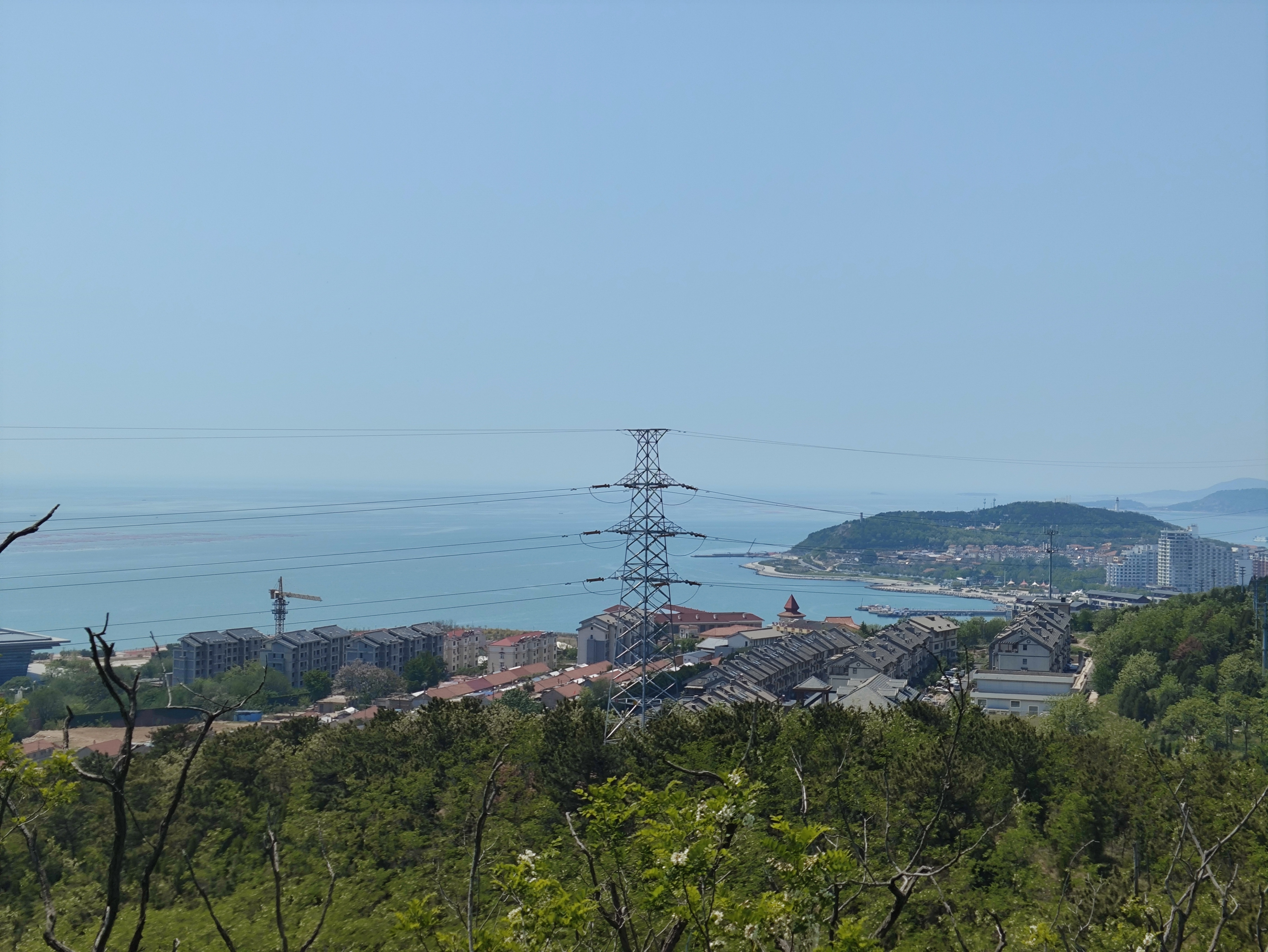
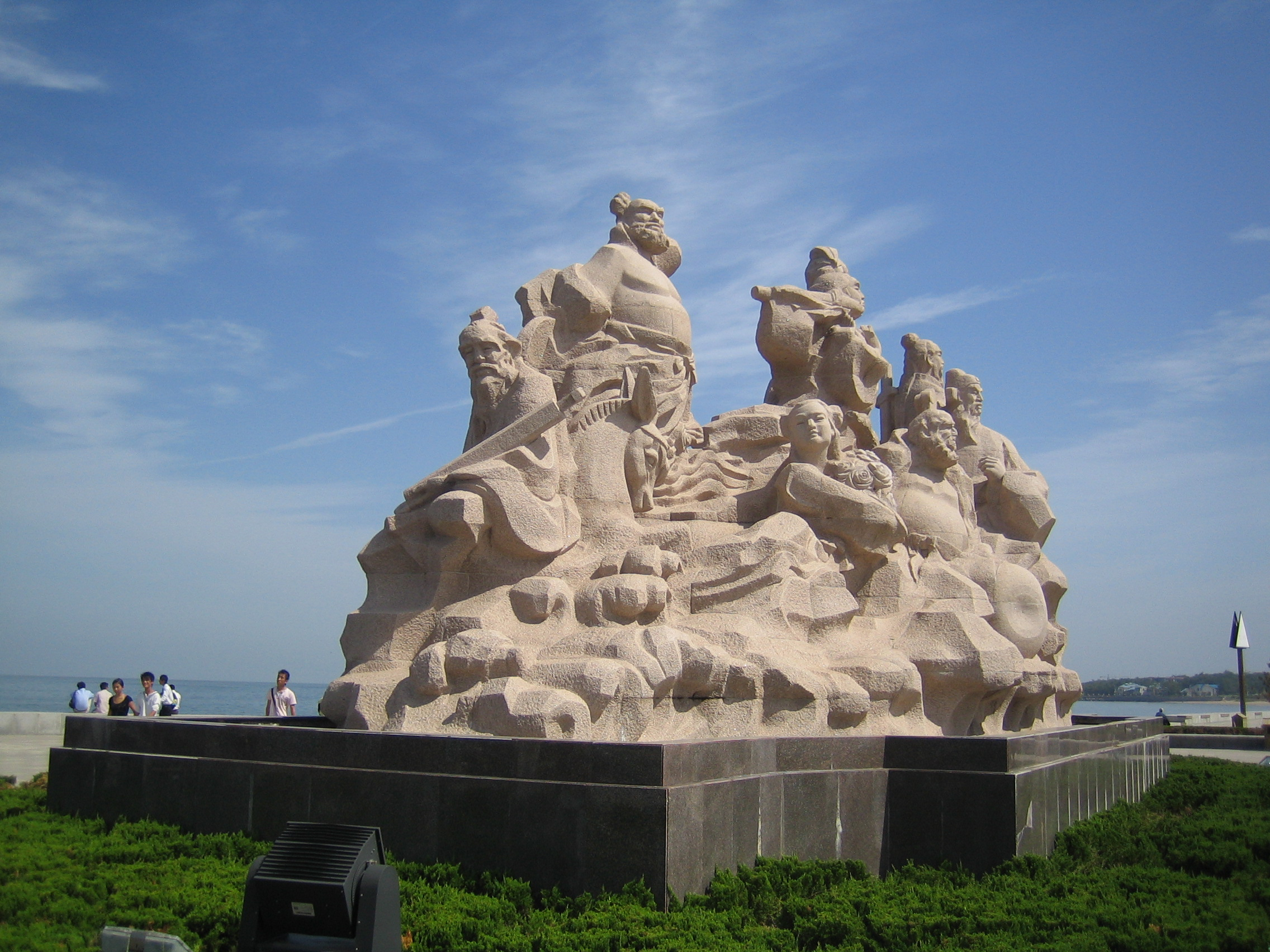
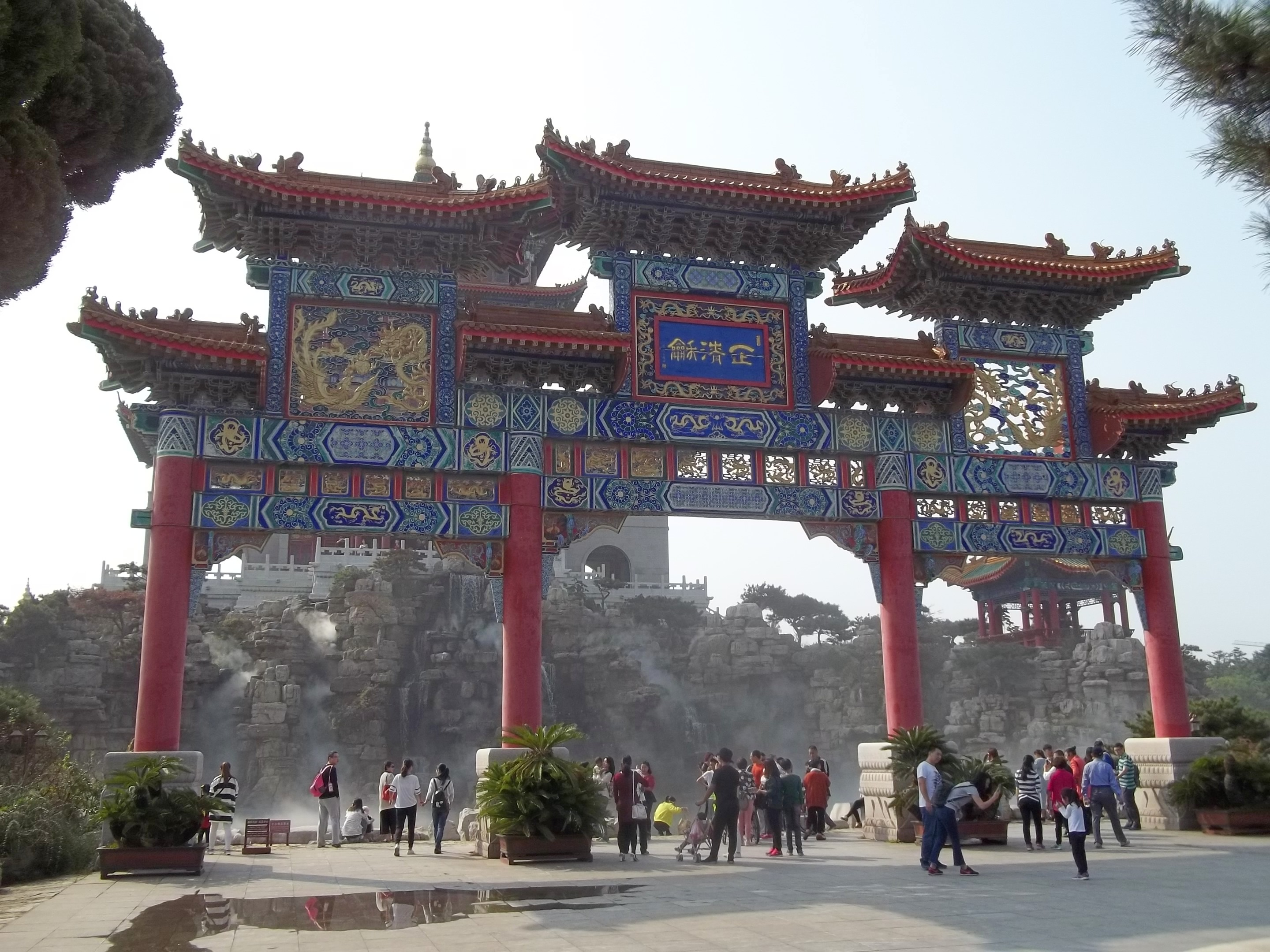
- Penglai Pavilion Changshan Islands Eight Immortals statue City Park

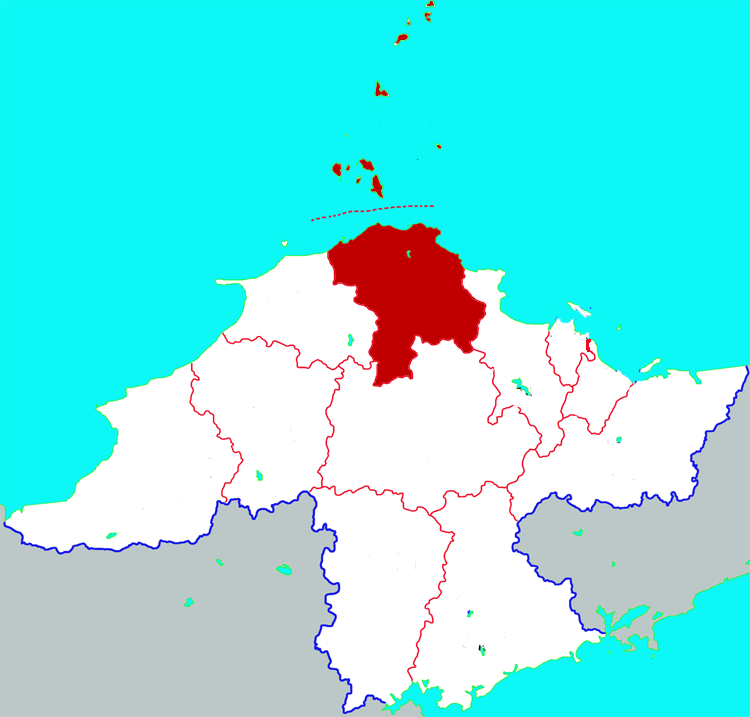
- Location in Yantai

- Location in Shandong
- Coordinates: 37°49′N 120°44′E
- Country: People's Republic of China
- Province: Shandong
- Prefecture-level city: Yantai

Area
  - Total: 1,197.1 km^{2} (462.2 sq mi)

Population (2020)
  - Total: 410,000
  - Density: 340/km^{2} (890/sq mi)
- Time zone: UTC+08:00 (China Standard)
- Postal code: 265600
- Area code: 0535
- Website: penglai.gov.cn

Penglai
- Simplified Chinese: 蓬莱
- Traditional Chinese: 蓬萊
Transcriptions
Standard Mandarin
- Hanyu Pinyin: Pénglái
- Wade–Giles: Pʻeng^{2}-lai^{2}
Yue: Cantonese
- Jyutping: pung^{4}loi^{4}

Former names

Dengzhou
- Chinese: 登州
- Postal: Tengchow
Transcriptions
Standard Mandarin
- Hanyu Pinyin: Dēngzhōu
- Wade–Giles: Teng^{1}-chou^{1}
Yue: Cantonese
- Jyutping: dang^{1}zau^{1}

Penglai, formerly known as Dengzhou or Tengchow, (Note: Other variant spellings include Tang-chow, Tang-chow-foo, Têng-chow, and Têng-chow-fu.) is a district of Yantai City, Shandong Peninsula in the People's Republic of China. It lies on the northwest corner of the Shandong Peninsula on the southern coast of the Gulf of Bohai. Penglai is famous for its mirages out at sea, which are frequent during May and June. Formerly a county-level city under Yantai's administration, Penglai became a district in 2020.

== Geography ==
Penglai District is entirely surrounded by other divisions of Yantai: Fushan District is to the east, Longkou City to the west, and Qixia City to the south. Its limits in geographic coordinates are 37° 25'–37° 50' N, 120° 35'–121° 09' E.

== Climate ==
Penglai District is located in the mid-latitude region of the northern hemisphere, with a continental climate in the warm temperate monsoon zone, annual average temperature of 12.9 °C (55.2 °F), annual average daily maximum temperature of 17.1 °C (62.8 °F), annual average daily minimum temperature of 9.3 °C (48.7 °F), extreme minimum temperature of −15.0 °C (5.0 °F), annual average precipitation of 619.2 mm (24.38 in), annual average sunshine of 2,628.6 hours, frost-free period of 206 days on average, relative humidity 64%, average annual wind speed 5.2 m/s (17 ft/s), no floods, not affected by typhoons.

Climate data for Penglai, elevation 61 m (200 ft), (1991–2020 normals, extremes 1958–present)
Month	Jan	Feb	Mar	Apr	May	Jun	Jul	Aug	Sep	Oct	Nov	Dec	Year
Record high °C (°F)	15.1 (59.2)	20.9 (69.6)	28.8 (83.8)	34.8 (94.6)	37.0 (98.6)	40.9 (105.6)	39.8 (103.6)	41.8 (107.2)	34.6 (94.3)	31.2 (88.2)	29.6 (85.3)	19.0 (66.2)	41.8 (107.2)
Mean daily maximum °C (°F)	2.1 (35.8)	4.6 (40.3)	10.4 (50.7)	17.8 (64.0)	23.7 (74.7)	27.4 (81.3)	29.3 (84.7)	28.7 (83.7)	25.2 (77.4)	19.4 (66.9)	11.8 (53.2)	4.8 (40.6)	17.1 (62.8)
Daily mean °C (°F)	−1.2 (29.8)	0.5 (32.9)	5.5 (41.9)	12.3 (54.1)	18.3 (64.9)	22.5 (72.5)	25.3 (77.5)	25.0 (77.0)	21.3 (70.3)	15.3 (59.5)	8.0 (46.4)	1.4 (34.5)	12.9 (55.1)
Mean daily minimum °C (°F)	−4.0 (24.8)	−2.7 (27.1)	1.6 (34.9)	7.8 (46.0)	13.7 (56.7)	18.3 (64.9)	21.9 (71.4)	22.0 (71.6)	17.8 (64.0)	11.7 (53.1)	4.7 (40.5)	−1.4 (29.5)	9.3 (48.7)
Record low °C (°F)	−14.0 (6.8)	−15.1 (4.8)	−10.0 (14.0)	−5.0 (23.0)	2.0 (35.6)	9.3 (48.7)	12.2 (54.0)	14.0 (57.2)	8.5 (47.3)	1.2 (34.2)	−8.7 (16.3)	−12.3 (9.9)	−15.1 (4.8)
Average precipitation mm (inches)	8.9 (0.35)	12.7 (0.50)	14.4 (0.57)	31.7 (1.25)	54.5 (2.15)	75.8 (2.98)	150.5 (5.93)	147.4 (5.80)	52.7 (2.07)	27.7 (1.09)	28.0 (1.10)	14.9 (0.59)	619.2 (24.38)
Average precipitation days (≥ 0.1 mm)	5.0	4.0	3.8	5.4	7.3	7.8	10.4	9.7	6.4	5.9	6.2	6.8	78.7
Average snowy days	8.9	5.1	1.8	0.2	0	0	0	0	0	0.2	2.9	8.6	27.7
Average relative humidity (%)	61	59	54	53	57	67	77	80	70	62	61	61	64
Mean monthly sunshine hours	172.5	182.5	241.0	253.7	278.9	259.5	230.4	235.3	231.0	220.4	171.8	151.6	2,628.6
Percentage possible sunshine	56	59	65	64	63	59	52	56	63	64	57	51	59
Source: China Meteorological Administration

== History ==
The Red Cliffs (丹崖) of the area are reputed to have been the site where the Eight Immortals set out for the land of the immortals and where Emperor Qin later allegedly sent off a thousand men and girls on ships to search for them. One legend claims that a mystic dolphin was seen from the cliffs above and, missing it with his spear, the emperor knew that his days were numbered. The Emperor Wu of Han (Hàn Wǔdì) later also visited the area while searching for the elixir of immortality.

The old city walls incorporate guard towers of three stories (rather than the usual two) because the uncle of the first emperor of the 6th-century Sui dynasty had been prince of the area. Under the Ming dynasty, the harbor was fortified and used by the war ships of the Imperial Chinese Navy.

Yantai city became one of the first ports open to all foreigners on the Shandong Peninsula through Penglai in 1858. Christian missions were quickly established. The harbor was found inadequate for the traders, however, and Zhifu (now central Yantai) was developed 30 miles (48 km) away to function as Yantai city's port.

In 2020, Changdao County, consisting of the Changdao Islands in the Bohai Strait, was merged into Penglai.

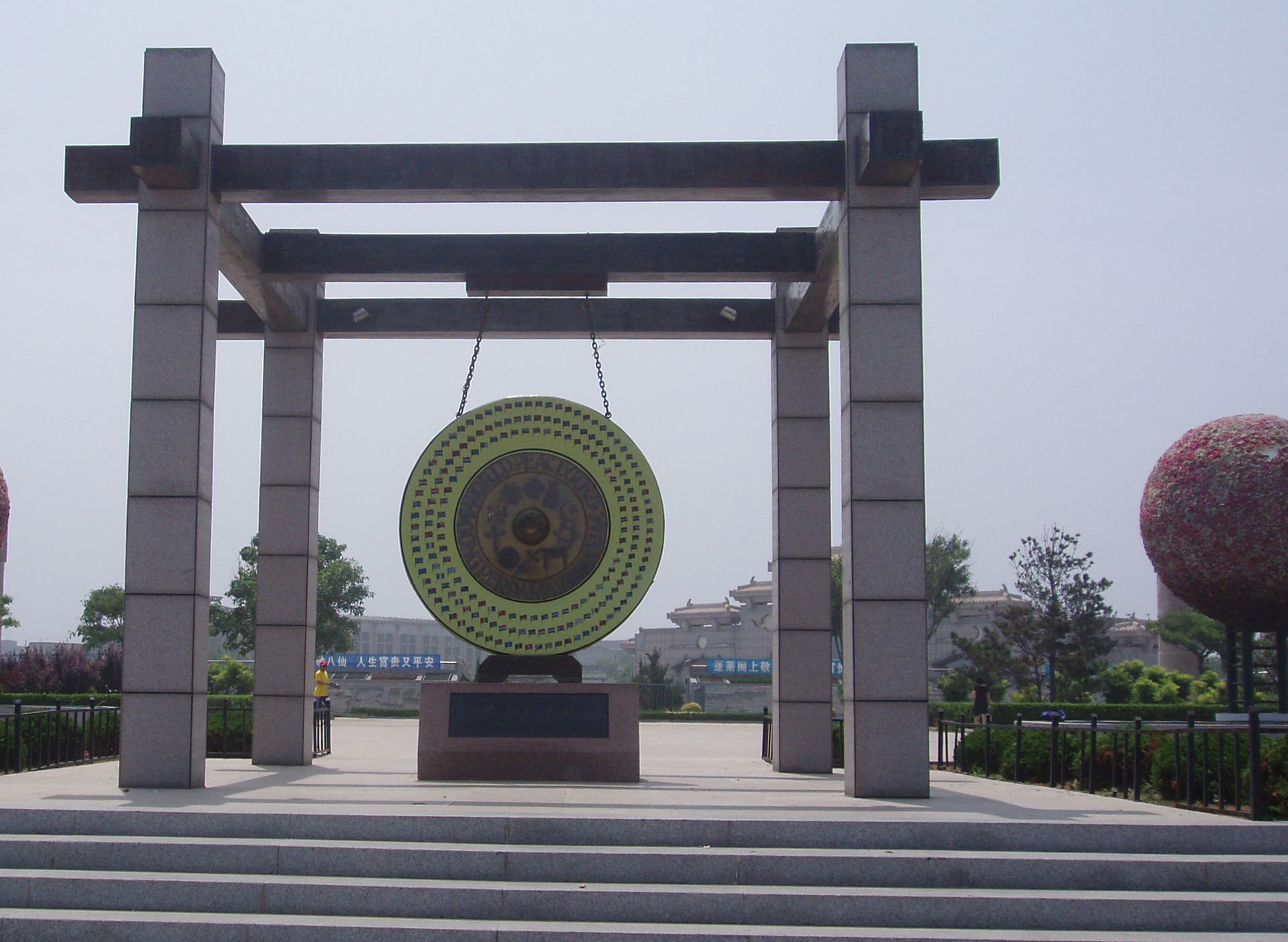
Penglai City Park

== Administrative divisions ==
As of July 2020, Penglai District has 6 streets, 8 towns and 6 townships: Dengzhou Sub-district, Zijingshan Sub-district, Xingang Sub-district, Penglaiguo Sub-district, Nanwang Sub-district, Nanchangshan Sub-district, Liujiagou Town, Chaoshui Town, Daliuxing Town, Xiaomenjia Town, Daxindian Town, Muriji Town, Beigou Town, Emery Town, North Changshan Township, Daqindao Township, Heihe Township, Xiaoqindao Township, Nanhuangcheng Township, Beihuangcheng Township, the district people's government is located in Penglai Economic Development Zone, No. 169 Jinchuang Road.

== Economy ==
- In 2020, Penglai District achieved a gross regional product of 37.04 billion yuan, an increase of 3.3% over the previous year at comparable prices. Among them, the value added of the primary industry is 5.19 billion yuan, up 2.1%; the value added of the secondary industry is 12.20 billion yuan, up 5.7%; the value added of the tertiary industry is 19.65 billion yuan, up 1.9%. The ratio of the three industrial structures was 14.0:32.9:53.1.
- In 2020, Penglai District realized public budget revenue of 3.402 billion yuan, up 3.1% year-on-year; public budget expenditure of 4.368 billion yuan, up 5.3%. Realize tax revenue of 3.49 billion yuan, an increase of -3.0% year-on-year.

=== Tourism ===
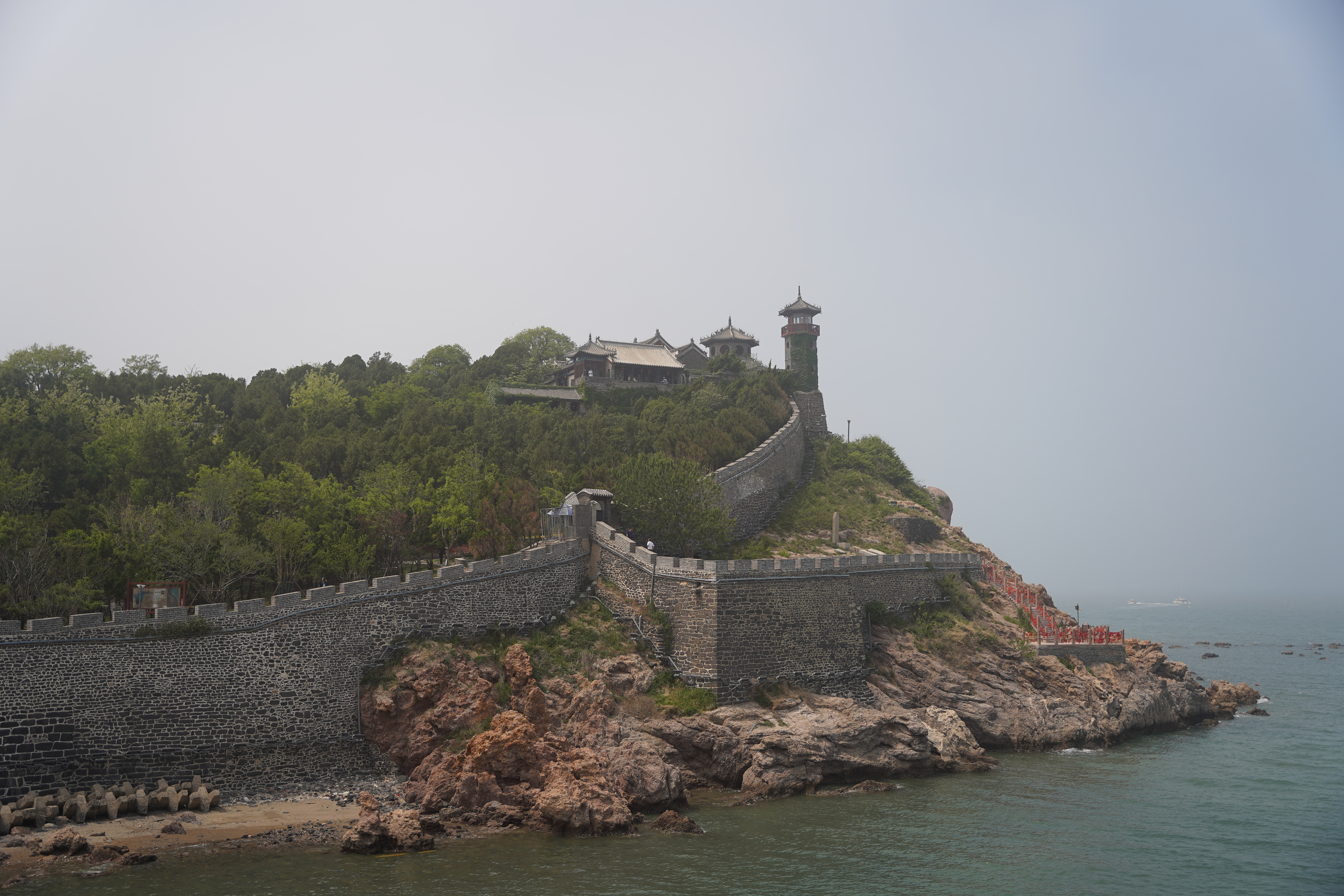
Penglai Pavilion, a Song dynasty complex ranked among the Four Great Towers of China in literary tradition

Penglai has been ranked by the Chinese government as a top domestic tourist destination. Its Water Fortress (水城, Shuǐchéng), a fortified harbor, is one of China's oldest military ports. It was built under the Ming in 1376 and housed a fleet of warjunks. It is now a protected historical monument being renovated at a cost of 500m RMB (more than $60m). There is a plank walk along the cliffs nearby.

More than US$25 million has also been invested into developing the Penglai Pavilion and other sites. The Penglai Pavilion is a large park of ancient buildings, palaces and temples, that have been restored and rebuilt. It has been a tourist goal for more than a thousand years, and the site features inscriptions from famous poets and calligraphers like Su Shi and Dong Qichang. Among other cultural attractions of Penglai are the Naval Museum with exhibits of ancient ships and the restored residence of the famous patriotic general Qi Jiguang. Penglai also has the largest ocean aquarium in Asia. It includes a polar area, a shark hall, a tropical rainforest, and a theater with mermaids, dolphins and sea lions. A picturesque festival takes place in January for the birthday of Tianhou, a local sea goddess.

While tourism is the mainstay of Penglai's economy, bringing more than two million tourists annually, in fact the entire center of the town around the harbour was walled off and completely razed in 2006.

=== Wine industry ===
The production of wine is the second largest industry in the province. Agriculture is first. However, in Penglai, tourism is the primary industry, and wine-making is second. The hills south of Penglai have an average elevation of 200 metres (660 ft), while the coastal areas are relatively flat. Most of the soil is loose, well-aerated, and rich in minerals and organic matters that enable full development of the root systems. The wineries are located mainly in the Nanwang Grape Valley and along the Yan-Peng Sightseeing Highway. The main varieties grown there, like Cabernet Sauvignon, Cabernet Gernischt, Merlot, Riesling and Chardonnay, are all reaching 20 years of age, considered to be the golden stage for these grapes. Most of them maintain an average sugar content of above 20%. The Cabernet is especially typical, with good color and a dense fragrance.

== Notable residents ==
- Qi Jiguang (戚继光, 1528–1588) - Ming dynasty general and national hero who fought Japanese pirates
- Henry Luce (1898–1967) - born in Penglai, founder of TIME, Fortune, and Life.
- Ida Pruitt (1888–1985) - born in Penglai, spoke fluent Chinese, prolific writer on China
- Wu Peifu (吴佩孚, 1874–1939) - army general, later became one of the most powerful military rulers in China during the Warlord Era (1916–1928)
- Meng Xuenong (simplified Chinese: 孟学农; traditional Chinese: 孟學農; pinyin: Mèng Xuénóng born 1949) - vice-governor and acting governor of Shanxi (as of 2007) and disgraced former Mayor of Beijing Municipality

== Honors ==
- In 2018, Penglai was reconfirmed as a national sanitary city (district) by the review.
- In June 2020, Penglai District was selected as one of the "Top 100 Most Bookish Counties and Cities in China in 2020", and in December, Penglai District was selected as one of the "Second Batch of National Territorial Tourism Demonstration Areas", and on December 30, Penglai District was selected as one of the "advanced counties (cities and districts) in Shandong Province for the sixth session of the ideological and moral construction of minors.
- In December 2021, the Department of Culture and Tourism of Shandong Province, the Development and Reform Commission of Shandong Province and the Department of Finance of Shandong Province awarded the title of "the first batch of provincial cultural and tourism consumption pilot counties (cities and districts)". In the same month, Penglai District was selected as the sixth batch of demonstration counties (cities and districts) in the country to take the lead in the basic realization of full mechanization of major crop production.
- In May 2022, the Department of Agriculture and Rural Affairs of Shandong Province and the Department of Finance of Shandong Province jointly issued the Notice on the Identification of the Second Batch of Provincial Modern Agricultural Industrial Parks (Lu Fa Gui Zi [2022] No. 10), and Fushan District and Penglai District of the city were successfully identified as provincial modern agricultural industrial parks. On June 26, it was selected as the list of strong counties of cultural tourism and recreation in Shandong Province in 2021.
- In February 2023, it was recognized as the first batch of demonstration counties (municipalities) for natural resource conservation and efficiency.

== See also ==
- Other Penglais
- Other Dengzhous
