= Water Margin =

One of the Chinese Classic Novels

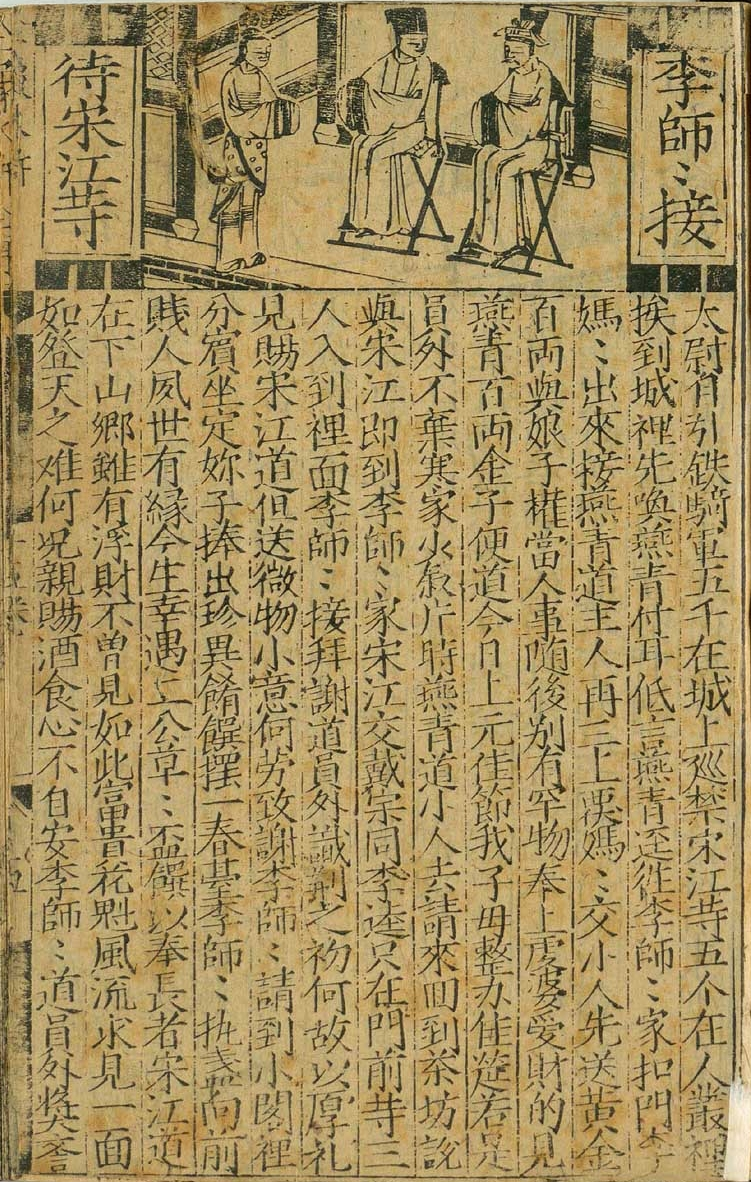
- A page from a block-printed version of the novel Water Margin, brought to Copenhagen, Denmark in the early part of the 17th-century
- Author: Shi Nai'an (subject to academic debate)
- Translator: J. H. Jackson, Pearl S. Buck, Sidney Shapiro, Alex and John Dent-Young
- Language: Written vernacular Chinese
- Genre: Historical fiction
- Set in: Mount Liang, 12th century AD
- Publication date: Prototypes c. 1400; first extant complete printed edition in 1589
- Publication place: China
- English publication date: 71- and 100-chapter version: 1980; 120-chapter version: 1994–2002; 71-chapter version: 2010
- Dewey Decimal: 895.1346
- Original text: Water Margin at Chinese Wikisource

Water Margin
- "Water Margin" in Traditional (top) and Simplified (bottom) Chinese characters
- Traditional Chinese: 水滸傳
- Simplified Chinese: 水浒传
- Literal meaning: "Water Margin Story"
Transcriptions
Standard Mandarin
- Hanyu Pinyin: Shuǐhǔ zhuàn
- Wade–Giles: Shui^{3}-hu^{3} chuan^{4}
- IPA: [ʂwèɪ.xù ʈʂwân]
Wu
- Romanization: Sy^{去} vhu^{平} tsuae^{平}
Yue: Cantonese
- Yale Romanization: Séui-wú jyuhn
- Jyutping: Seoi^{2}-wu^{2} zyun^{6}
- IPA: [sɵɥ˧˥.wu˧˥ tsyn˨]
Southern Min
- Hokkien POJ: Suí hóo tuān

Water Margin (simplified Chinese: 水浒传; traditional Chinese: 水滸傳; pinyin: Shuǐhǔ Zhuàn), also called Outlaws of the Marsh or All Men Are Brothers, (Note: Other English translated names for the novel include Tale of the Marshes and The Marshes of Mount Liang.) is a Chinese novel from the Ming dynasty, attributed to Shi Nai'an. Regarded as one of the greatest Chinese novels, the novel is among the first works of Chinese fiction written entirely in vernacular Chinese. It is considered a masterpiece of Chinese literature, as well as a book of heroism and transgression.

Set during the Northern Song dynasty (twelfth century), the story follows a group of 108 outlaws that gathers at Mount Liang (also known as Liangshan Marsh) to rebel against the government. Later they are granted amnesty and enlisted by the government to resist the nomadic conquest of the Liao dynasty and other rebels. The original title of the novel was Water Margin for Loyalty and Justice (忠義水滸傳). A wealth of bibliographical and other evidence names Shi Nai'an, Luo Guanzhong (fl. 1330–1400), or both of them, as the novel's principal compiler, responsible for its original compilation. Through a complex textual evolution, a printed revision based on previous editions was published during the reign of Emperor Shizong (1522–1566) of the Ming dynasty, becoming the ancestral edition to a series of the most widely circulated versions. Dealing with social critique, the novel explores themes of morality, justice, authority and loyalty, and has been banned many times in its history.

Water Margin is an immediate inspiration for the later vernacular novels in its language, narrative rhetoric, structure, and distinctive elaboration of the themes of martiality and chivalry. The critics Li Zhi and Jin Shengtan both placed the book among the "greatest works of genius" in Chinese literature, and modern scholars and critics have been nearly unanimous in their praise of the work. Known for its heroic characterization of vigilantes, outlaws, and others who resist authority, the novel has introduced readers to some of the best-known characters in Chinese literature, such as Shi Jin, Lu Zhishen, Lin Chong, Wu Song, Li Kui, Yan Qing and Song Jiang. Its characters and plots frequently reappear in other novels, operas, and performance media of all sorts. With its theme of righteous bandit rebellion, Water Margin has long been an allegorical tool of historical and political commentary. Its influence spread far beyond the confines of literature.

== Historical context and inspirations ==
Water Margin is based on the exploits of the outlaw Song Jiang and his 107 companions; framed in the story as the incarnations of 108 demons representing 108 stars (the “36 heavenly spirits" (三十六天罡; sānshíliù tiāngāng) and the “72 earthly demons" (七十二地煞; qīshíèr dìshā)). The activities of Song Jiang's group were recorded in the historical text History of Song in the annals of Emperor Huizong of Song, which states:

(When) the outlaw Song Jiang of Huainan and others attacked the army at Huaiyang, (the Emperor) sent generals to attack and arrest them. (The outlaws) infringed on the east of the capital (Kaifeng), Henan, and entered the boundaries of Chu (referring to present-day Hubei and Hunan) and Haizhou (covering parts of present-day Jiangsu). The general Zhang Shuye was ordered to pacify them.

Zhang Shuye's biography further describes the activities of Song Jiang and the other outlaws, and tells they were eventually defeated by Zhang.

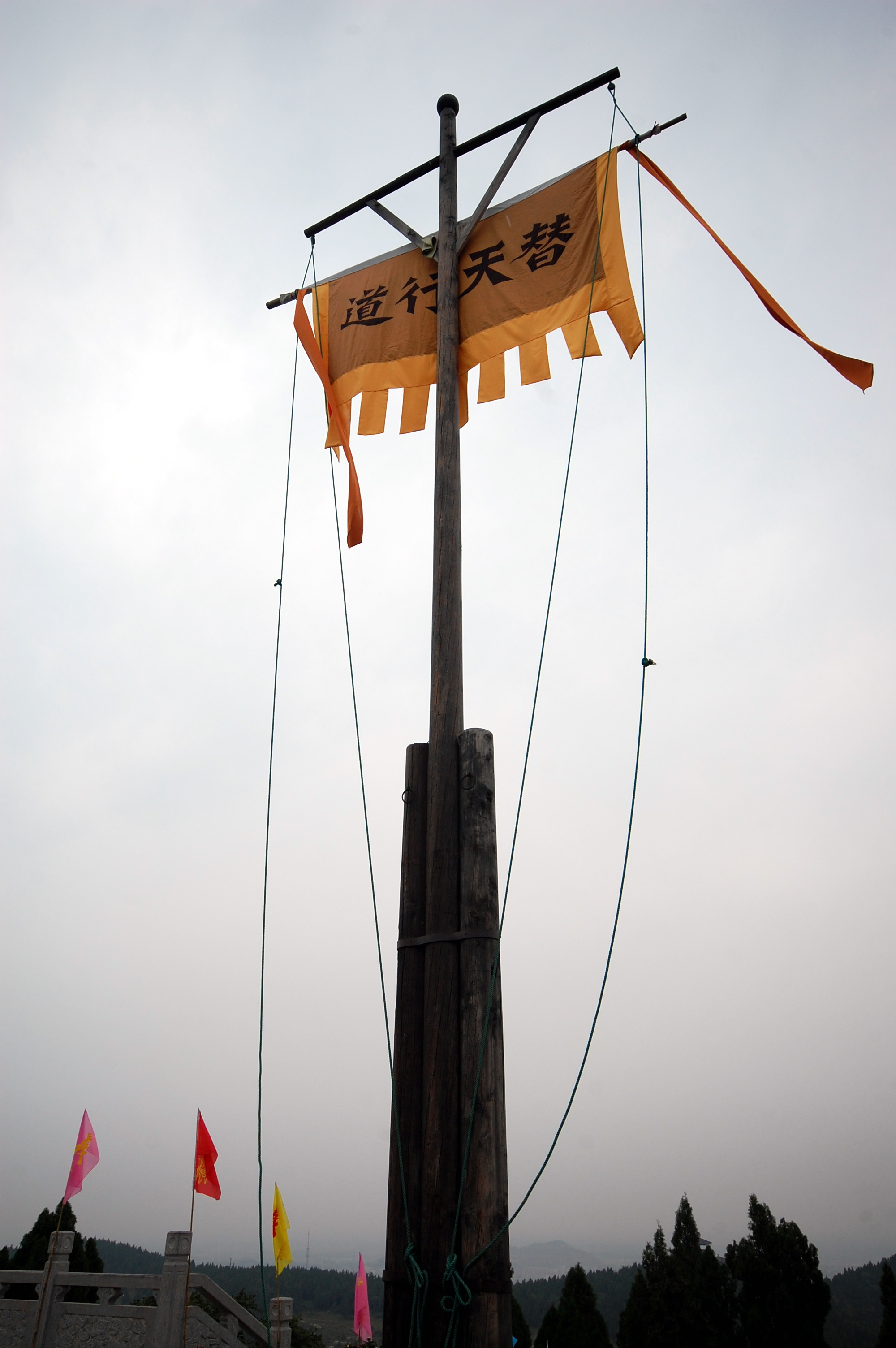
A flag that says "Act in Heaven's Behalf" (Chinese: 替天行道; pinyin: Tì Tiān Xíng Dào) on Mount Liang in Liangshan County, Shandong.

Folk stories about Song Jiang circulated during the Southern Song, and Song Jiang came to be portrayed as a rebel leader, fighting against their enemy, the Jin. The first known source to name Song Jiang's 36 companions was Miscellaneous Observations from the Year of Guixin (癸辛雜識) by Zhou Mi, written in the 13th century. Among the 36 of Song Jiang's companions, there are names like Lu Junyi, Guan Sheng, Ruan Xiao'er, Ruan Xiaowu, Ruan Xiaoqi, Liu Tang, Hua Rong and Wu Yong. Some of the characters who later became associated with Song Jiang also appeared around this time. They include Sun Li, Yang Zhi, Lin Chong, Lu Zhishen and Wu Song. Predating the advent of the novel, a sub-genre of Yuan zaju dramas, referred to as Shuihu plays, is dedicated to stories based on the legend of Song Jiang and his band. None of the Yuan-dynasty Shuihu plays are extant, and all the extant ones are of Ming editions, with Zhu Youdun's two plays being the earliest among them.

A precursor and blueprint of Water Margin is a compilation of folk tales titled Old Affairs of the Xuanhe Period (大宋宣和遺事), whose entire fourth section is devoted to the story of Song Jiang and the thirty-six heavenly spirits who are reincarnated as outlaws on Mount Liang, and features many of the storylines elaborated further in the novel later, including the robbery of the convoy carrying Cai Jing's birthday gifts and the death of Yan Poxi at the hands of Song Jiang. In its approach to Song Jiang's heroic group, the book already names all 36 members and it also lists all of them with their signature epithets in "a volume of celestial writing" revealed by Jiutian Xuannü. Gong Kai from the same period composed a set of thirty-six eulogies on the outlaws led by Song Jiang, who allegedly became brave patriots and contributed to suppressing rebellions.

According to historian James Zheng Gao, it was the storytellers in Hangzhou who first compiled and told stories about rural rebels in Shandong and provided the original oral version for what became Water Margin.

Fang La, one of the primary antagonists in Water Margin, was inspired by the real-life rebel of the same name. His rebellion was linked to the spread of Manichaeism in China during Song dynasty. The rebellion started by Fang La was portrayed as a prototypical "heretical uprising" in Chinese historiography. According to Li Zhi (1527–1602), the novel's successful campaigns against the Liao and against the domestic rebel Fang La were to be interpreted allegorically and comparatively, as reproof of the Song government for failing to prevent the capture of two former emperors by the Jin and for moving south instead of standing firm.

Both the Jiajing reign of the Ming dynasty (1521–1568) and the closing years of the Mongol-ruled Yuan dynasty (1360s) were marked by a chain of rebellions, which confused scholars a lot as to which of the two inspired the author, and hence when was the book written.

The title term Shuihu (Water Margin), alluding to an ode in the Classic of Poetry, which discusses how the righteous Zhou patriarch Danfu brought his people to safety at the foot of Mount Qi in present-day Shaanxi province, carries the connotations of political marginalization and rebellious resistance against the dynastic center.

According to Lu Xun, there was a large marshland at Mount Liang which existed since the Song dynasty, which served as inspiration for the base for Liangshan bandits.

== Plot ==
The opening episode in the novel is the release of the 108 Spirits, imprisoned under an ancient stele-bearing tortoise.

Detail of a scroll painting with numerous scenes of Water Margin, 18th century, Kupferstich-Kabinett

The next chapter describes the rise of Gao Qiu, one of the primary antagonists of the story. Gao abuses his status as a Grand Marshal by oppressing Wang Jin; Wang's father taught Gao a painful lesson when the latter was still a street-roaming ruffian. Wang Jin flees from the capital with his mother and by chance he meets Shi Jin, who becomes his apprentice. The next few chapters tell the story of Shi Jin's friend Lu Zhishen, followed by the story of Lu's sworn brother Lin Chong. Lin Chong is framed by Gao Qiu for attempting to assassinate him, and almost dies in a fire at a supply depot set by Gao's henchmen. He slays his foes and abandons the depot, eventually making his way to Liangshan Marsh, where he becomes an outlaw. Meanwhile, the "Original Seven", led by Chao Gai, rob a convoy of birthday gifts for the Imperial Tutor Cai Jing, another primary antagonist in the novel. They flee to Liangshan Marsh after defeating a group of soldiers sent by the authorities to arrest them, and settle there as outlaws with Chao Gai as their chief. As the story progresses, more people come to join the outlaw band, including military personnel and civil officials who grew tired of serving the corrupt government, as well as men with special skills and talents. Stories of the outlaws are told in separate sections in the following chapters. Connections between characters are vague, but the individual stories are eventually pieced together by chapter 60 when Song Jiang succeeds Chao Gai as the leader of the band after the latter is killed in a battle against the Zeng Family Fortress.

The plot further develops by illustrating the conflicts between the outlaws and the Song government after the Grand Assembly of the 108 outlaws. Song Jiang strongly advocates making peace with the government and seeking redress for the outlaws. After defeating the imperial army in a great battle at Liangshan Marsh, the outlaws eventually receive amnesty from Emperor Huizong. The emperor recruits them to form a military contingent and sends them on campaigns against invaders from the Liao dynasty and rebel forces led by Tian Hu, Wang Qing and Fang La within the Song dynasty's domain. Although the former outlaws eventually emerge victorious against the rebels and Liao invaders, the campaigns also lead to the tragic dissolution of the 108 heroes. At least two-thirds of them die in battle while the surviving ones either return to the imperial capital to receive honours from the emperor and continue serving the Song government, or leave and spend the rest of their lives as commoners elsewhere. Song Jiang himself is eventually poisoned to death by the "Four Treacherous Ministers" – Gao Qiu, Yang Jian, Tong Guan and Cai Jing.

=== Characters ===
The 108 Heroes (一百单八将) are at the core of the plot of Water Margin. Based on the Taoist concept that each person's destiny is tied to a "Star of Destiny" (宿星), the 108 Stars of Destiny are stars representing 108 demonic overlords who were banished by the deity Shangdi. Having repented since their expulsion, the 108 Stars are accidentally released from their place of confinement, and are reborn in the world as 108 heroes who band together for the cause of justice. They are divided into the 36 Heavenly Spirits and 72 Earthly Fiends.

=== Chapters ===
This outline of chapters is based on a 100 chapters edition. Yang Dingjian's 120 chapters edition includes other campaigns of the outlaws on behalf of Song dynasty, while Jin Shengtan's 70 chapters edition omits the chapters on the outlaws' acceptance of amnesty and subsequent campaigns.

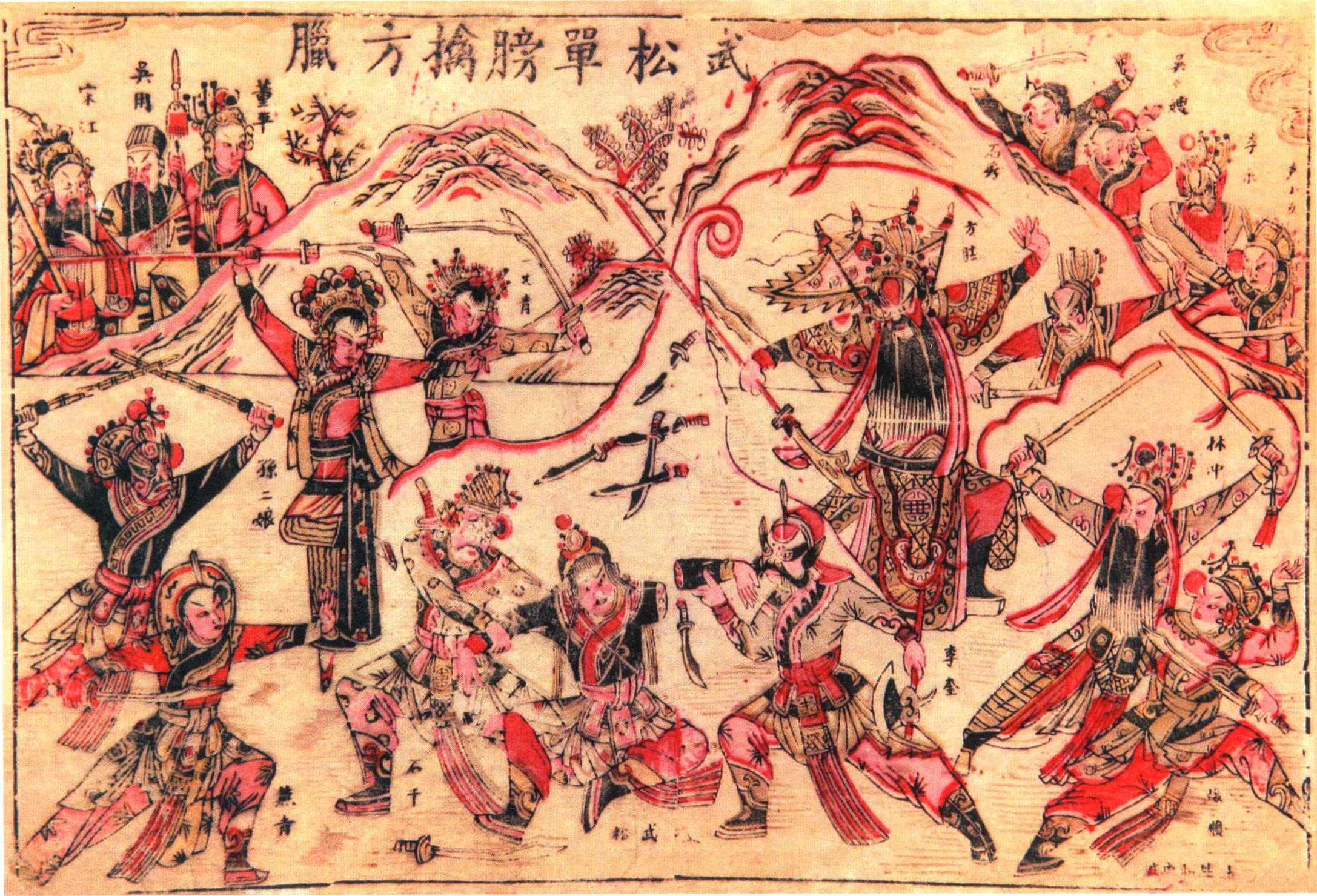
A Qing dynasty depiction of the Liangshan heroes battling Fang La

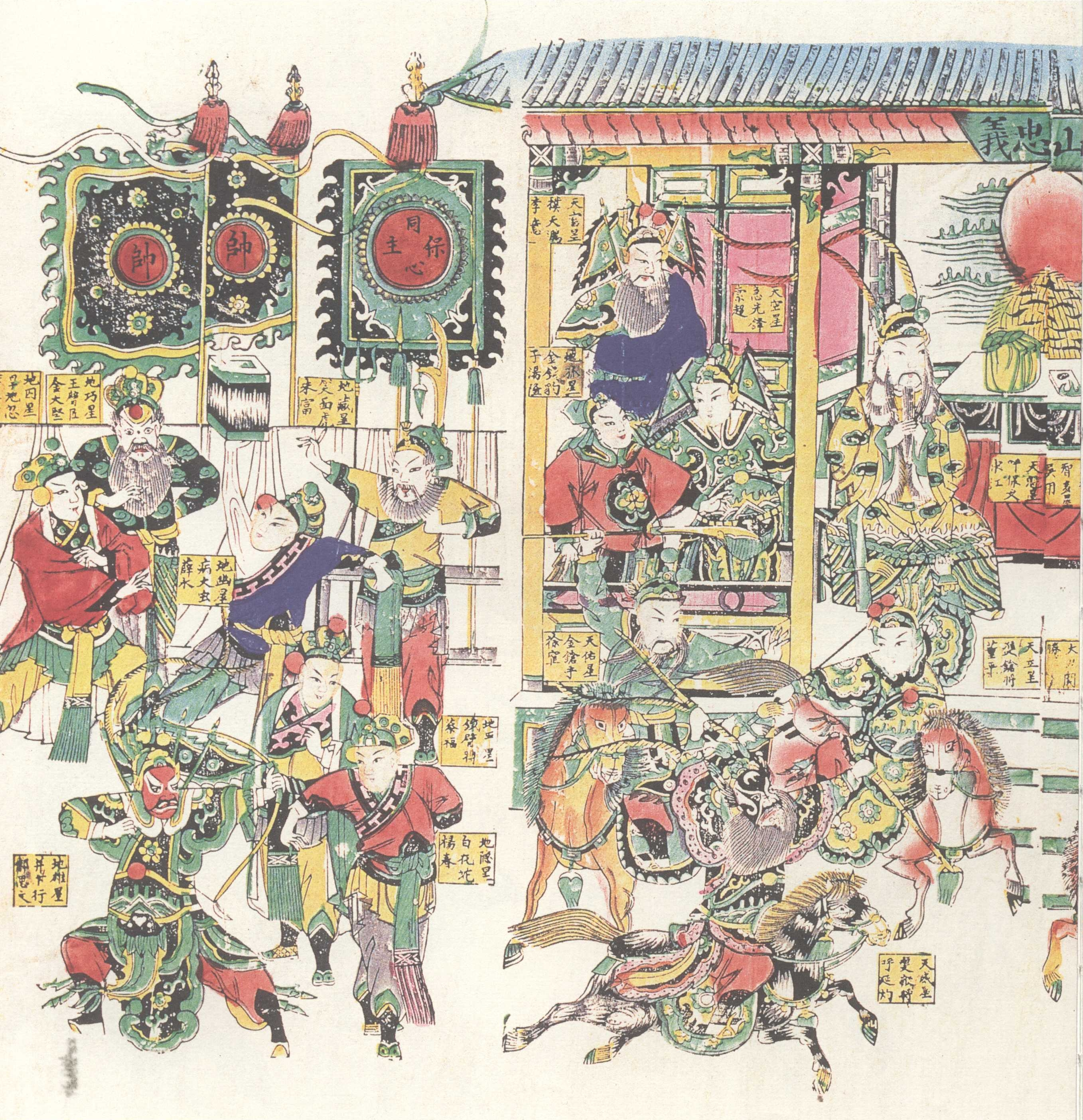
A print from the Shanghai Library's collection, portraying the 108 Heroes (detail)

Chapter(s)	Main events
1	Marshal Hong releases the 108 spirits
2	The rise of Gao Qiu
2–3	The story of Shi Jin
3–7	The story of Lu Zhishen
7–12	The story of Lin Chong
12–13	The story of Yang Zhi
13–20	The stealing of the birthday gifts by the "Original Seven"
20–22	The story of Song Jiang
23–32	The story of Wu Song
32–35	The story of Hua Rong
36–43	Song Jiang's encounters in Jiangzhou
44–47	The story of Shi Xiu and Yang Xiong
47–50	The three assaults on the Zhu Family Village
51–52	The story of Lei Heng and Zhu Tong
53–55	The outlaws' attack on Gaotangzhou; the search for Gongsun Sheng
55–57	The first imperial assault on Liangshan Marsh (led by Huyan Zhuo)
57–59	The outlaws' attack on Qingzhou; Huyan Zhuo's defection to Liangshan
59–60	The outlaws, led by Gongsun Sheng, attack Mount Mangdang
60	The first assault by the outlaws on the Zeng Family Village; the death of Chao Gai
60–67	The story of Lu Junyi; the outlaws attack Daming Prefecture; the second imperial assault on Liangshan Marsh (led by Guan Sheng)
67	Guan Sheng defects to Liangshan; The third imperial assault on Liangshan Marsh (led by Shan Tinggui and Wei Dingguo)
68	The second assault by the outlaws on the Zeng Family Fortress;
69–70	The outlaws attack Dongping and Dongchang prefectures
71–74	The Grand Assembly; the funny and lethal antics of Li Kui
75–78	Emperor Huizong offers amnesty for the first time; the fourth imperial assault on Liangshan Marsh (led by Tong Guan)
78–80	The fifth imperial assault on Liangshan Marsh (led by Gao Qiu)
81–82	The outlaws are granted amnesty
83–89	The Liangshan heroes attack the Liao invaders
90–99	The Liangshan heroes attack Fang La
100	The tragic dissolution of the Liangshan heroes

The extended version includes the Liangshan heroes' expeditions against the rebel leaders Tian Hu and Wang Qing prior to the campaign against Fang La.

== Reception ==
A critical commentary of Water Margin by philosopher and writer Li Zhi (1527–1602)

A critical commentary of the novel by Zhong Bojing, 1625

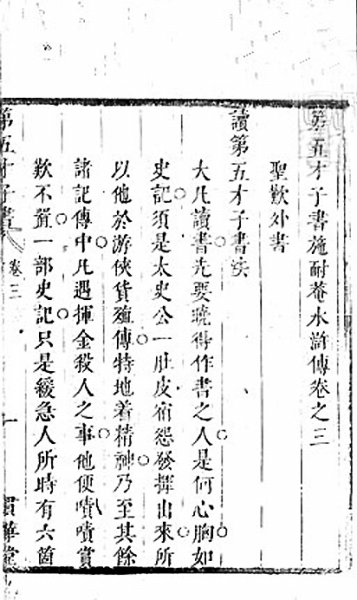
A critical commentary on the novel by Jin Shengtan (1608–1661)

Water Margin, praised as an early "masterpiece" of vernacular fiction, is renowned for the "mastery and control" of its mood and tone. The novel is also known for its use of vivid, humorous and especially racy language. For the seventeenth-century scholar Dadi Yuren, Water Margin was to be acclaimed because it demonstrated the moral principles of loyalty (zhong) and righteousness (yi) which were crucial for the society. Some commentaries and sources from the late Ming and early Qing suggest that many Water Margin characters appealed to the literati readers of that time because of their symbolic power as the "genuine" and the "primitive", in which many literati found it unexpectedly refreshing. Many Ming dynasty writers and scholars have lauded the novel, as Li Kaixian (1502–1568) writes:

Cui Xian (崔銑) [1479—1541], Xiang Guo (熊过) [1507—1581], Tang Shunzhi, Wang Shenzhong, and Chen Shu (陳束) [1508—1540] say that the Water Margin is filled with minute details and numerous veins that link up, and that only the Records of the Grand Historian surpasses this book. Moreover, since ancient times there has never before been a book about a single event in twenty volumes (ce). One who would fault it for its treacherous banditry and deception knows nothing of methods for narrating events or of the subtleties of the study of history.

On the other hand, ever since the novel became circulated in print, it has been received with profound ambivalence as a politically subversive and even potentially countercultural text. It has also been denounced as "obscene" by various critics since the Ming dynasty. Certain literati found Water Margin to be dangerous for readers who might rebel against imperial authority after reading this novel, given its images of rebellion in the conflict between the Liangshan fraternity and government forces.

"These seduction cases are the hardest of all. There are five conditions that have to be met before you can succeed. First, you have to be as handsome as Pan An. Second, you need a tool as big as a donkey's. Third, you must be as rich as Deng Tong. Fourth, you must be as forbearing as a needle plying through cotton wool. Fifth, you've got to spend time. It can be done only if you meet these five requirements."

"Frankly, I think I do. First, while I'm far from a Pan An, I still can get by. Second, I've had a big cock since childhood."

— Excerpt from the novel, translated by Sidney Shapiro

The novel is widely acclaimed as among the finest of all the fictional works of the same period, and it has been subjected to more scholarly critical attention than most other novels. According to Xu Yongqiang of the School of Humanities at Xi'an University of Electronic Science and Technology, there have been approximately 50 monographic series and over 1,000 research and analysis works on the Water Margin from the Ming and Qing dynasties to the present-day, demonstrating its immense influence and establishing "Water Margin Studies" as a prominent discipline of study.

In his reading guidelines for Water Margin, Jin Shengtan identifies fifteen literary techniques, including "advance insertion", "detailed and extended narration", "direct repetition", and "incomplete repetition of a topic", noting that Water Margin contains forms of diction, phrasing, sectioning, and the form of a work as a whole—all literary phenomena that fall under the category of visible and material dharmas known as rūpa. He asserts that "Water Margin itself turns out to contain the methods for reading all the world's books". Jin also claims that the author not only gave 36 different faces to the 36 major heroes in the novel, the author also created 36 different personalities as well, and points out that Water Margin emphasizes the construction of meaningful relationships between the characters.

Jaroslav Průšek wrote, "With its account of the bold deeds of the rebels, each told with fresh originality, with its apt characterization of their individual features, its precise yet poetic portrayal of the environment, this romance is a treasure of Chinese popular literature, and an inexhaustible source of ideas for the theatre and the story-tellers."

Sinologist Lois M. Fusek framed the parallel between Water Margin, which is revolutionary, glorifying bandits as divinely ordained agents of change; with the novel The Three Sui Quash the Demons' Revolt, which tone more reformist and traditional, deriding such figures—depicted as humble peddlers like noodle-vendors and cake-sellers—as absurd pretenders to heavenly mandate. This mockery underscores a pro-establishment stance, emphasizing swift suppression. Other than that, the temporal momentum complements spatial allusions of Three Suis with Water Margin's iconic locales and archetypes creates a satirical mirror-world between those two novels.

== Themes ==
=== Religion ===
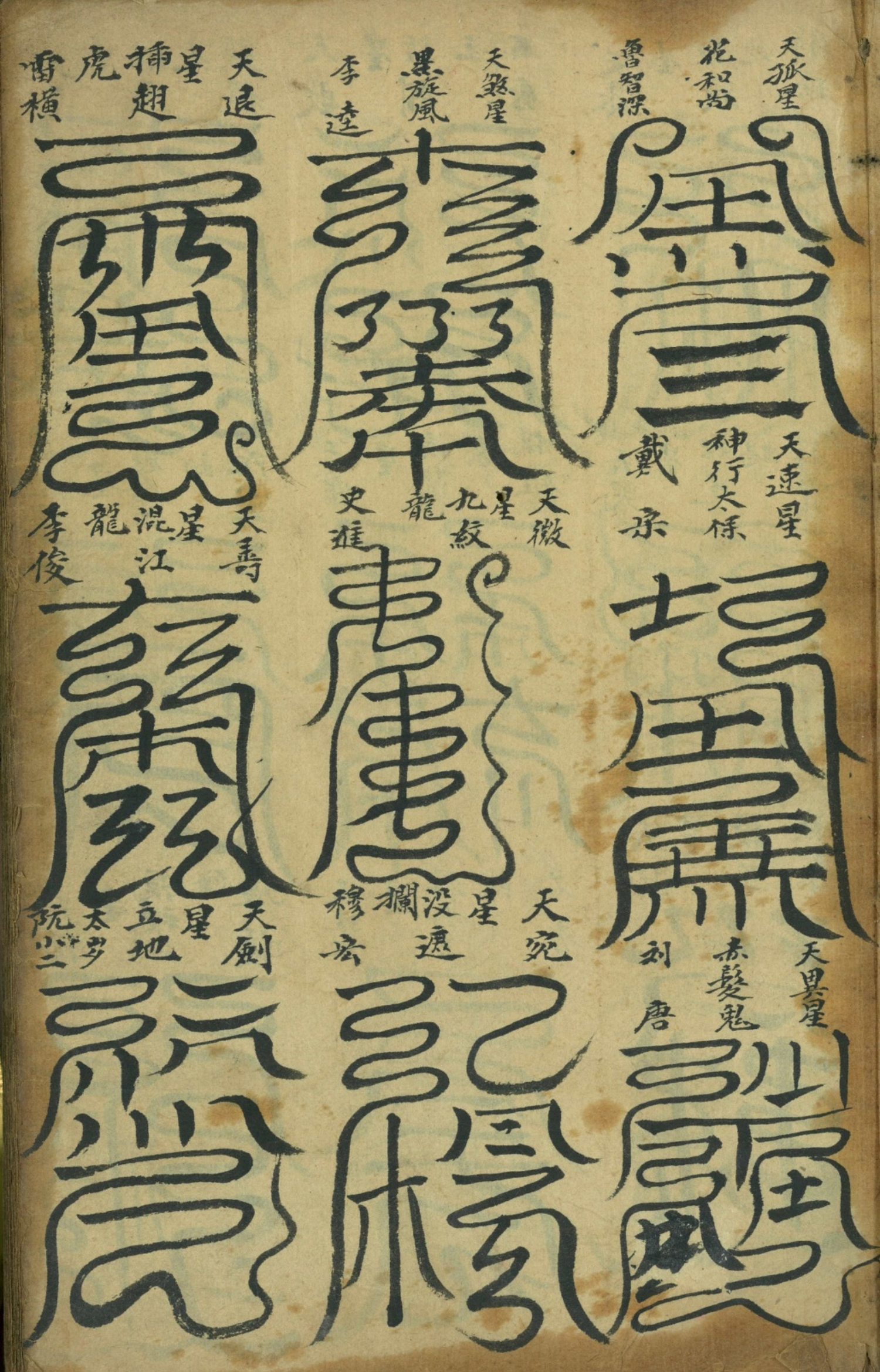
A Taoist manuscript from Li County, Hunan contains codifications of talismans for each of the 108 protagonists from Water Margin, 19th century

The motif of pairings between 36 and 72 stars, possibly inspired from Dipper, were common among Chinese mythologies and folk tales, including Water Margin, which represented by the number of its protagonists. The religious theme of these 108 demons that incarnated into the 108 Liangshan bandits apparently drew inspiration from the 36 heavenly spirits and 72 earth fiends that also appeared in a later Chinese vernacular novel titled Investiture of the Gods. In that novel, the 108 demons were gathered by Jiang Taigong to fight against Di Xin. Liu Ts'un-yan added that the motif of 108 stars (36 spirits and 72 fiends representatives) constellation which appeared in both works were influenced by Buddhism and Taoism. The organization of Flowers in the Mirror owes much to this orchestration of Water Margin.

Others analysed Li Kui, one of the most savage Liangshan bandit characters, in more religious aspects, by quoting from the words of Luo Zhenren (a Taoist immortal in the novel who comments on the characters' fates) and a famous line from Laozi's Tao Te Ching (chapter 5): "天地不仁，以万物为刍狗 ("Heaven and Earth are impartial and treat all beings as disposable "straw dogs" used in rituals"). This portrays the spiritual character of Li Kui as being representative of the chaotic force of nature, blending divine indifference with animalistic instincts.

Furthermore, both Victor Purcell and Joseph W. Esherick have recorded that Water Margin—along with Romance of the Three kingdoms and Investiture of the Gods— were quite influential for the religious Belief of the radical Boxer movement in shaping their ideology, which became the reason for Qing government to ban the novel in 1799.

Tao Chengzhang (d. 1911) attributed the surge of religious movements like the White Lotus Societies in north China and the Heaven and the Earth Society in the south was due to the influences of the novels Investiture of the Gods and Water Margin respectively. He writes: "Throughout the area of Shandong, Shanxi and Henan [that is, the north] there is no one who does not believe [zunxin] in the Investiture of the Gods story. Throughout the area of Jiangsu, Zhe-jiang, Fujian and Guangzhou [the south] there is no one who does not venerate [chongbai] the book, Water Margin". As Daniel L. Overmyer observes, northerners canonization of Investiture of the Gods and southerners veneration of Water Margin, illustrates their symbiotic role in faith: a subversive tool empowering the illiterate through heroic divinity.

In the novel, the Mount Liang bandits are under the aegis of a divine woman named Jiutian Xuannü (九天玄女 lit. "Dark Maiden of Ninefold Heavens"). They need guidance from this "great mother" to fight against the threat of death, as well as to pursue the value of life with others, instead of struggling for individual survival in a self-contained way. In Ming dynasty, lesser-known female deities surpassed the elite Queen Mother of the West in vernacular novels like Water Margin and Investiture of the Gods. Rooted in Chinese folk religion, likely inspiring syncretic sectarian icons such as the Venerable Mother Guanyin. These "post-menopausal" goddesses embody pure motherliness—nurturing wisdom without childbirth's mess or sexual desire's pitfalls—aligning with Confucian purity yet excising femininity's "negatives" like vulnerability and passion. However, this desexualized ideal reinforces gender binaries, reflecting Ming anxieties over female sexuality amid orthodoxy-heterodoxy clashes.

=== Politics ===
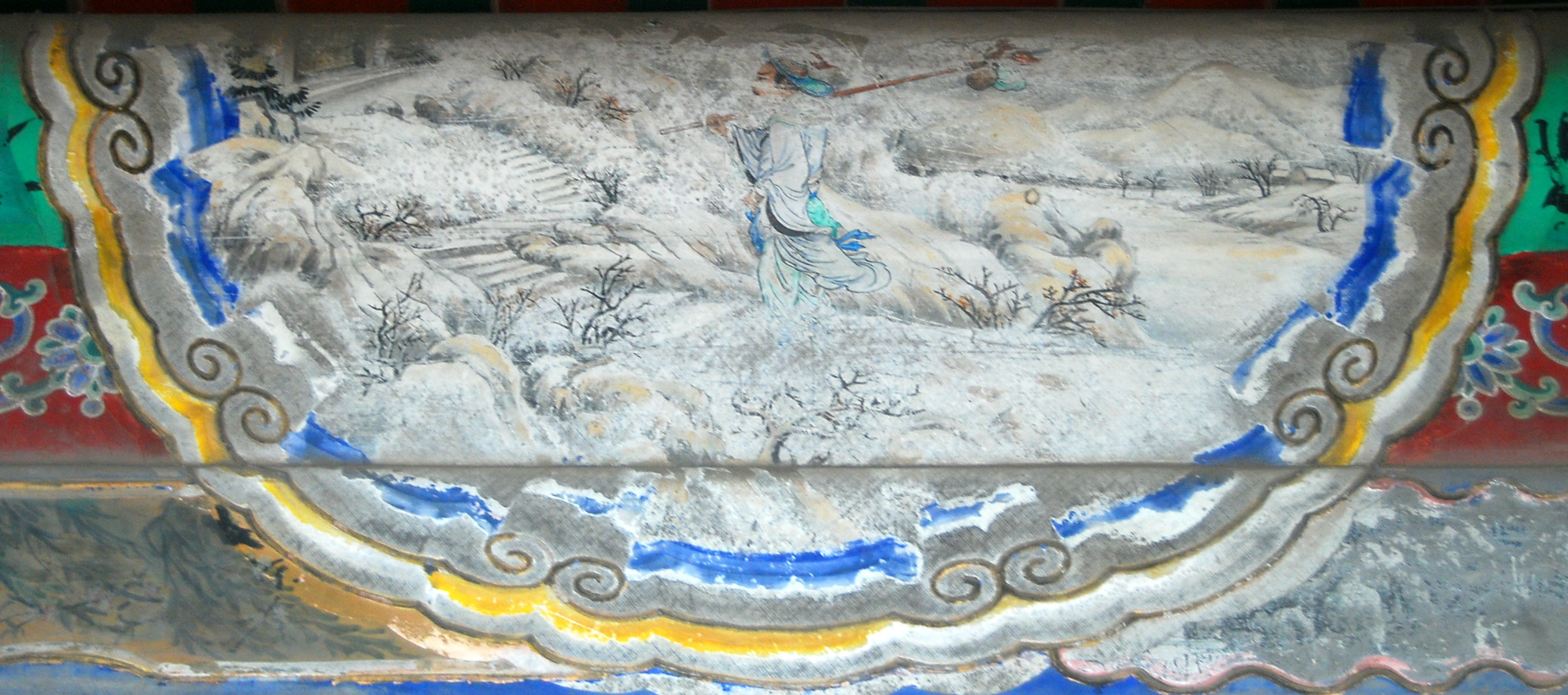
Lin Chong (Summer Palace mural)

A major portion of the novel is made up of a series of connected stories, each recounting the making of a hero, his sufferings under an unjust social system and his resort to banditry as a relief from political persecution; hence, the expression bi shang Liangshan (逼上梁山; 'being forced to climb the Liang mountains') or "being driven to rebel". As Hŏ Kyun insisted, they were changed from the common people or blaming people to the resistant people. Wu-chi Liu suggests the novel epitomizes human suffering and degradation at the hands of the ruling class, and notes that there is little doubt where the author's sympathy lies: the bandit leaders are definitely the heroes of the novel and their uprising can only be attributed to government oppression and tyranny. History and literature critic Shang Wei viewed Water Margin as a one of a kind novel which concerned about people's history ("petty history"), dynastic cycle topics, and among many others.

The heroes' slogan—"Accomplish the Way for Heaven!" (替天行道)—challenges an existing authority which subverts the Confucian ideal of government, and appeals to the moral sanctions that justify the replacement of an evil ruler by one who will reconstitute the moral order. The model of political action established in the novel stresses social solidarity. For the radical thinker Li Zhi, who esteems the fair-minded and honest outlaws as the arbiters of the correct course of the Chinese empire, their violent and conscientious resistance to political corruption and social repression proves their patriotism and loyalism in the "World Upside Down"—a world where authority has lost its legitimacy. The book is also largely considered to reveal that "chaos works from the upper class" (亂自上作). Wei Jingsheng said the struggle of heroes in Water Margin was "exactly the kind of struggle aimed at winning equality of rights for man as a human being", and these heroic tales signified the historical continuity of the Chinese people's political struggle for recognition.

In the Ming and early Qing periods, the argument centered on whether the novel's protagonists were "loyal and righteous" or "bandits". By the time of the late Qing dynasty, bourgeois revolutionaries began to interpret the novel from the point view of Western bourgeois thought such as liberty, equality, and human rights, seeing the book as "the beginnings of democracy and civil society". Since the 1950s, the "Peasant Uprising" hypothesis has become one of the most influential and widespread interpretations in the study of the themes of the novel. Yet specialists continue to disagree about the political philosophy of Water Margin. David Wang suggests that in the novel the heroes are torn between "total self-dedication and total self-betrayal" by first adhering to the code of chivalric fraternity against the authorities and then to the ideology of imperial loyalty. The book's challenging political implications have continued to exercise theorists in China even in recent times. The literary critic and novelist Wang Zhongqi wrote in 1907:

Since the birth of the society, there are no instances of an organization of government constituted one hundred people that are equal to one another. Water Margin is the only one. Had Shi Nai'an been born in the West, his work would be comparable to those of Plato, Bakunin, and Tolstoy. Looking at its egalitarianism, Water Margin is a work of socialism. Looking at its vengeance on the corrupted officials, it is a work of anarchism. All the organizations depicted in the Water Margin are complete in their functions. If we look at it this way, Water Margin is a political novel.

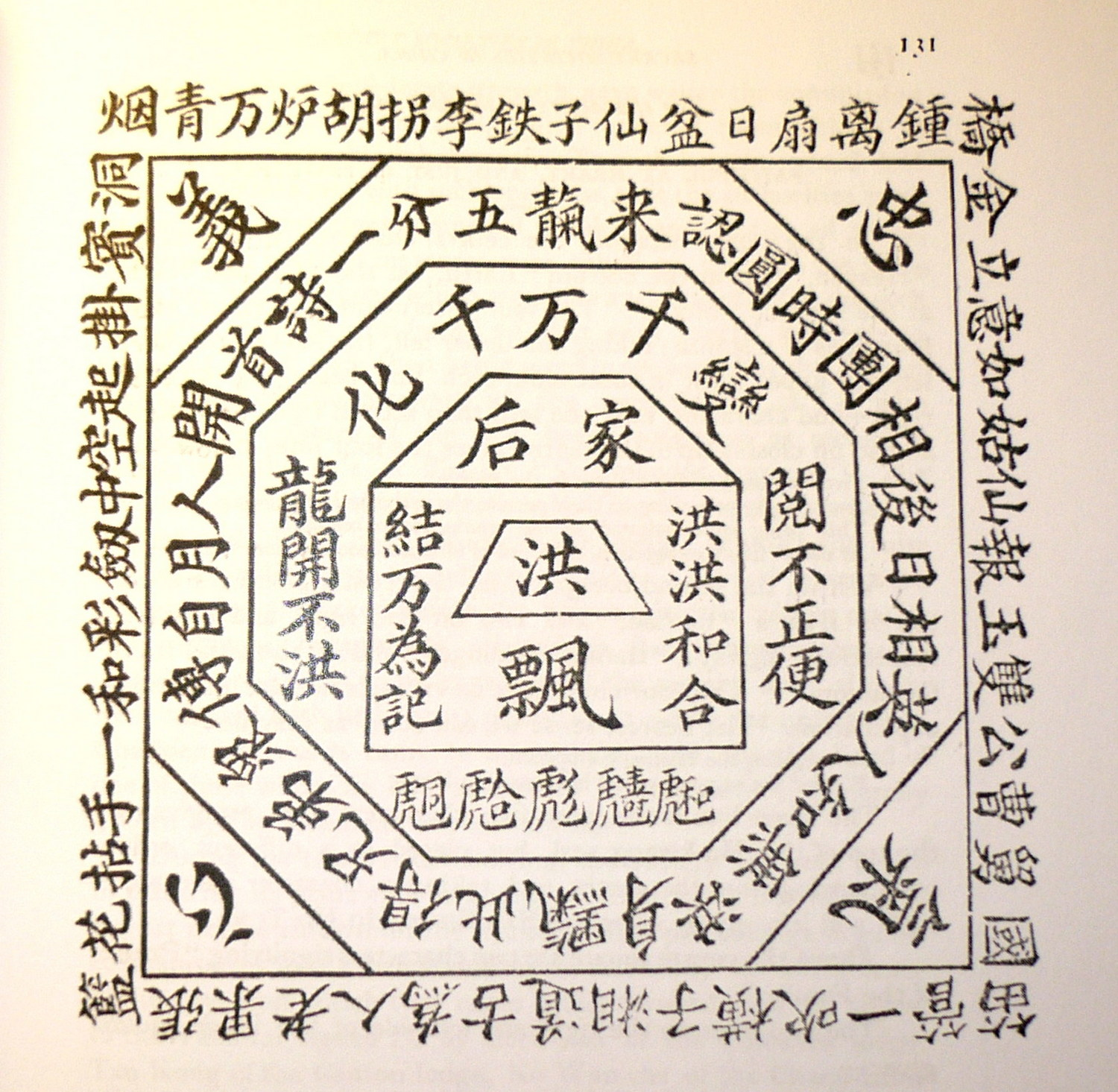
Seal of the Hongmen, the precursor of Tiandihui secret society, 19th century

According to Li Shi (1471–1538), the authorial rationale behind the counterfactual victory of the Southern Song over the Liao at the end of the novel stems from the patriotic motivations of the novel's alleged authors, Shi Nai'an and Luo Guanzhong—both of whom lived during the Yuan dynasty. Furthermore, Water Margin has been politically influential throughout subsequent Chinese history: while several emperors and Confucian elites banned the novel for its violent and rebellious content, the challengers of the established order, from Taiping rebels in the mid 19th century to Communist revolutionaries, honored it for the same reason.

Some argue that the novel's theme of revolt against authority became popular during turbulent times of the Ming dynasty, others argue that Water Margin became popular during the Yuan as the common people (predominantly Han Chinese) resented the Mongol rulers. Zuo Maodi (左懋第) (1601–1645), a Ming dynasty vice minister of war, viewed the Water Margin as a book that taught people to be criminals. He believed that if the book was not banned, it would impact the societal atmosphere negatively. Chongzhen Emperor of the Ming dynasty, acting on his advice, banned the book. In 1642, the Ming government ordered all its woodblocks and printed copies to be burned immediately. Chen Chen, a Ming loyalist, saw the novel as an expression of Song resistance to the Mongol invaders in the Yuan dynasty.

Many late Ming peasant rebel leaders were taking the names or nicknames of Water Margin heroes for themselves, and some northern brigand bands even organized themselves into thirty-six or seventy-two smaller troops after the numbers of major and minor Water Margin heroes. Historian James Bunyan Parsons argues that Water Margin may have had some influence on Zhang Xianzhong's rebellion. Based on Parsons' hypothesis, Mark R. E. Meulenbeld points out that Zhang Xianzhong was recorded using the novels as a source for emulation, as he quoted an early Qing observer who ascribes Zhang's fondness with the novel, "The shrewdness of Zhang Xianzhong included him making people read books like Three Kingdoms and Water Margin every day..." It was attested by citation from Perry Link, that during the end of Ming dynasty period, rebels in Hebei used slogans such as "killing the rich to help the poor" and "carrying out the Dao on behalf of Heaven", which were popularized by both Water Margin and Romance of the Three Kingdoms as a form of "remedial protest".

The Jurchen chief and Khan Nurhaci learned Chinese military and political strategies from Romance of the Three Kingdoms and Water Margin.

King Yeongjo of Joseon, the first Joseon monarch to leave explicit records of reading Water Margin, frequently cited the novel's plotlines and characters in court discussions between him and his ministers, and it exerted a tangible influence on the handling of Korean state affairs.

Yu Wanchun instead gave his negative assessment as he saw its polemical tone and encouragement of brigandage and revolt as a potential threat to the state. Late Ming dynasty scholar Jin Shengtan criticized Shi Nai'an as not motivated by traditional scholarly venting resentment through writing but as a way of leisure. Jin also questioned the inconsistency of Song Jiang's characterization according to Confucian morality.

In the aftermath of Qing dynasty's literary inquisition by Qianlong emperor, the novel saw another boom of mass popularity and a wave of massive publications followed. This attracted the concern of a Qing official named Ding Richang, who pointed out its polemical social effect, although he did not outright pursue banning the book. After the authorities issued numerous edicts against it because of its praise and support for rebels, in 1851 a group of Hunanese and Sichuanese secret societies or, as the official documents call them, "religious bandits", was accused of owing many of their ideas to Water Margin, with the result that yet another edict against the novel was promulgated.

A Qing dynasty New Year picture depicting the story of Wu Song in ten chapters

The ethics of outlaw loyalty permeated even the Post-1853 grand Taiping Heavenly Kingdom shifted toward Water Margin-inspired ethics, emphasizing blind loyalty to leaders and "yi"-style camaraderie. This suggests a tactical evolution from religious millenarianism to pragmatic, bandito-like solidarity, blending ancient monarchical fealty with subversive brotherhood. According to Frederic Wakeman, the fraternal hierarchy which formed by Taiping leaders such as Heavenly King Hong Xiuquan, East King Yang Xiuqing, North King Wei Changhui, and Wing King Shi Dakai was partly modelled on the brotherhood of the Liangshan outlaws from the novel. Graciela de la Lama stated that the main concept of the politico-literary "model" which was borrowed by the Taipings was the concepts of "Loyalty and Fraternity" (忠義) which was followed by the Liangshan outlaws in the book.

Elizabeth J. Perry's investigation with Anhui University scholars has concluded that the Nian Rebellion's slogan banner, "Preparing the Way for Heaven, killing the rich to relieve the poor; Alliance Leader of the Great Chinese, Chang", which borrowed from the White Lotus sect, was inspired by the Water Margin, emulating the outlaw heroes of Liangshan.

The Baguadao sect used banners with the inscription "Entrusted by Heaven to Prepare the Way" during Eight Trigrams uprising of 1813, a reference to the Water Margin novel.

Meanwhile, in the early-modern era, Water Margin has long and broad influence beyond its narrative as the inspiration for various subversive movements. The Triad (organized crime), enigmatic fraternal orders which were born in the Qing era's underbelly as a subversive force, blended messianic zeal (e.g., their slogan "Oppose the Qing and restore the Ming") with demonological rituals for political legitimacy. Their adoption of Water Margin's "yi" (unquestioning comradeship) rejects Confucian norms of duty and righteousness, positioning them as outlaw heroes. This unorthodoxy, combined with ritualistic elements, frames them as agents of political rebellion rather than mere criminals.

Furthermore, Chinese revolutionary figure Song Jiaoren (1882–1913) idealizes the "heroes of the forest" (bandit archetypes from Water Margin) as embodying Robin Hood-esque justice and chivalry. Despite critiquing their criminality and foreign alliances, he invokes ethnic Han solidarity ("fellow descendants of our Yellow Emperor") to humanize them, using the novel as a lens for nationalist empathy. Novelist Zhang Henshui felt that Water Margin's emphasis on the patriotism as Liangshan outlaws join Song government troops against the Jin invaders, could inspire anti-Japanese feeling among the Chinese living in Shanghai.

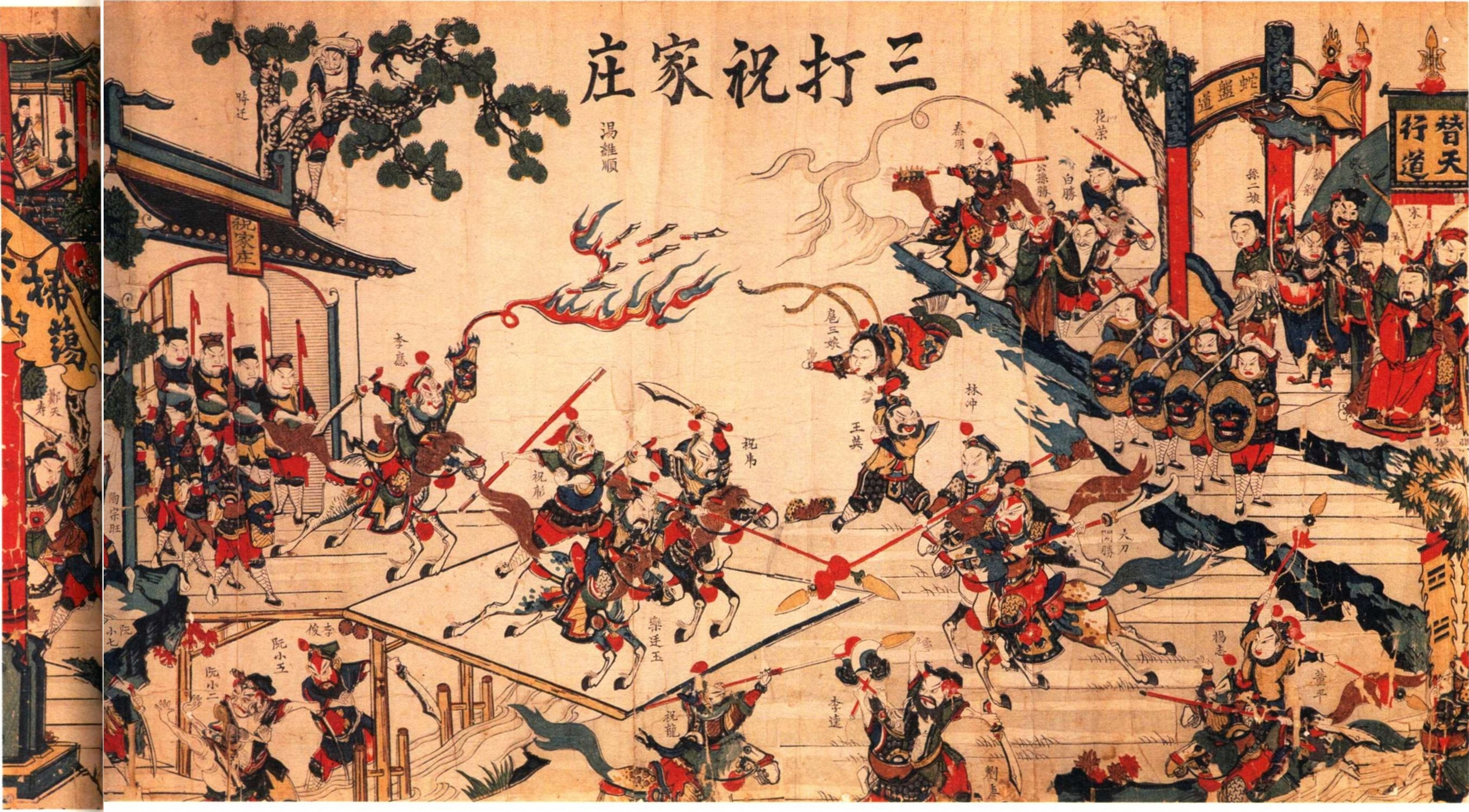
Three Attacks on Zhu Village (三打祝家庄), woodblock print, Jiaqing Period (1796–1820)

Secret societies and criminal organizations during the Republic era also adopted code like Water Margin's martial fraternity, such as the Green Gang From Shanghai and the Blue Shirts Society, an unofficial secret police of the Chiang Kai-shek regime. One of the Blue Shirts founding members, Dai Li, developed the organization based on the value of heroism and outlaw martial artists of the Water Margin, where the recruits drawn from the lower strata of society: jugglers, wrestlers, itinerant entertainers, journeymen traders, jailers, executioners, thieves, and gangsters. May Fourth iconoclasts such as Mao Dun saw fit to transmit the novel's spirit without a trace of self-consciousness.

There are many examples of materialist dialectics in Water Margin, of which the episode of the three attacks on Zhu Village is one of the best.

— Mao Zedong, On Contradiction, 1937

Water Margin also found its legs in the history of Chinese Communist Party, where the novel enjoyed the party's endorsement since the 1930s for their political aim. Communist critics have invariably praised Water Margin as a great revolutionary novel, which "exposes the ugliness of feudal bureaucratic systems, portrays the heroes' actions and minds, celebrates their rebellious spirits, and reflects the class struggle between the oppressed masses and the ruling class", and they conceive of the Liangshan band as the vanguard of a class-conscious peasant force striving for enlightened political and economic revolution. Liu Kwang-ching noted that Water Margin was one of Mao Zedong's favorite readings. Mao chose to regard Song Jiang as a prototypic peasant leader and identified his rebellion as the uprising of the peasant classes of old China, and Maoist authors regularly allude to such "declassed rebels" as "models" for the "people", claiming the revolutionary bourgeois and petit-bourgeois of the novel constitute models "of the true hero in the hearts of the people".

During the Cultural Revolution, Mao presented his Water Margin commentary on August 14, 1975, in response to a request from a teacher of Chinese literature at Peking University, Lu Di, where Mao mentioned the novel as a political text "for learning by negative example, letting the people know the capitulationists". Within hours, the radical Gang of Four launched the Criticize Water Margin Campaign, which was prompted in part by that group's opposition to the rehabilitation of a number of prominent political figures under the auspices of Zhou Enlai. The current Chinese official view, generally shared by Western observers, is that the gang deliberately "exploited" a few offhand comments by Mao. A flood of articles in the most authoritative Chinese publications denounced the book because Song Jiang - the leader of the peasant rebels - ultimately surrendered to the Emperor. Song is condemned as a renegade and the book is attacked on the ground that it glorifies him and his exploits, thus espousing "capitulationism". The chief targets of the campaign, Deng Xiaoping and Zhou Enlai, are thought to have corresponded to the arch capitulationist Song Jiang in the language of the campaign. However, the allusion campaign of the Gang of Four backfired, ending with Deng Xiaoping emerging victorious from the political struggle.

Another reason for Mao's criticism of the Water Margin was a move to curtail the possibility of armed coup by Lin Biao's faction. As Mao said, "The rebels in Water Margin fought against dishonest officials but did not oppose the emperor. Later they capitulated. Take note, revisionism may emerge in China."

=== Social ===
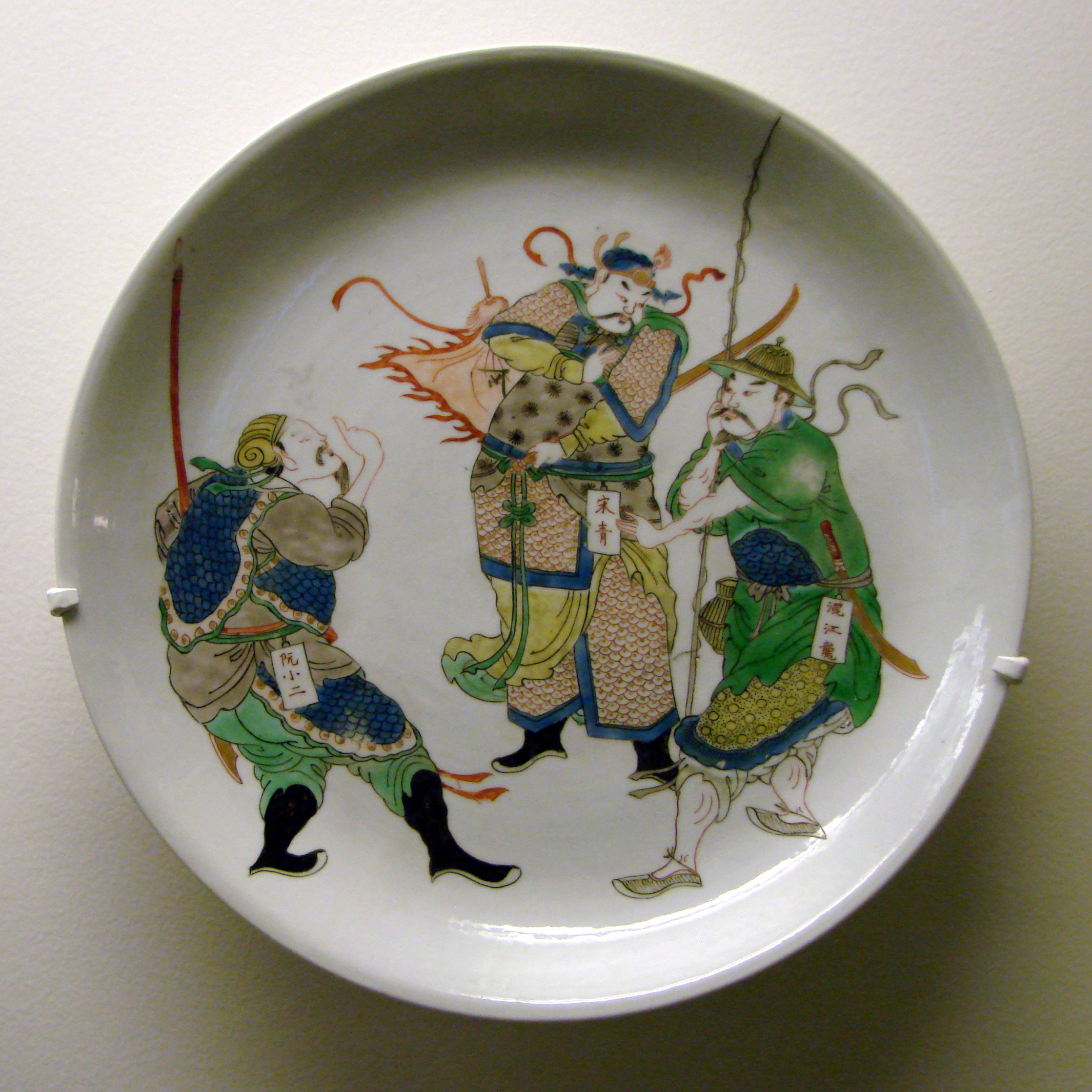
Song Qing, Li Jun, and Ruan Xiao'er depicted in a Qing dynasty Kangxi period plate painting

A major social themes in Water Margin is yi (義; 'righteousness'), or "gallant fraternity", a moral code which Andrew H. Plaks translated as "good," "valor," "honor," "generosity," or "nobility". Li Wenzhi concluded in his book, Popular revolts of the late Ming, that the concept of yi which was supposed to be a regulatory code for the bandit chieftains, rebel and secret society leaders swore brotherhood together. This means the Youxia (Chinese knight-errant) motif in the novel expected one to focus on male bonding and unmoved by romance or sex. Its more complete form is zhong yi (忠義). Most of the existing editions of Water Margin in the Ming dynasty put "Zhongyi" in an obvious position, and zhong (忠; 'loyalty toward one's superiors') requires one-dimensional "minister" obedience to "monarch", which is repeated many times in the text. The critic Huang Moxi (1866–1913) contends that exerting oneself to the utmost for social good is called zhong (loyalty), putting this virtue into practice is called yi (righteousness), and loyalty to Heaven denotes a firm commitment to social justice and to people's well-being.

Another theme is hǎo hàn (好漢; 'tough guy'), an antinomianism masculinity moral code. The hǎo hàn code values freedom and brotherhood above everything else, though it means one should sacrifice his own wife and children. The indispensable personality traits of a haohan include a man's dedication to the code of brotherhood, ability and interest in gymnastic arts, generosity to friends, and "drinking wine in big bowls and eating meat in big pieces" (大碗喝酒，大塊吃肉) to show manliness. This ideal of courageous manhood did not shy away from violence, and even gloried in it. Portrayals of female hǎo hàn also existed in the novel, but they are often depicted as bloodthirsty as their male counterparts. As its non-elite, and in some ways anti-elitist, haohan infringes on the exclusive moral and political claims of the imperial order and scholar-officials from a Confucian perspective. In the words of Keith McMahon:

The haohan ideology is summed up by a number of key expressions which stress honor, duty, and comradeship. This comradeship is male-oriented, as indicated by the recurrent motto of "Within the Four Seas, all men are brothers" (四海之內皆兄弟也). As for honor and duty, the general mission of the rebel band of haohan is to "enforce the True Way on behalf of Heaven" (替天行道) , that is, to enforce the higher good that bad rulers and officials disregard. In addition, there are ideals such as "upholding honor and belittling wealth" (仗義疏財) and "helping those on the wayside who have been wronged" (路見不平).

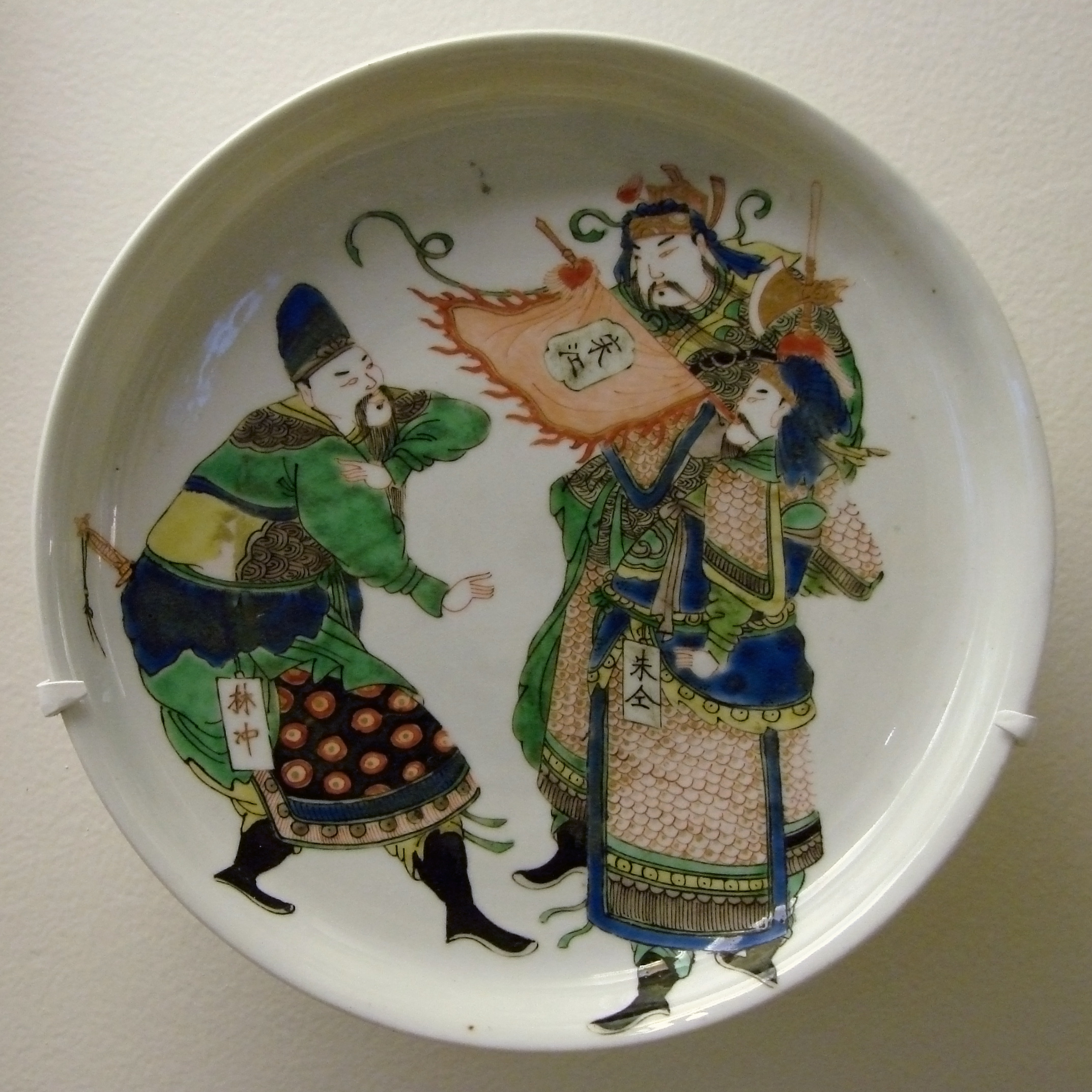
Song Jiang, Lin Chong, and Zhu Tong depicted in a Qing dynasty Kangxi period plate painting

Susan L. Mann writes that the "desire for male camaraderie" is "far from a mere plotline," for it is a basic theme of this and other classic novels. She places the novel's male characters in a tradition of men's culture of mutual trust and reciprocal obligation, such as figures known as the Chinese knight-errant. She finds such figures in this and other novels, such as Romance of the Three Kingdoms and Journey to the West, all of which dramatized the "empathic emotional attraction between men who appreciate and play off against one another's complementary qualities." Chen Pingyuan argues that Water Margin does not belong to the knight-errant tradition and classifies it under the category of dynastic heroes involved in preserving the state and its dominant ideology. Martin Weizong Huang stated that the problematic relations among the different aspects of the concept of yi (such as the private vs. the public) are explored in the novel in terms of subversion and parody, of which the most dramatized is the conflict between zhong and yi.

Licentious and treacherous women are another recurring theme. Modern critics have debated whether Water Margin is misogynistic. Beautiful seductresses are frequently positioned as a danger to masculine heroes in the novel. Especially notable is Pan Jinlian, the sister-in-law of Wu Song, who has later become an archetypal femme fatale and one of the most notorious villainesses of Chinese culture. Among women portrayed in a somewhat positive light, Gu Dasao and Sun Erniang are portrayed as extremely hideous and totally lacking in female charm, while the beautiful Hu Sanniang is married to a "short, ugly, and lustful" bandit. Sexual abstinence is seemingly required for membership in the brotherhood, as Song Jiang asserts that "in the gallant fraternity, anyone who 'wastes his marrow' (sex with women not for the purpose of reproduction) is a joke". The novel's theme tends to exclude the claims of family, especially those of women, and so it shows martial women (who fight for the interest of the group) prospering, and seductresses (who act for self-interest) meeting ghastly deaths.

Critics offer various explanations for Water Margin's prejudice against women. Most common among modern Chinese critics is the patriarchal society of the Imperial China, while Phillip S. Y. Sun of The Chinese University of Hong Kong argues that the hostility against women in the novel stems from a basic attitude that frowns upon amorous passion, and since passion is not good, charming women are received with suspicion and generally regarded as inauspicious. On the other hand, some have noted that Water Margin actually made great progress in understanding women's emotions compared to Song and Yuan huaben fictional books. According to Yenna Wu, Water Margin emerges as the first major Chinese novel that consciously uses extensive dream episodes as a literary and aesthetic device, and these dreams subvert the misogynistic tendencies in the narrative not only through their symbolic feminine aspects but also through positive feminine figures.

The novel is notable for its numerous violent plots and bloody and gruesome descriptions, including revenge killings, cases of indiscriminate slaughter, and the frenzied bloodlust of some heroes such as Li Kui. When celebrating a victory, as educator William Sin writes, some protagonists sometimes "share their enemies' flesh piece by piece, an action combining cannibalism with lingchi", the slow slicing of somebody to death. This type of violent imagery in the novel is mentioned in a "causal tone", with human flesh being eaten not just "in acts of revenge", but also "as a way of living". Noting that the outlaws celebrated in the novel were nevertheless widely regarded as "heroes and heroines" over centuries, he states that one cannot divide "the meanings of [their] actions" from "the cultural background under which they [were] performed" and that it would be "hasty" to project concepts and values of today "onto the situation of a distant culture" where they may not have applied.

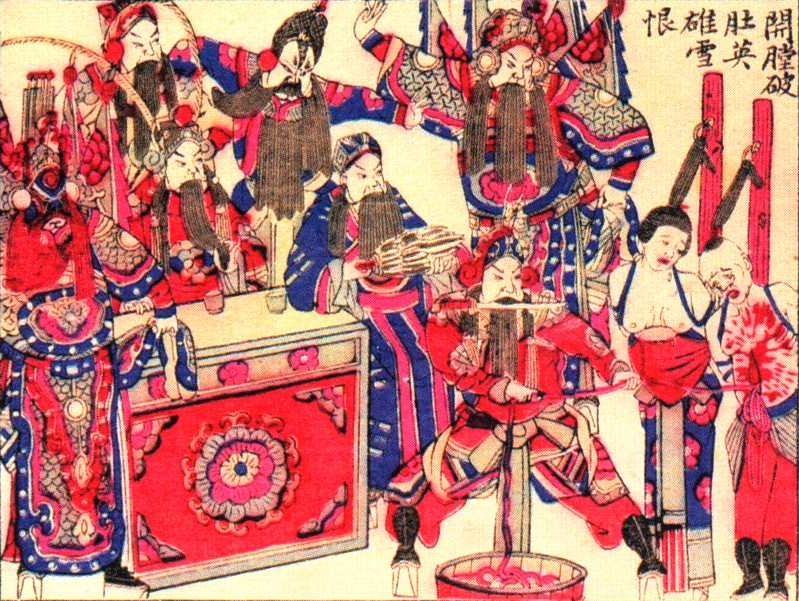
A woodblock print collected at the Shanghai History Museum depicts Lu Junyi disemboweling his steward and adulterous wife

Literary critic C. T. Hsia noted that, with all its affirmation of heroic ideals, its actual endorsement of savagery and sadism makes Water Margin a document of disturbing significance for the cultural historian of China. He stated that when such episodes were first told in the market place, they were meant to be entertainment, that the storytellers probably could see little difference between deeds of individual heroism and collective acts of sadistic punishment, and that its celebration of sadism is largely unselfconscious.

Liu Zaifu decries the novel as cultural poison, arguing that Water Margin, together with Romance of the Three Kingdoms, has sown people's "moral downfall". There is also a popular anecdotal quip in China which says, "The young should not read Water Margin while the old should not read Romance of the Three Kingdoms", criticizing its violent and machismo effects on young male audiences. By the late 19th century, the reformer Liang Qichao criticized Water Margin along with another novel, Dream of the Red Chamber as "incitement to robbery and lust". Liangyan Ge called it a novel "full of scenes of brutality and sadism, representing only one extremity of Chinese culture". Yu Xiangdou and Li Zhuowu justified the violence of Water Margin on political and moral grounds in their prefaces to the novel: Yu justified the actions of the heroes as righteous rebellion against the corruption of the Song dynasty officials, while Li centered on the notion that the novel was written "to give vent to deep indignation" at the historical tragedy that befell the northern Song. Ryūnosuke Akutagawa in 1922 wrote:

"Shuihu-esque" is a kind of Chinese philosophical insight. It says that the 108 haohan weren't the loyal men of valor that Bakin, for example, made them out to be. No, they were just a bunch of hoodlums from start to finish. But they didn't come together just because they delighted in evil. … Among the Liangshan group there was a mind-set that said mere questions of good and evil were there to be trampled underfoot. Even a career military man like Lin Chong or a compulsive gambler like Bai Sheng could be a brother as long as they adopted that mind-set. It's a kind of "supramoral" philosophy that's not limited just to the characters in the novel. It has always had a strong root in the Chinese mindset—at least when compared with us Japanese.

== Authorship ==
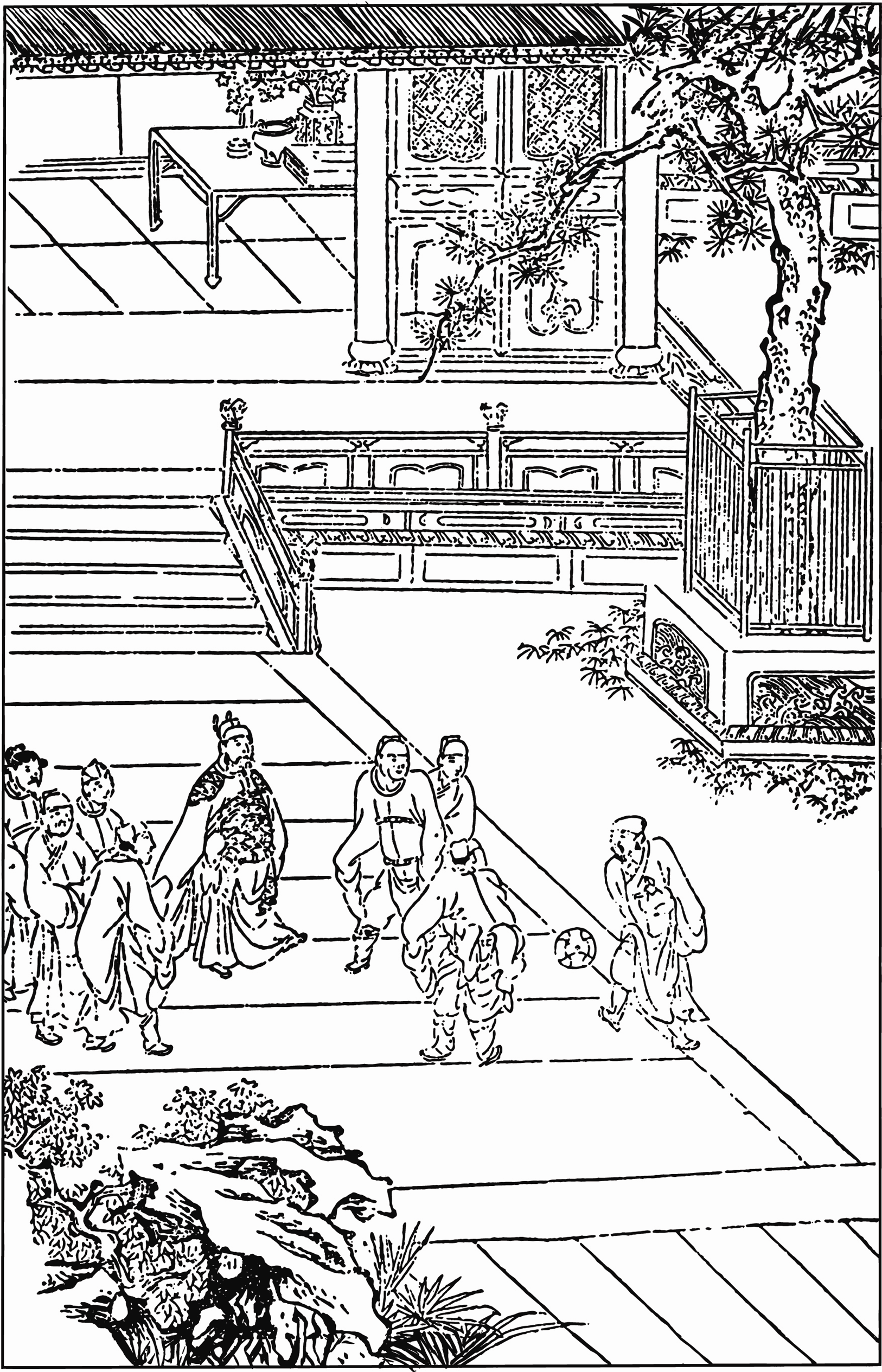
Illustration of a game of cuju from Water Margin, from a 15th-century woodcut edition.

While the book's authorship is traditionally attributed to Shi Nai'an, there is an extensive academic debate on what historical events the author had witnessed that inspired him to write the book, which forms a wider debate on when the book was written. Ming dynasty sources place Shi as a Yuan writer from Qiantang (modern Hangzhou), but reveal little about him, and there is a considerable gap between the assumed dates of the author and the earliest records about him. The first external reference of this book, which dated to 1524 during a discussion among Ming dynasty officials, is a reliable evidence because it presents strong falsifiability. Other scholars put the date to the mid-14th century, sometime between the fall of the Mongol-ruled Yuan dynasty and the early Ming dynasty.

Since fiction was not at first a prestigious genre in the Chinese literary world, authorship of early novels was often not carefully attributed and may be unknowable. The authorship of Water Margin is still in some sense uncertain, and the text in any case derived from many sources and involved many editorial hands. Recent scholars think that the novel, or portions of it, may have been written or revised by Luo Guanzhong (the author of Romance of the Three Kingdoms). Most modern Chinese critics see the novel as either written by Shi Nai'an, or written collectively.

=== Shi Nai'an ===
Many scholars believe that the first 70 chapters were indeed written by Shi Nai'an; however the authorship of the final 30 chapters is often questioned, with some speculating that it was instead written by Luo Guanzhong, who may have been a student of Shi. In the bibliographic entry in Baichuan Shuzhi (百川書志) compiled by the Jiajing-period author Gao Ru (高儒) in 1540, "Shi Nai'an from Qiantang" is credited with the original version of the novel, and Luo Guanzhong is credited with the finished form.

In the earlier Ming dynasty Water Margin editions preceding Jin Shengtan's, the title pages usually state "compiled by Shi Nai'an, edited by Luo Guanzhong" (施耐庵集撰 羅貫中纂修), but never any terms that denote original composition. With the exception of the reference in Baichuan Shuzhi, Shi was as a rule mentioned only in a subsidiary capacity, until Jin Shengtan's inclusion of an alleged preface by Shi in his edition established the claim of Shi's sole authorship for the succeeding centuries. Among philologists nowadays there has hardly remained any doubt about Jin's actual authorship of this preface, and Jin's contemporary Zhou Lianggong (1612–1672), in a short account about Water Margin, noted that:

Recently, Jin Shengtan cut away everything after chapter seventy which he considered a sequel added by Luo [Guanzhong]. For this reason he slandered Luo in extreme terms, moreover, he faked a Shi [Nai'an] preface which he placed in the front, [thus putting forward the view that] this book accordingly was Shi's. I say: Where in the world would there be someone who makes such a book! And back then he even dared to reveal his true name! This leaves open quite a few questions. I don't know on what basis the authorship of [Shi] Nai'an could be established.

=== Luo Guanzhong ===
Some believe that Water Margin was written entirely by Luo Guanzhong. Wang Daokun (汪道昆), who lived during the reign of the Jiajing Emperor in the Ming dynasty, first mentioned in Classification of Water Margin (水滸傳敘) that: "someone with the family name Luo, who was a native of Wuyue (Yue (a reference to the southern China region covering Zhejiang), wrote the 100-chapter novel." Several scholars from the Ming and Qing dynasties, after Wang Daokun's time, also said that Luo was the author of Water Margin. During the early Republican era, Lu Xun and Yu Pingbo suggested that the simplified edition of Water Margin was written by Luo, while the traditional version was written by Shi Nai'an.

Hu Yinglin (1551-1602) denies Luo a role in the composition of Water Margin, as he considers Romance of the Three Kingdoms to be vastly inferior to Water Margin, and therefore suggests that Water Margin was written by Shi Nai'an and that Romance of the Three Kingdoms was a poor emulation of it by Shi Nai'an's disciple, Luo Guanzhong.

Huikang Yesou (惠康野叟) in Shi Yu (識餘) disagree with Wang Daokun's view on the grounds that there were significant differences between Water Margin and Romance of the Three Kingdoms, therefore these two novels could not have been written by the same person.

Hu Shih felt that the draft of Water Margin was done by Luo Guanzhong, and could have contained the chapters on the outlaws' campaigns against Tian Hu, Wang Qing and Fang La, but not invaders from the Liao dynasty.

=== Shi Hui ===
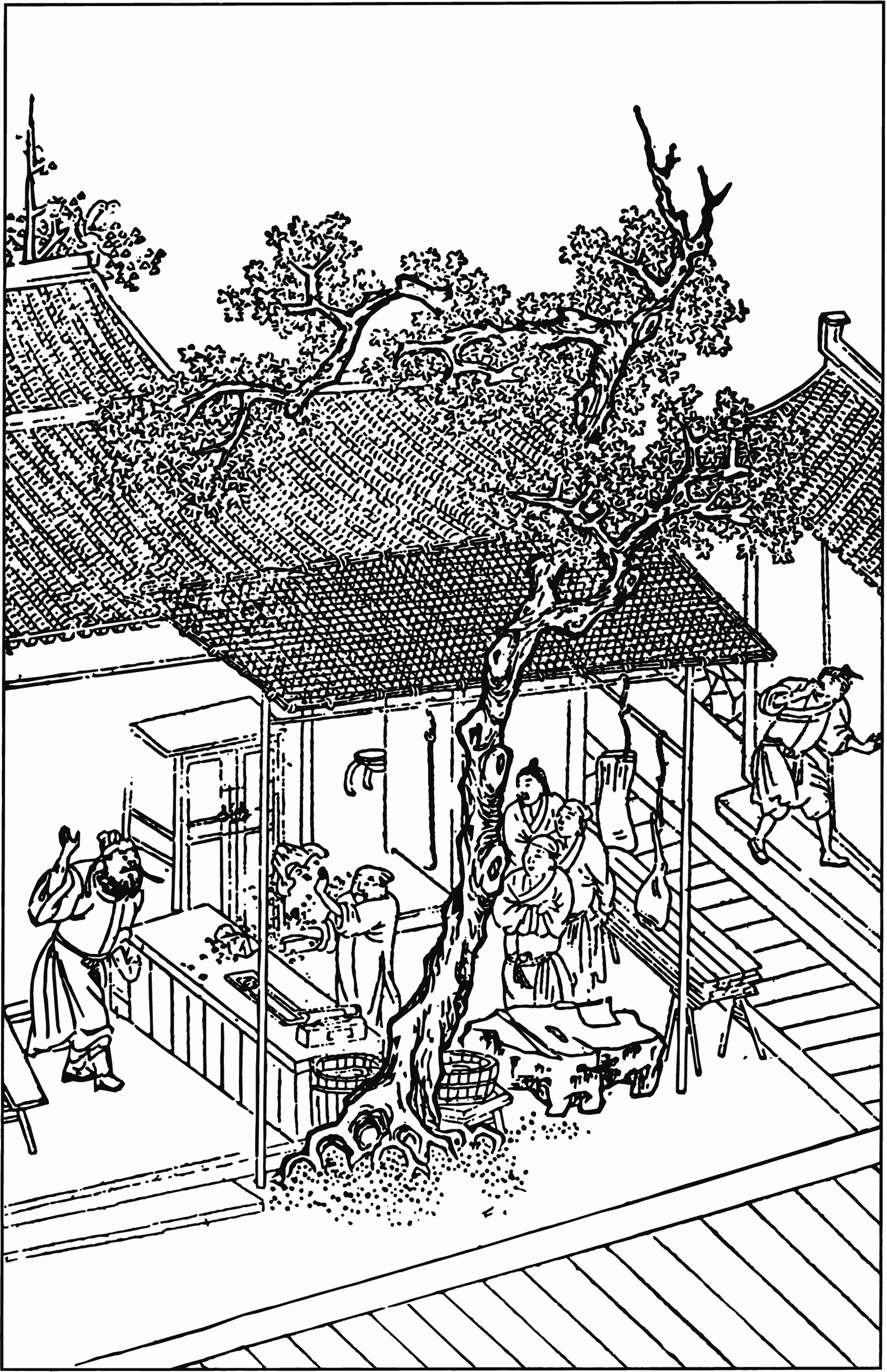
Illustration from a 15th-century woodcut edition

Another candidate is Shi Hui (施惠), a nanxi (southern opera) playwright who lived between the late Yuan dynasty and early Ming dynasty. Xu Fuzuo (徐復祚) of the Ming dynasty mentioned in Sanjia Cunlao Weitan (三家村老委談) that Junmei (君美; Shi Hui's courtesy name)'s intention in writing Water Margin was to entertain people, and not to convey any message. During the Qing dynasty, Shi Hui and Shi Nai'an were linked, suggesting that they are actually the same person. An unnamed writer wrote in Chuanqi Huikao Biaomu (傳奇會考標目) that Shi Nai'an's given name was actually "Hui", courtesy name "Juncheng" (君承), and he was a native of Hangzhou. Sun Kaidi (孫楷第) also wrote in Bibliography of Chinese Popular Fiction that "Nai'an" was Shi Hui's pseudonym. Later studies revealed that Water Margin contained lines in the Jiangsu and Zhejiang variety of Chinese, and that You Gui Ji (幽闺记), a work of Shi Hui, bore some resemblance to Water Margin, hence the theory that Water Margin was authored by Shi Hui.

=== Guo Xun ===
Some early scholars attributed the authorship to Guo Xun (郭勛), a politician who lived in the Ming dynasty. Shen Defu (沈德符), a late Ming dynasty scholar, mentioned in Wanli Yehuo Bian (萬曆野獲編) that Guo wrote Water Margin. Shen Guoyuan (沈國元) added in Huangming Congxin Lu (皇明從信錄) that Guo mimicked the writing styles of Romance of the Three Kingdoms and Water Margin to write Guochao Yinglie Ji (國朝英烈記). Qian Xiyan (錢希言) also stated in Xi Gu (戲嘏) that Guo edited Water Margin before. Hu Shih countered in his Research on Water Margin (水滸傳新考) that Guo Xun's name was used as a disguise for the real author of Water Margin. Dai Bufan (戴不凡) had a differing view, as he suspected that Guo wrote Water Margin, and then used "Shi Nai'an" to conceal his identity as the author of the novel.

== Editions and translations ==
Evolution of Water Margin editions

Water Margin ancient edition
Full recension ancient edition	Simpler recension ancient edition
Capital edition of The Tale of the Loyal and Righteous
Jiajing Fragmentary edition
Rongyu Hall edition
Zhongde Book Hall edition
Shiqu Pavilion Supplementary Print edition	Zhong Bojing edition	Three Great Bandits edition
Daduo Yuren Preface edition (Li Xuanbo Original Collection, Mustard Seed Garden, Sanduo Studio)	Illustrated Augmented edition	Pinglin edition, First/Second Carving Heroes' Register
120 Chapters edition (Complete Biography, Complete Book)	Liu Xingwo edition
70 Chapters edition (Jin Shengtan Commentary, Wang Wangru Commentary, Juqu Waishi Preface)	30 Volumes edition (Baohan Tower, Yingxue Thatched Hall)	Liguan Hall edition	Munich edition
Li Yu Preface edition
10 Volumes edition	Han-Song Rare Books edition (Wenyuan Hall, Qinxian Hall)	Campaigns Against the Four Bandit Groups edition
124 Chapters edition	8 Volumes edition

The textual history of the novel is extraordinarily complex for there are early editions of varying lengths, different parts, and variations. The scholar Scott Gregory comments that the text could be freely altered by later editors and publishers who also could add prefaces or commentaries. Not until the early 20th-century were there studies which began to set these questions in order, and there is still disagreement. The earliest components of the Water Margin (in manuscript copies) were from the late 14th century. A printed copy dating from the Jiajing reign (1521–1567) titled Jingben Zhongyi Zhuan (京本忠義傳, 'Capital edition of The Tale of the Loyal and Righteous'), is preserved in the Shanghai Library. The majority of scholars working in this field posit that significant changes were made to the text in the various 16th-century editions.

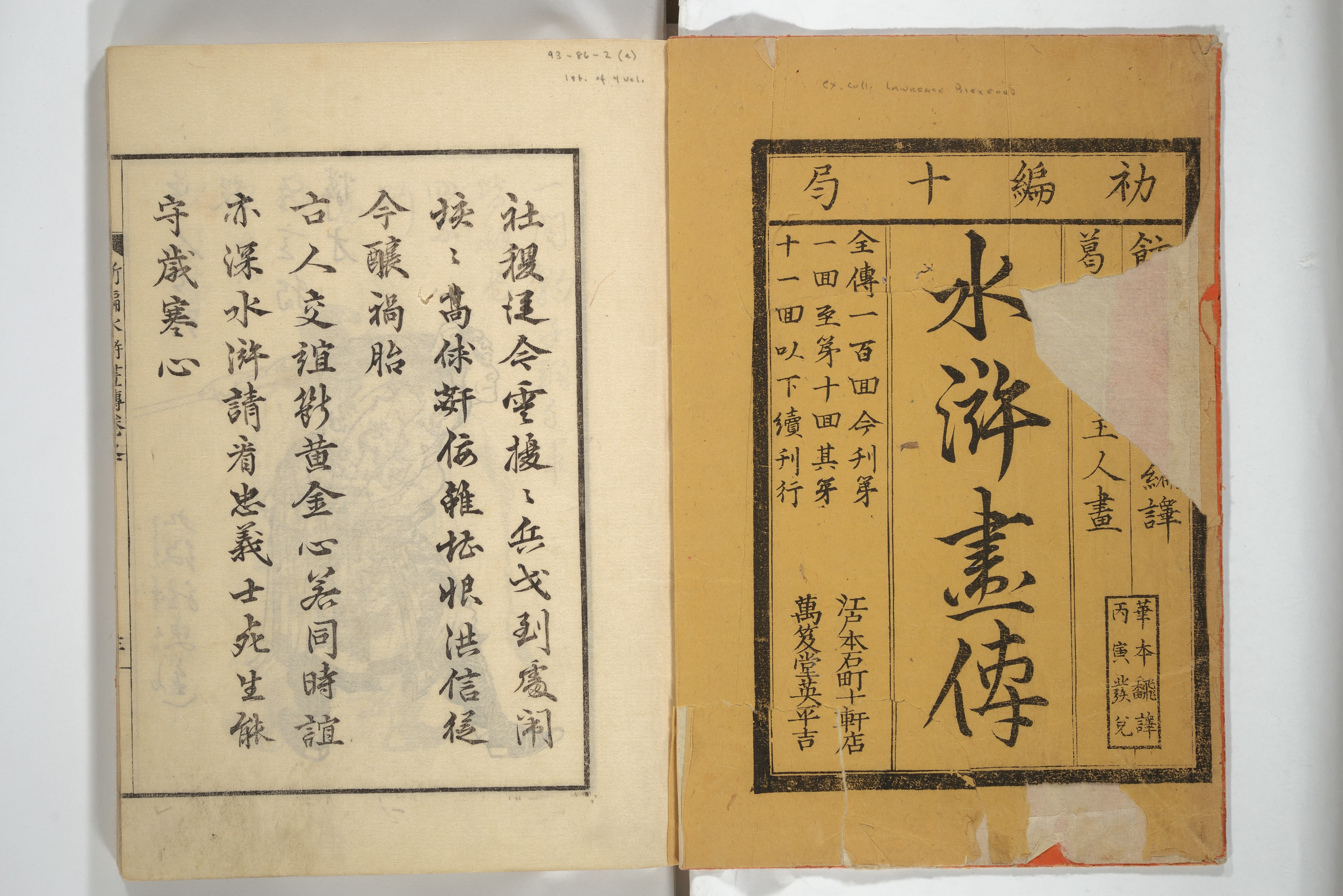
Pages of an illustrated woodblock version of Water Margin by Hokusai, 1805–1838, from the Metropolitan Museum of Art

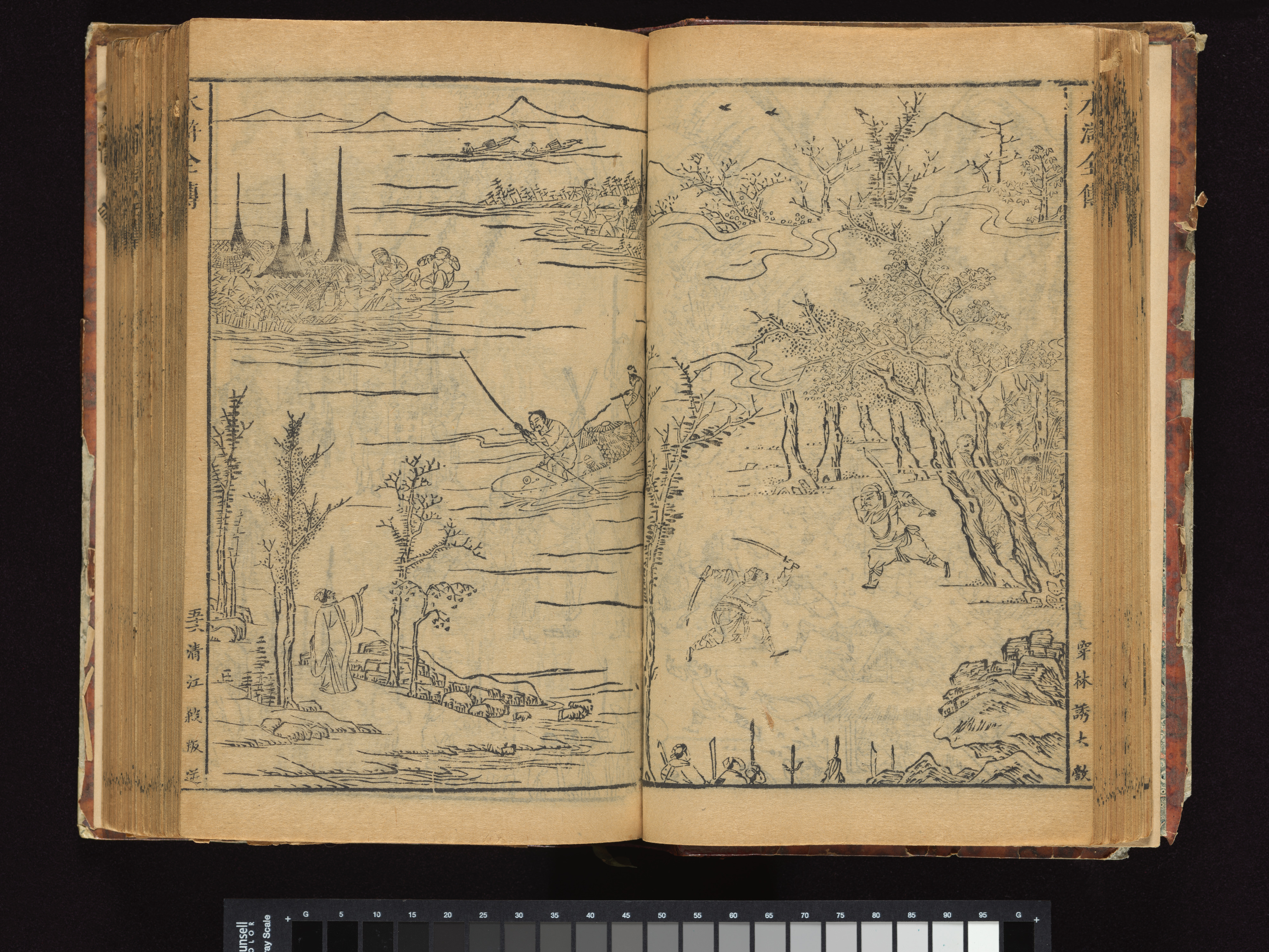
Illustrations in a 1610 edition of the novel depicting Wang Qing crossing the river, from the Metropolitan Museum of Art

Pages from volume six of the novel in an edition collected by the Tianjin Library

The earliest extant complete printed edition of Water Margin is a 100-chapter version published in 1589. Its preface, attributed to Tiandu Foreign Minister, praises the novel as a "national medicine". He also claims that its text is a reconstruction of a Jiajing-era Guo Xun (郭勋) edition, which was purportedly superior to other editions then circulating, and laments the poor quality of recent editions of the novel, the texts of which have been ruined by poor editing and the addition of spurious material by unnamed "village pedants". Recent researchers argue that the text of the Rongyu tang edition, thought to have been produced in the late Wanli era (1573–1620), could not be later than the Jiajing era, and is closest to the partially survived Jiajing edition, which now consists of chapters 47–55 only.

Using the edition published by Guo Xun, the marquis of Wuding, Yu Xiangdou brought out a shorter version of the book in 1590 which included two new sections on the expeditions against the rebels Tian Hu and Wang Qing. These additions suffered drastic revision in subsequent, improved editions of the novel because they were "too inferior to occupy such a prominent place in the expanded version". The 120-chapter Yang Dingjian (楊定見) preface edition of the novel, published by Yuan Wuya (袁無涯), appeared in 1612 or slightly earlier under the title Shuihu quanzhuan (水滸全傳; 'The Complete Water Margin Saga').

One of the most widely read versions is a truncated recension published by Jin Shengtan in 1643, reprinted many times, which became a standard text for later editions and many translations. Jin provided three introductions that praised the novel as a work of genius and inserted commentaries into the text that explained how to read the novel. He cut matter that he thought irrelevant, reduced the number of chapters to 70 by turning chapter 1 into a prologue, and added an ending in which all 108 heroes are executed. There is general agreement that by casting aside the theme of the rebels' pacification, which dominates the dramatic action in the last fifty chapters, Jin revealed his own loyalist ideology and feudalistic moral sensibility. A variety of Water Margin editions were made available for the "Criticize Water Margin Campaign" in 1975, including the Ming dynasty Rongyu tang edition republished by the People's Literature Publishing House. Since then, the 100- and 120-chapter versions have replaced the Jin edition as the most widely circulated editions for mass consumption.

There are two recensions of Water Margin: the "full recension" and the "simpler recension". The latter editions, edited for less sophisticated audiences, can contain all the events but in less detail. There is no way of knowing whether a simpler edition came before or was derived from another by adding or cutting text.

=== Simpler recension ===
The simpler-recension editions (簡本, jianben or chien-pen) include stories on the outlaws being granted amnesty, followed by their campaigns against the Liao dynasty, Tian Hu, Wang Qing and Fang La, all the way until Song Jiang's death.

Known simpler recension of Water Margin include:

- A 115-chapter edition, Masterpieces of the Han and Song dynasties (漢宋奇書)
- A 110-chapter edition, Register of Heroes (英雄譜)
- A 164-chapter edition, combined with Sequel to Water Margin
- A 109-chapter edition, 2-Carved Heroes' Compendium
- A 124-chapter version, Daodao Tang Edition
- A 104-chapter edition, Water Margin Chronicles Commentary

=== Full recension ===
The full-recension editions (繁本, fanben or fan-pen) are more descriptive and circulated more widely than their simplified counterparts. The three main versions of the full recension are a 100-chapter, a 120-chapter and a 70-chapter edition. The most commonly modified parts of the full recension are the stories on what happened after the outlaws are granted amnesty.

- 100-chapter edition: Includes the outlaws' campaigns against the Liao dynasty and Fang La after they have been granted amnesty.
- 120-chapter edition: An extended version of the 100-chapter edition, includes the outlaws' campaigns against Tian Hu and Wang Qing (chapters 91 to 110).
- 71-chapter edition: Edited by Jin Shengtan in the late Ming dynasty, this edition uses chapter 1 as a prologue and ends at chapter 71 of the original version, and does not include the stories about the outlaws being granted amnesty and their campaigns.

=== Non-English translations ===
Water Margin has been translated into many languages, including German, Italian, Russian, Latin, Mongolian, Uyghur, Kazakh, Tibetan, and Korean. The book was translated into Manchu as Möllendorff: Sui hū bithe. In 1753, the Qianlong Emperor's imperial edict prohibited the translation of the novel into Manchu language for it and some other popular novels in Chinese that had been translated into Manchu "deteriorated the purity and nature of the Manchus". In the following year, at the suggestion of the Investigating censor Hu Ding (胡定, 1709-1789), the scope of the ban on the novel was further expanded to include all languages. Jacques Dars translated the 70 chapter version into French in 1978, reprinted several times. The book was first translated into Thai in 1867, originally in Samud Thai (Thai paper book) format, consisting of 82 volumes in total. It was printed in western style in 1879 and distributed commercially by Dan Beach Bradley, an American Protestant missionary to Siam.

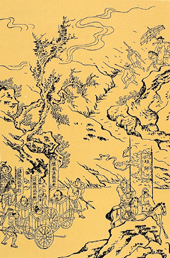
An illustration of the novel from an early Qing edition

Japanese translations date back to at least 1757, when the first volume of an early Suikoden (Water Margin rendered in Japanese) was printed. In 1805, Kyokutei Bakin released a Japanese translation of the Water Margin illustrated by Hokusai. The book, called the New Illustrated Edition of the Suikoden (Shinpen Suikogaden), was a success during the Edo period and spurred a Japanese "Suikoden" craze.

In 1827, publisher Kagaya Kichibei commissioned Utagawa Kuniyoshi to produce a series of woodblock prints illustrating the 108 heroes in Water Margin. The 1827–1830 series, called 108 Heroes of the Water Margin or Tsuzoku Suikoden goketsu hyakuhachinin no hitori, catapulted Kuniyoshi to fame. It also brought about a craze for multicoloured pictorial tattoos that covered the entire body from the neck to the mid-thigh.

Following the great commercial success of the Kuniyoshi series, other ukiyo-e artists were commissioned to produce prints of the Water Margin heroes, which began to be shown as Japanese heroes rather than the original Chinese personages.

Among these later series was Yoshitoshi's 1866–1867 series of 50 designs in Chuban size, which are darker than Kuniyoshi's and feature strange ghosts and monsters. A recent Japanese translation is Suikokuden 水滸伝. Translated by Yoshikawa Kojiro; Shimizu Shigeru. Iwanami Shoten. 16 October 1998.

=== English translations ===
In the late Qing Dynasty, missionaries and scholars in China such as E. C. Bridgman, Alexander Wylie, S. W. William, Herbert Giles, Harry Parkes and others successively published introductions of characters or book reviews on the novel Water Margin. In 1872–1873, the first partial English translation of Water Margin was serialized and published in The China Review.

==== 71-chapter version ====
The proof of the novel's greatness is in this timelessness. It is as true today as it was dynasties ago. The people of China still march across its pages, priests and courtesans, merchants and scholars, women good and bad, old and young, and even naughty little boys.

— Pearl Buck, 1938 Nobel Prize in Literature lecture

Abridged

1. Pearl S. Buck was the first English translator of the entire 71-chapter version. Titled All Men are Brothers and published in 1933. It was revised in 1937 including the Introduction/Foreword attributed to Shi Naian. The book was well received by the American public, but also criticised for its errors, such as the mistranslation of Lu Zhishen's nickname "Flowery Monk" as "Priest Hwa" and Sun Erniang's "Female Yaksha" as "Night Ogre". Lu Xun argued that the title of the translation was unsuitable because "the idea of 'brothers' failed to accurately capture the precise meaning of the novel".
2. In 1937, another complete translation appeared, titled Water Margin, by J. H. Jackson, edited by Fang Lo-Tien. A translation of Jin's Preface was published in 1935 by the Shanghai journal, The China Critic.

Unabridged

- The J. H. Jackson translation was revised, restored, and updated by Edwin H. Lowe in 2009 and published by Tuttle Classics.

==== 100-chapter version ====
Later translations of the 71-chapter version include Chinese-naturalised scholar Sidney Shapiro's Outlaws of the Marsh (1980) that also does not include the verse. However, as it was published during the Cultural Revolution, this edition received little attention then. It is a translation of a combination of both the 71-chapter and 100-chapter versions.

==== 120-chapter version ====
The most recent translation, titled The Marshes of Mount Liang (1994–2002), by Alex and John Dent-Young, is a five-volume translation of the 120-chapter version. It includes a prologue but omits the foreword by Shi Nai'an and some passages related to the official details of the Ming dynasty.

==== Differences ====
These translations differ in the selection of texts and completeness. The Jackson and the revised Buck translations of 1937 contain the foreword attributed to Shi Nai'an as does the restored 2010 edition. The Shapiro translation incorporates the prologue into chapter 1 but omits the foreword and most of the poems. The Dent-Young translation omits the author's foreword and the passages concerning the Ming dynasty administration and the translators admitted to compromising some details and retaining inconsistencies in their Brief Note on the Translation.

== Sequels and spinoffs ==
The number of published and circulated sequels to Water Margin that appeared from the Ming dynasty to the Republican period has reached sixteen, one of the highest numbers in the history of Chinese fiction. Some tell subsequent stories of the heroes fighting the Jurchen-ruled Jin dynasty, infighting of the heroes, or moving to Siam. There is also a so-called "sequel" attributed to Luo Guanzhong, the 49-chapter Zheng Sikou (征四寇 Campaigns Against the Four Bandit Groups), which is actually the second half of the 115-chapter simpler-text version issued as a separate book.

=== Jin Ping Mei ===
Jin Ping Mei is an erotic novel of manners written under the pen-name Lanling Xiaoxiao Sheng (蘭陵笑笑生) ("The Scoffing Scholar of Lanling") in the latter half of the 16th century. The novel is framed as a spinoff of Water Margin based on the story of Wu Song avenging his brother in Water Margin, but the focus is on Ximen Qing's sexual relations with other women, including Pan Jinlian. The intervening sections, however, differ in almost every way from Water Margin. In the course of the novel, Ximen has 19 sexual partners, including his six wives and mistresses, and a male servant.

Scholars generally consider the book as the first Chinese novel that was wholly the creation of one author and had no antecedent in the oral tradition. The influential author Lu Xun, writing in the 1920s, called it "the most famous of the novels of manners" of the Ming dynasty, and reported the opinion of the Ming dynasty critic, Yuan Hongdao, that it was "a classic second only to Water Margin." He added that the novel is "in effect a condemnation of the whole ruling class."

=== Shuihu Houzhuan ===
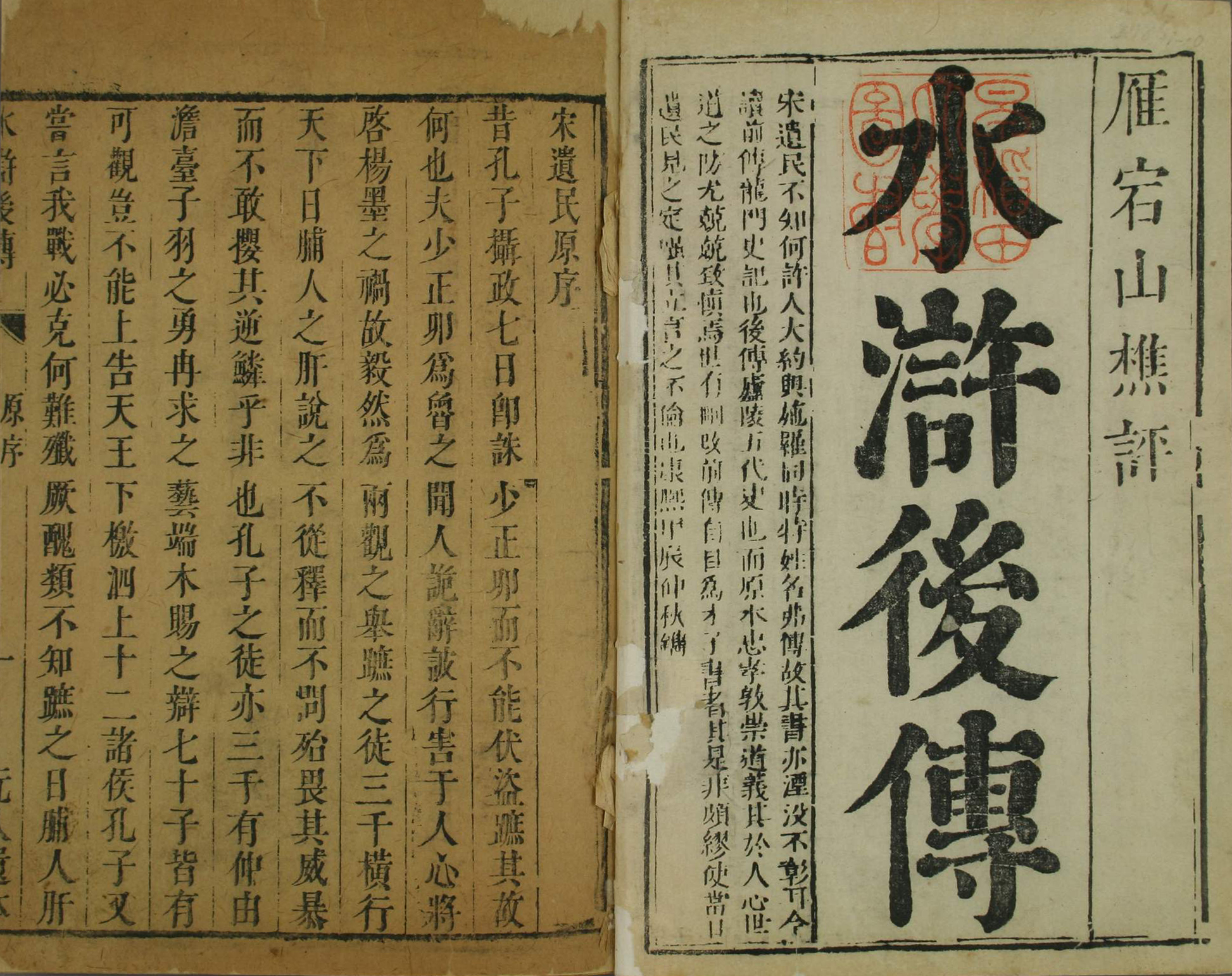
An image of the novel Shuihu Houzhuan (The Later Story of Water Margin), published in the third year of the Kangxi reign of the Qing dynasty (1664)

A sequel to Water Margin titled Shuihu Houzhuan (水滸後傳) (The Later Story of Water Margin) that authored by Chen Chën, a writer from the early era Qing dynasty and native of Zhejiang, was released In 1664.

Shuihu Houzhuan comprises 40 chapters, organized into two parts. Its plot diverges somewhat from the original Water Margin. The first 30 chapters focus on the chaotic state of China, with the Liangshan heroes gradually assembling, reaching a total of 32 by the 29th chapter. The final 10 chapters depict the heroes' decision to journey to a foreign land, where they encounter a wise monarch and benevolent people, leading to a joyful conclusion. Shuihu Houzhuan also introduces new characters such as Hua Rong's son Hua Fengchun (花逢春), Xu Ning's son Xu Sheng (徐晟) and Huyan Zhuo's son Huyan Yu (呼延鈺).

==== Plot ====
The story started with Ruan Xiaoqi, falsely accused of treason by corrupt officials Tong Guan and Cai Jing after wearing Fang La's discarded dragon robe. Returning to Shijie Village, he kills Cai Jing's ally Zhang Ganban and flees, joining former Liangshan heroes like Hu Cheng and Luan Tingyu in banditry.

Meanwhile, Li Jun and seven others, disillusioned with China's chaos after the Northern Song's fall, sail to Siam (historical Thailand), conquer Jin'ao Island, and ally themselves with the royal family. Thirty-two surviving Liangshan heroes regroup in Shandong and Hebei and later join Li Jun in Siam during a siege. In the chapter 35, an army of 10,000 Japanese warriors embarked from Satsuma Domain and Ōsumi provinces aboard 300 warships to aid a usurper in Siam against the Liangshan heroes. The figure leading the Japanese army is called Kanpaku. The Kanpaku is depicted as eight shaku (approximately 2.4 meters) tall and riding an elephant. He also commands a naval warfare unit known as the 'Kurooni' (Black Ghosts). However, the entire army meets its end by freezing to death due to Gongsun Sheng's sorcery. The Liangshan heroes manages to defeat the usurper Gong Tao, and Li Jun becomes the king of Siam.

Later, Li Jun rescues Southern Song Emperor Gaozong, who pardons the heroes and recognizes Li Jun's rule. Under Li Jun, Siam adopts Chinese influences, and the 32 heroes marry and settle happily.

==== English translation ====
Chen Chen's sequel was translated as Water Margin Sequel by Valentin Saric and published in May 2026.

==== Receptions and themes ====
The author, Chen Chen, was known for his resentment towards the rule of Qing and joined the Jingyin Poetry society, together with many loyal to Ming like Gu Yanwu. Later, he published the sequel in 1664. Chen Chen took the pen name "Yandang Shanqiao" and giving commentary for the published edition and claimed the original script was written by an anonymous "loyalist of Song" who lived during the early years of Yuan dynasty rule.

According to Hu Shih, the theme of this sequel work reflects Chen Chen's grief and anger about the fall of Ming dynasty, which he analogizes with the fall of Northern Song to the Yuan dynasty, which is the backdrop era of the Water Margin story. The novel also continues to promote the themes of loyalty and resistance to foreign aggression through rebellion. However, the methods of these reformed Liangshan heroes in Siam are very different from that of the original group, as they resorted to less violence, held family happiness in high regard and showed awareness of the importance of civil government system; which followed by setting their end goal in establishing a state in Siam. In the end, the work expresses the hopes, fears and resentment of the Ming loyalists, and the anti-Qing movement.

Furthermore, the book's poems reveal the author's desire to establish a new utopia for Ming loyalists in a foreign land and may allude to their hopes for Zheng Chenggong's regime in Taiwan.

Overall, Hu Shih does not rate this sequel work with high praise, with the exception of some of its chapters which stand out from others, such as "Zhongmu County's Elimination of Traitors" in volume 22. The book also described Yan Qing's visit to Emperor Huizong of Song , which was written in a sad and touching way, far surpassing the other chapters. Sinologist Ellen Widmer believed that the literary value of the Shuihu Houzhuan was mixed and not enough to be included in the list of first-rate classics. The work directly influenced the 19th-century Japanese novel Chinsetsu Yumiharizuki (also known as Crescent Moon in English) by Takizawa Bakin, who maintains that the Houzhuan makes sense of Water Margin's moral disorder, and proposes that readers think of the two novels as a single work.

=== Dangkou Zhi ===
Dangkou Zhi (蕩寇志 The suppression of the bandits), which also known for its alternate title Jie shuihu quanzhuan (結水滸全傳 Terminating the Complete Saga of the Water Margin), is a novel written by Qing dynasty novelist Yu Wanchun (俞萬春) during the reign of the Daoguang Emperor. The story follows the end of original Water Margin runs im chapter 70. The book runs from Chapter 71 to Chapter 140, totaling 70 chapters, with a concluding chapter titled "The Conclusion to the Son". It took him 22 years to complete the book.

Yu Wanchun disagreed that the Liangshan outlaws are loyal and righteous heroes, and was determined to portray them as ruthless mass murderers and destroyers, hence he wrote Dangkou Zhi. As a result, he portrays the Liangshan outlaws here as the antagonists, only to be eliminated by the designated protagonists. Yu and the Dangkou zhi commentators aim to shape Water Margin into a cautionary tale against rebellion by properly terminating the Liangshan "bandit resistance movement", with the effect of "rectifying" the meaning of zhongyi.

The novel, which starts at the Grand Assembly of the 108 outlaws at Liangshan Marsh, tells of how the outlaws plundered and pillaged cities before they are eventually eliminated by government forces led by Zhang Shuye (張叔夜) and his lieutenants Chen Xizhen (陳希真) and Yun Tianbiao (雲天彪). The protagonist of this novel is Chen Xizhen, a Taoist and martial arts master who turned outlaw, and ended opposing the Liangshan outlaws led by Song Jian. This reflects the contradictory and tangled psychology of Yu Wanchun, who was a fan of Water Margin and wanted to inherit Jin Shengtan 's ideas to attack the rebels. As David Wang points out, contrary to Water Margin, which advocates "bandit" loyalty as an alternative ideology to the imperial mandate, the novel advocates unconditional loyalty to the imperial court and seeks to mix Western epistemology with ancient Daoist beliefs, historical saga with supernatural fantasy.

Due to its pro-establishment and anti-rebellion theme, this sequel was supported and endorsed by government of Qing. However, the Taiping rebels disliked the nuance of the novel and ordered the burning of the book in every place they occupied. Water Margin may also have inspired the novel Ernü Yingxiong Zhuan.

=== Can Shui Hu ===
A sequel novel which titled Can Shui Hu, or Water Margin Finale (殘水滸), was written by Cheng Shanzhi (pen name of Cheng Qingyu, 程慶餘; 1880–1942); a novelist associated with the Southern Society (南社) literary group. It was serialized in 1933 in the New Jiangsu Daily (《新江蘇日報》) under the pseudonym "Yi Su" (一粟), and reprinted by Heilongjiang People's Publishing House in 1997. The novel exists and is a well-documented sequel to the 70-chapter edition of Water Margin. It composed 16 chapters that followed the original simple Water Margin version of 70 chapters, spanning from chapter 71 to 86.

The narrative picks up directly from Lu Junyi's prophetic nightmare, followed by the split of the Liangshan brotherhood due to ideological rifts. the leaders divide into two camps over the issue whether they should surrender to the government and seek pardon, or keep being outlaws. Lu Junyi's faction (pro-surrender) seeks alliance with Northern Song border general named Zong Shidao (種師道). Song Jiang's faction, which composed of 36 core members, refused the integration aspiration by Lu Junyi, and clinging to their autonomy as outlaws. Some of the Liangshan heroes fell during the ensuing civil war, such as Li Kui's death by Hu Sanniang and Dong Ping's poisoning by Cheng Wanli's Daughter. After Liangshan's defeat, Song Jiang's faction flees to Haizhou (海州), where they are captured by Zhang Shuye (張叔夜), the historical Song general who subdued Song Jiang in 1121 (per History of Song). Lu's faction, honoring old bonds, petitions the court to spare Song's life—sparing execution but dooming the remnants to further tragedy. The book culminates in total annihilation: Surrenders lead to executions or exile, battles claim the rest, and Song Jiang is ultimately also implied being killed.

With the exception of Zhang Shuye and Chen Xiuzhen (who also the protagonist of Dangkou Zhi.), there are not many notable new characters in this novel. Yet, the personality of certain legacy characters are given more focus, such as Song Jiang 's cunning and Wu Yong's wisdom. Chen Xizhen and his daughter, Chen Liqing, were persecuted by the government, particularly by Gao Qiu and Gao Yanei. Both father and daughter were forced to fled the capital. However, Chen Xizhen also hated the Liangshan heroes and refused to join them. Later, Chen Xizhen occupied a village and gathered people to start an uprising, until he accepted the amnesty and surrendered to the government. He joined forces with Zhang Shuye and others in the suppression of Liangshan outlaws, until they manage to eliminate the group.

=== Other notable Water Margin sequels ===
Hou Shuihuzhuan (後水滸傳; "A Sequel to The Water Margin") was written by pseudonymous writer Qinglian shi zhuren (青蓮室主人; "Master of the Blue Lotus Chamber") and published during the Qianlong era (1736–1795). The story revolves around the early Southern Song rebel Yang Yao (楊幺; c. 1115–1135), who is described as the reincarnation of Song Jiang. He launched a peasant's revolt in the Dongting Lake to carry on and develop the career of Liangshan heroes. Chapters 31 to 45 of the novel depict general Yue Fei, portrayed as a divine general, suppresses the rebels at Caibo Bridge. Defeated, the heroes ascend to heaven, enlightened by a karmic epilogue emphasizing redemption through reincarnation. Ellen Widmer wrote that the novel "evidently belongs to a lower cultural level" than even the Houzhuan, but is more critical of the imperial system.

Lu Shi'e's humorous novel Xin Shuihu (New Water Margin, 1909) depicts the protagonists from the parent novel swiftly adjusting to the new world after hearing of "political reform", leaving their stronghold and getting involved in various modern enterprises.

The so-called 120-chapter Guben Shuihu zhuan ("Ancient Edition of Water Margin") first surfaced in 1933 with prefatory material by Mei Jihe (1891–1969) claiming that the manuscript on which it was based represented the entire novel as originally written by Shi Nai'an, with the first half being consistent with Jin Shengtan's version of and the second half continuing the story in accordance with the author's conception of Jin's attitude toward the rebels.

During the Second Sino-Japanese War, Zhang Henshui serialized a patriotic Water Margin sequel, A New Tale of the Water Margin (Shuihu Xin Zhuan, 1940–1943), which follows the former bandits as they join Song government troops against the Jin invaders.

== Influence and adaptations ==
=== Literature ===
These stories are told in articulate, vigorous language, its effectiveness well proven through a long process of oral tradition. … Only some of the Song-Yuan short stories can be compared with the Tale of the Marshes [Water Margin] in their skillful use of the colloquial, but the Marshes is the first sustained prose fiction that adopts the living language of the people as the medium of narration. It has set an example for all later novels and its influence is lasting and immense.

— Wu-chi Liu on the literary influence of the novel

Water Margin had a far-reaching impact on East Asian narrative literature. It became an "inexhaustible" source of inspiration for the adaptation and recreation of works in various literary forms across the region for centuries. Luo Yuming concludes that, because of its skillful use of the vernacular language, and the shifting towards a central focus on characterization in content, the novel "represented a record level in the progress" and "heralded the direction of the development" of fiction in China. Herbert Giles stated that the modern Chinese novel followed a succession of great works including Water Margin. Ellen Widmer calls Water Margin "noticeable for its rambunctiousness, its sense of structure, and its use of the spoken idiom", and each has played a role in the various texts it has influenced. She mentions that the Korean novel Hong Gildong jeon, which heavily draws from Water Margin, is easily identified as a descendant of the novel.

Modern Chinese scholars have recognized Water Margin as one of the first great masterpieces in a long line of novels which began with mass entertainment and progressed to include some of the finest literary products of later ages. Lee Fong-mao argues that the novel created a narrative mode of myths which marked the establishment of a literary genealogy of the unified formal structure in Ming-Qing fiction and inspired a trend in the writing of hagiographic novels on religious conversion. Victor H. Mair and Zhenjun Zhang wrote that, under the influence of Romance of the Three Kingdoms and Water Margin, many historical novels appeared in the middle and late periods of the Ming dynasty, some of which inspired the well-received Romance of the Sui and Tang. Richard James Havis in South China Morning Post described Water Margin as the most influential book in regards to heroic martial artists.

With the rise of the vernacular writing movement, the novel became an important model of vernacular writing, especially in schools where teachers used fragments from the book as instructional materials. The Shanghai modernist writers of the early 1930s, most notably Mu Shiying and Shi Zhecun, make intertextual references to the novel in their writings. Shi Zhecun's short story Shi Xiu (1931) "shocked Chinese readers in the early 1930s" because it delved into the psychology of sexual desire and recast Shi Xiu as a sadistic and voyeuristic bandit. War novels of the late 1940s in Communist-controlled China were largely modeled after Water Margin.

Scholars have long noted the importance of The Water Margin to the literary and visual culture of greater East Asia—especially Edo-period Japan, where the narrative was consumed in a dazzling panoply of translations, adaptations, parodies, spinoffs, woodblock illustrations, and even board games based (often, very tenuously) on the Chinese original. … Commentators such as Mori Ōgai (1862–1922), Tokutomi Sohō (1863–1957), Masaoka Shiki (1867–1902), Kano Naoki (狩野直喜) (1868–1947), and Akutagawa Ryūnosuke (1892–1927) informed their readers that The Water Margin provided a perfect "snapshot" of contemporary Chinese society, and the comparison between China and The Water Margin became de rigueur in Japanese literary travel documents of the period.

— William C. Hedberg on the influence of Water Margin on Japanese culture

Water Margin has also been identified as one of the most influential works in the development of early modern Japanese literature. Nan Ma Hartmann stated that in terms of the significance of its influence as a single work of foreign fiction, it is unrivaled by any other work in Japanese literary history. William C. Hedberg wrote that "It is difficult to exaggerate the importance of Chinese fiction and drama to the literary culture of early modern Japan ... From a certain vantage point, the Chinese novel Shuihu zhuan [Water Margin] is a ubiquitous presence in the literary and visual culture of early modern Japan." The earliest extant copy of Water Margin in Japan is the 1592 edition collected by Tenkai, abbot of the Tendai and adviser to the fledgling Tokugawa regime. Conventional literary histories of Japan have regarded the novel as central to the emergence of yomihon. The earliest yomihon novels by the late Japanese yomihon representative writers, Santō Kyōden and Kyokutei Bakin, all were references to Water Margin.

Haruo Shirane pointed out that as a result of the Kansei Reforms in the 1790s, writers and readers had to develop new forms, other than sharebon and kibyoshi, that would avoid censorship. This need was answered by various Japanese adaptations of Water Margin, beginning with Takebe Ayatari's's Honchō Suikoden (Japanese Water Margin, 1773). The group of adapted works is known as Suikodenmono (水滸伝もの). By the Meiji Restoration, there were over twenty similar adaptations, the magnum opus being Hakkenden by Bakin. Meiji-period Japanese readers hailed the gritty mimesis and dialogue of Water Margin as uncannily proto-modern attempts at peak Western literature-level "naturalism".

Notable Japanese Water Margin variations after the 1920s include Eiji Yoshikawa's Shin Suikoden and Kenzo Kitakata's Suikoden, the latter of which has sold more than 11.6 million copies in Japan, and its TV adaptation premiered in February 2026 on Wowow and Lemino.

The Water Outlaws, a novel by S. L. Huang, is a gender-flipped version of the story in which many of the outlaws are queer women. Rise of the Water Margin (水滸再起) is a cyber-thriller novel launched in 2022 by the American author Christopher Bates in which all of the Chinese characters and their approximate character arcs are 21st century modernizations of people in Water Margin. Frank Chin's novel, Donald Duk, contains many references to the Water Margin. Song Jiang and Li Kui make several appearances in the protagonist's dreams.

=== Comics ===
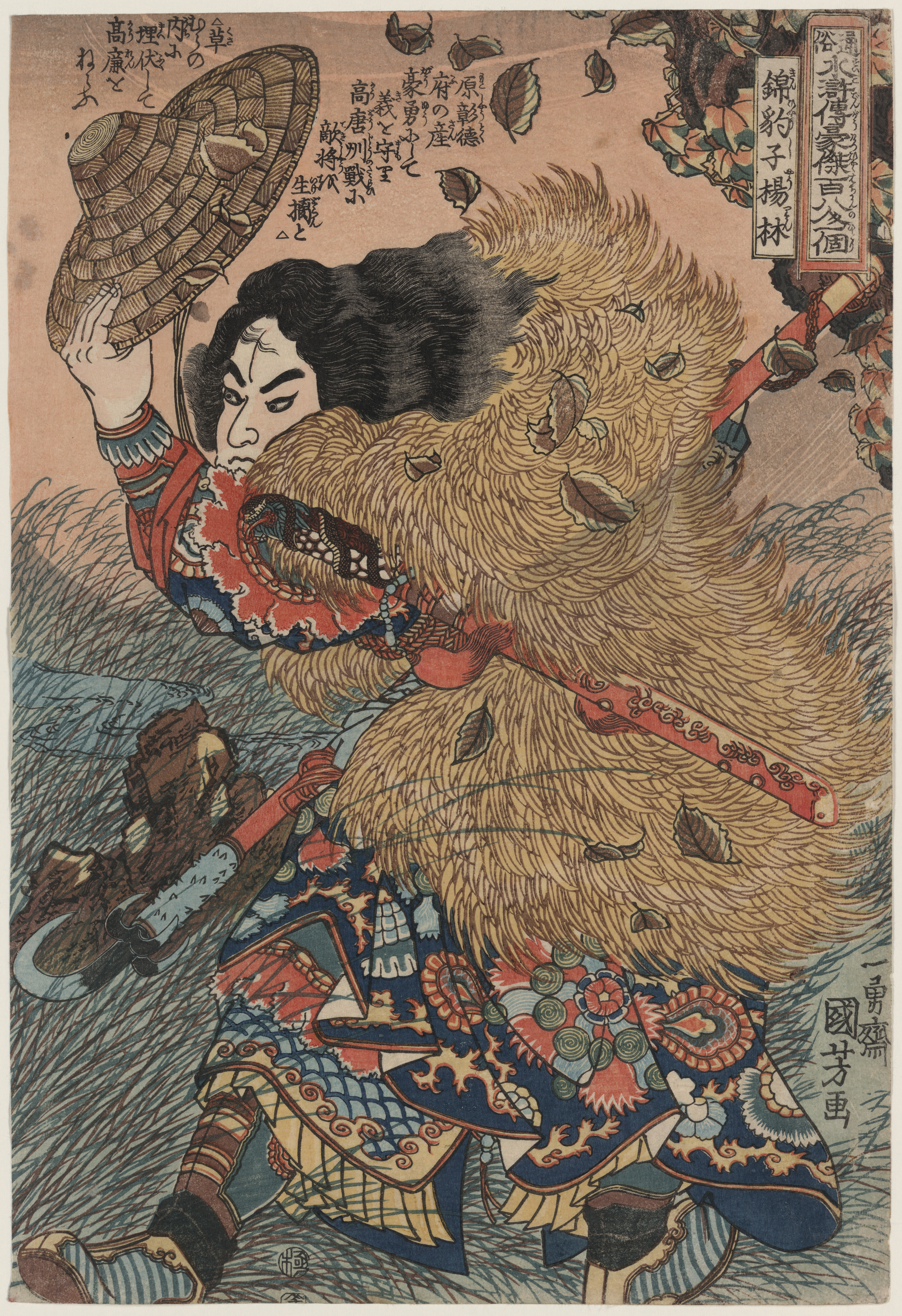
Yang Lin, a hero from the novel, from Utagawa Kuniyoshi's series of woodblock prints illustrating the 108 Suikoden

Water Margin is referred to in numerous Japanese manga, such as Tetsuo Hara and Buronson's Fist of the North Star, and Masami Kurumada's Fūma no Kojirō, Otokozaka and Saint Seiya. In both works of fiction, characters bearing the same stars of the Water Margin characters as personal emblems of destiny are featured prominently. A Japanese manga called Akaboshi: Ibun Suikoden, based on the story of Water Margin, was serialised in Weekly Shonen Jump.

A Hong Kong manhua series based on Water Margin was also created by the artist Lee Chi Ching. A reimagined series based on Water Margin, 108 Fighters, was created by Andy Seto.

Inspired by the novel, the Italian artist Magnus created the graphic novel I Briganti ("The Outlaws"), which had a great impact on the Italian mediascape.

In 2007, Asiapac Books published a graphic narrative version of portions of the novel.

=== Film ===
Most film adaptations of Water Margin were produced by Hong Kong's Shaw Brothers Studio and mostly released in the 1970s and 1980s. They include: The Water Margin (1972), directed by Chang Cheh and others; Delightful Forest (1972), directed by Chang Cheh again and starring Ti Lung as Wu Song; Pursuit (1972), directed by Kang Cheng and starring Yueh Hua as Lin Chong; All Men Are Brothers (1975), a sequel to The Water Margin (1972) directed by Chang Cheh and others; and Tiger Killer (1982), directed by Li Han-hsiang and starring Ti Lung as Wu Song again.

Other non-Shaw Brothers production include: All Men Are Brothers: Blood of the Leopard, also known as Water Margin: True Colours of Heroes (1992), which centers on the story of Lin Chong, Lu Zhishen and Gao Qiu, starring Tony Leung Ka-fai, Elvis Tsui and others; and Troublesome Night 16 (2002), a Hong Kong horror comedy film which spoofs the story of Wu Song avenging his brother.

=== Television ===
Television series directly based on Water Margin include: Nippon Television's The Water Margin (1973), which was later released in other countries outside Japan; Outlaws of the Marsh (1983), which won a Golden Eagle Award; CCTV's The Water Margin (1998), produced by Zhang Jizhong and featuring fight choreography by Yuen Woo-ping; All Men Are Brothers (2011), directed by Kuk Kwok-leung and featuring actors from mainland China, Hong Kong and Taiwan.

Animations adapted from Water Margin include: Giant Robo: The Animation (1992), an anime series based on Mitsuteru Yokoyama's manga series; Outlaw Star (1998), another cartoon series which makes several references to the novel; Hero: 108 (2010), a flash animated series produced by various companies and shown on Cartoon Network. Galaxy Divine Wind Jinraiger, an anime in the J9 Series planned for a 2016 broadcast, has also cited Water Margin as its inspiration.

The 2004 Hong Kong television series Shades of Truth, produced by TVB, features three characters from the novel who are reincarnated into present-day Hong Kong as a triad boss and two police officers respectively.

=== Stage ===
Water Margin in Chinese opera

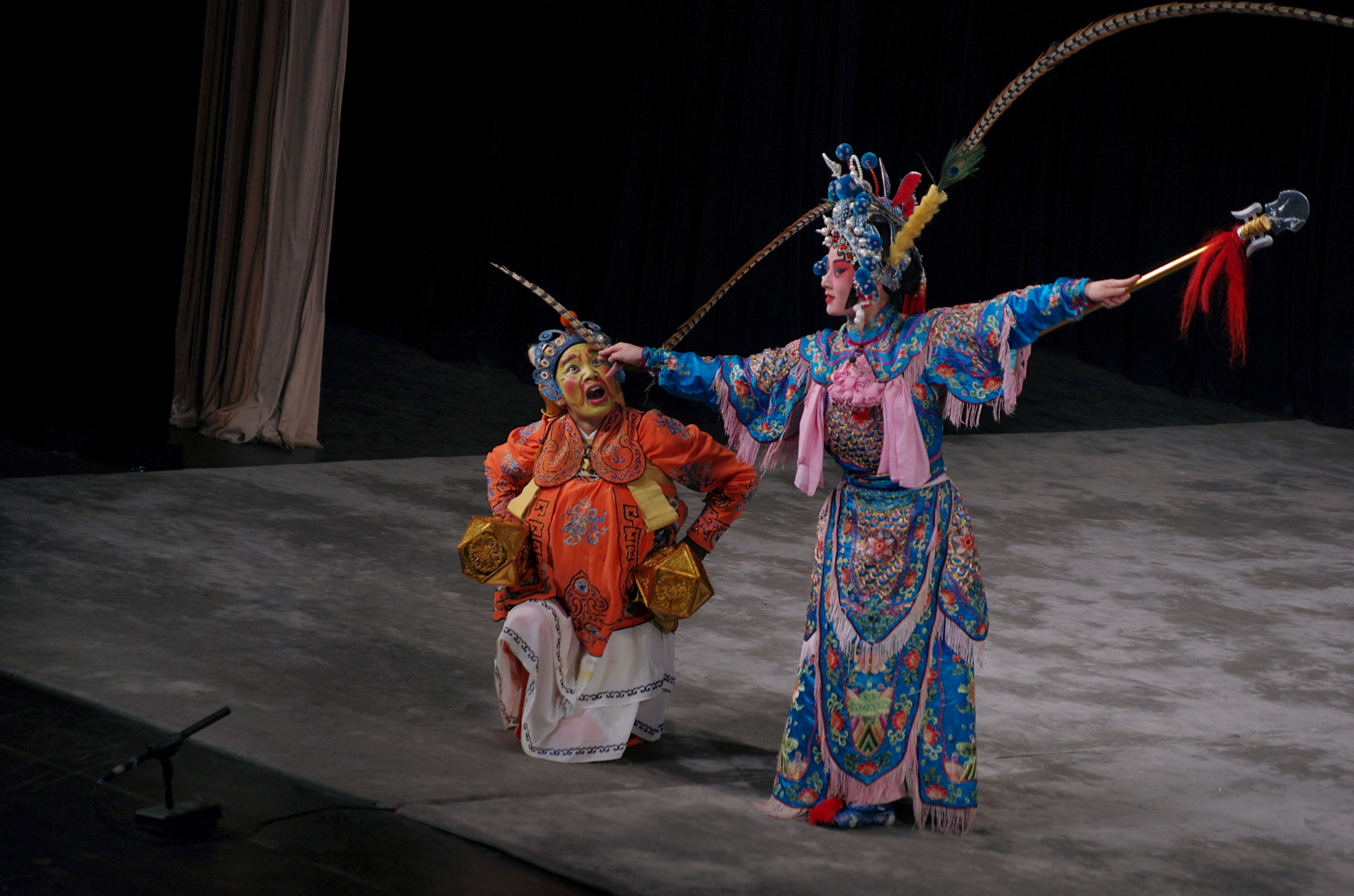
Wang Ying and Hu Sanniang in Peking opera

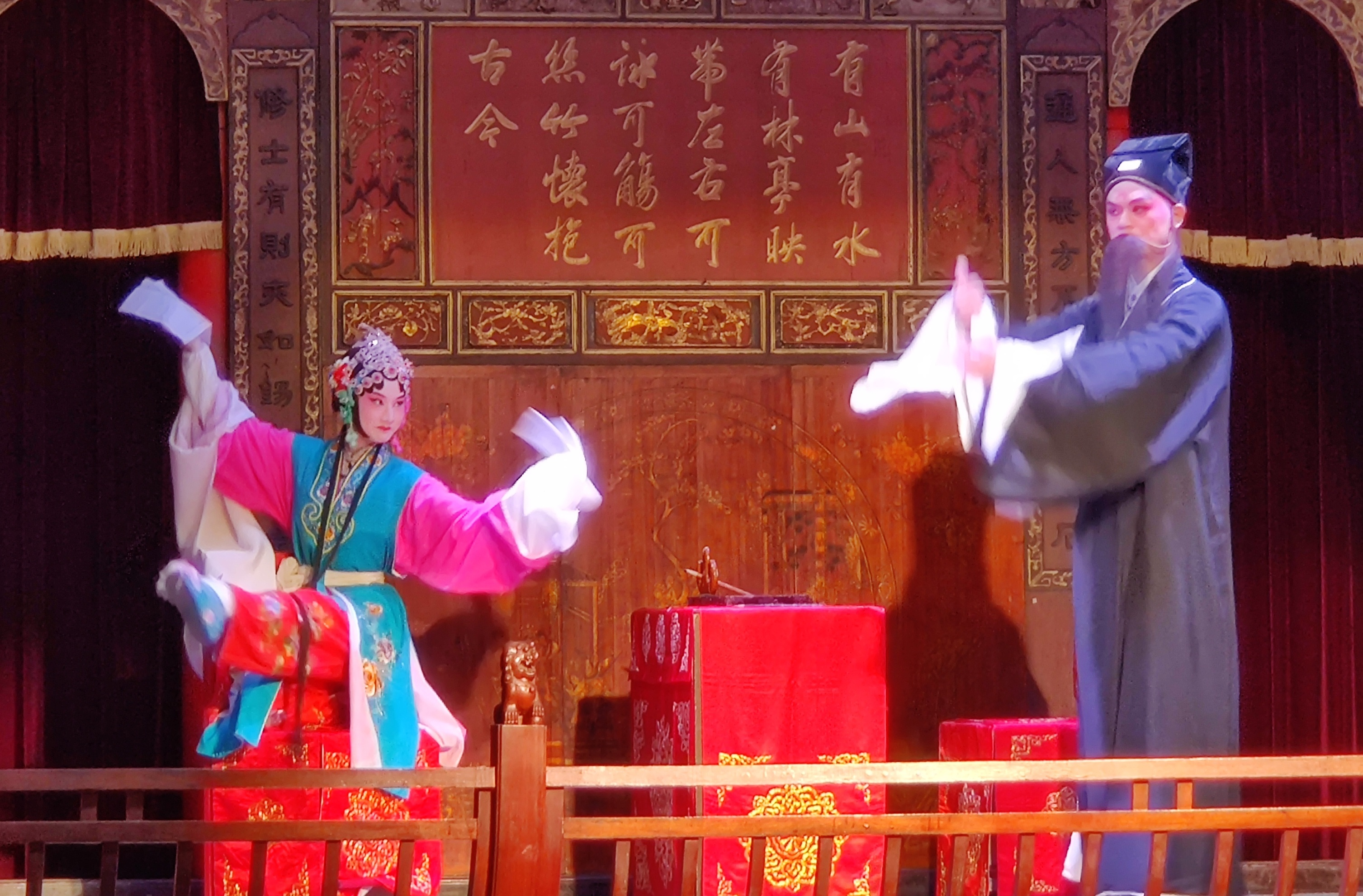
Yan Xijiao and Song Jiang in Yangzhou opera

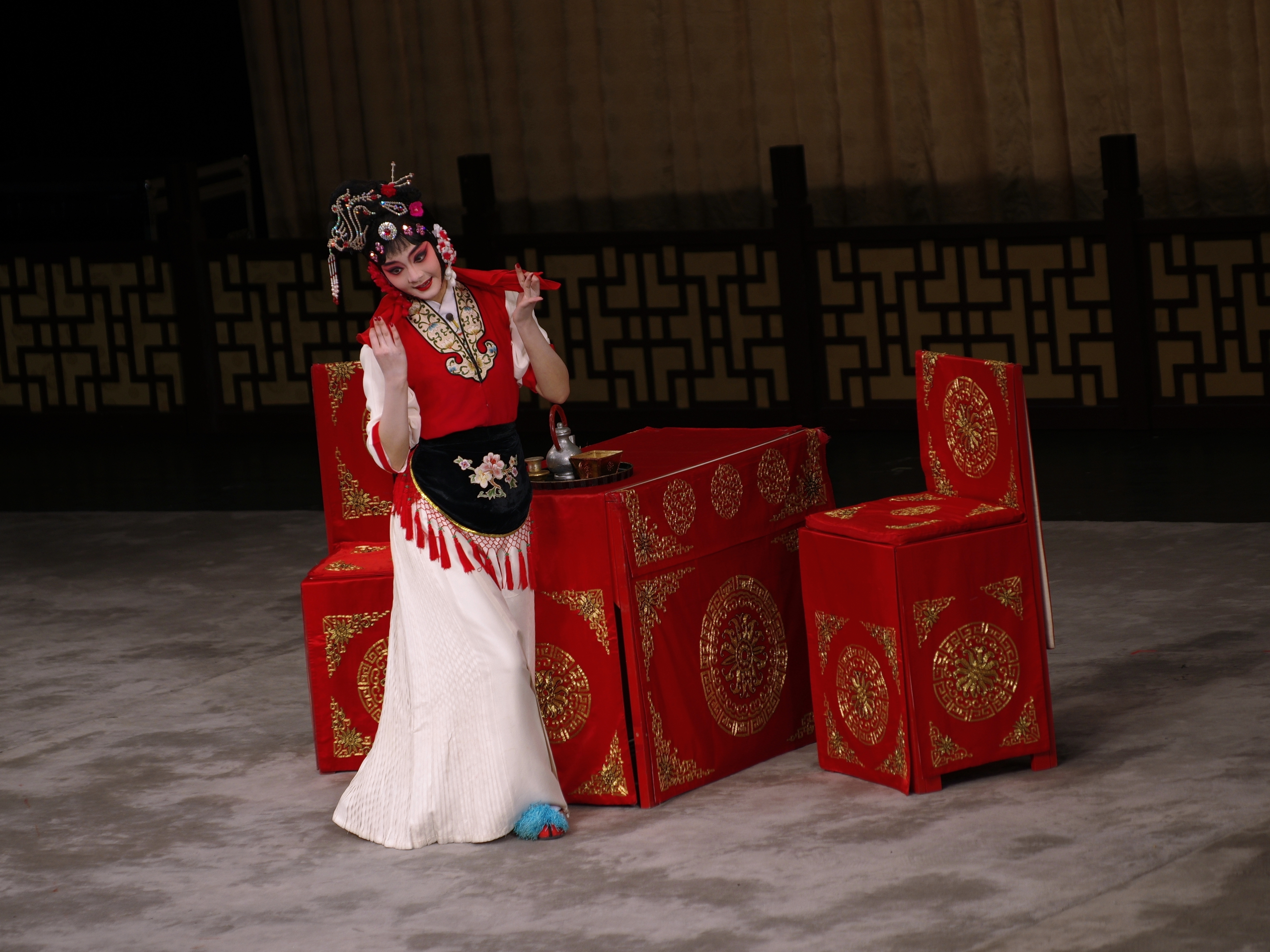
Pan Jinlian in Kunqu

Water Margin has given rise to a large number of theatrical pieces in the major forms, regional dramas, and different kinds of performing arts that elaborate on well-known episodes of the novel, usually those before the grand assembly. In the Ming and Qing dynasties, the Water Margin themes were repeatedly used in a fairly large number of zaju and chuanqi plays. Around the 1750s, the imperial court commissioned an enormous multi-volume drama entitled The Plan of the Stars of Loyalty and Righteousness (Zhongyi Xuantu), which was based on the various existing kunju-system Water Margin dramas and refashioned this "politically sensitive and morally damaging" story for Qing purposes. Peking opera has a deep relationship with traditional novels, and there are over seventy plays based on Water Margin.

Song Jiang, a 1921 civilized drama is regarded as the first huaju based on Water Margin. Later Ouyang Yuqian's five-act play Pan Jinlian (1926), which controversially recasts Pan as a "modern, liberated woman in steadfast pursuit of romantic love", received wider acclaim. In the early 1940s, two Peking opera plays with "new political content", launched by the Communists, were highly successful, both based on the novel: Three Campaigns against the Zujiazhuang Village was staged to inspire people in their resistance against Japanese aggression during the Second World War; the 1944 production Driven to Join the Liang Mountain Rebels (Bishang Liangshan) has been credited as, due to Mao Zedong's enthusiastic praise, "an epoch-making beginning of revolutionizing old theater" in the official discours.

In the "Seventeen Years" period (1949-1966), Water Margin drama became one of the most frequently created and adapted traditional dramas, and the image of Liangshan heroes was reconstructed to represent "typical revolutionary historical figures". Following the market-oriented transformation in the 1990s, various creators of Water Margin dramas worked to weaken political overtones and fit a kitsch aesthetic. "108 Heroes", a three-part opera first shown in 2007 mixing Chinese opera, street dance, cosplay, and live rock music, gained success.

=== Video games ===
Video games based on the novel include Konami's console RPG series Suikoden and Koei's strategy game Bandit Kings of Ancient China. Other games with characters based on the novel or were partly inspired by it include: Jade Empire, which features a character "Black Whirlwind" who is based on Li Kui; Data East's Outlaws Of The Lost Dynasty, which was also released under the titles Suiko Enbu and Dark Legend; Shin Megami Tensei: Imagine. There is also a beat em' up game Shuǐhǔ Fēngyún Chuán (Chinese: 水滸風雲傳; lit. 'Water and Wind'), created by Never Ending Soft Team and published by Kin Tec in 1996. It was re-released for the Mega Drive and in arcade version by Wah Lap in 1999. An English version titled "Water Margin: The Tales of Clouds and Winds" by Piko Interactive translated and released in 2015. Some enemy sprites are taken from other beat 'em ups and modified, including Knights of the Round, Golden Axe and Streets of Rage.

In the 8th canto of the 2023 video game Limbus Company, there is a faction known as "The Pinky", based on the 108 heroes.

=== Other ===
In Chinese, the name "Li Gui" – from the character who impersonates the notorious Li Kui to rob people – is used as a synonym for fake products.

The temple fair in Southern Taiwan Song Jiang Battle Array is based on the acrobatic fighting from Water Margin.

Characters from the story often appear on Money-suited playing cards, which are thought to be the ancestor of both modern playing cards and mahjong tiles. These cards are also known as Water Margin cards (水滸牌).

The trading card game Yu-Gi-Oh! has an archetype based on the 108 heroes known as the "Fire Fist" (known as "Flame Star" in the OCG) (炎えん星せい, Ensei) where the monsters aside from Horse Prince, Lion Emperor, and Spirit are based on those heroes.

== Appendix ==
=== Bibliography ===
- Chin, Shen T'an (Jin Shengtan) (7 March 1935), "Preface to 'Sui Hu'" (PDF), The China Critic, translated by T.K.C.: 234–235 reprinted at China Heritage Quarterly. Written by Jin, but attributed to Shi Nai'an.
- Dent-Young, John. "Translating Chinese Fiction: The Shui Hu Zhuan," in Sin-Wai Chan and David Pollard, An Encyclopedia of Translation: Chinese-English, English-Chinese (Hong Kong: Chinese University Press, 1995), 249–261 .
- Ge, Liangyan (2001). Out of the Margins: The Rise of Chinese Vernacular Fiction. Honolulu: University of Hawaiʻi Press. ISBN 978-0-8248-2370-2.
- Gregory, Scott W. (2023). Bandits in Print: "The Water Margin" and the Transformations of the Chinese Novel. Ithaca: Cornell University Press. ISBN 978-1-5017-6919-1. Available Free Download Open Access.
- Hsia, C.T., "The Water Margin," in C.T. Hsia, The Classic Chinese Novel: A Critical Introduction (1968; rpr. Cornell University Press, 1996), pp. 75–114.
- Jenner, William (1996). "Tough Guys, Mateship and Honour: Another Chinese Tradition" (PDF). East Asian History. 12. Melbourne: Australian National University: 1–34. ISSN 1036-6008.
- Liu, Peng (2016). ""Conceal my Body so that I can Protect the State": The Making of the Mysterious Woman in Daoism and Water Margin". Ming Studies. 2016 (74): 48–71. doi:10.1080/0147037X.2016.1228876. S2CID 164447144.
- Lu Xun (1997). A Brief History of Chinese Novels 1 (in Japanese). Vol. 4. Translated by Nakajima Chobun. 平凡社. ISBN 978-4-582-80618-2.
- Li, Wai-Yee (2001). "Full-Length Vernacular Fiction". In Mair, Victor (ed.). The Columbia History of Chinese Literature. NY: Columbia University Press., esp. pp. 626–332.
- Mann, Susan (2000). "The Male Bond in Chinese History and Culture". American Historical Review. 105 (5): 1600–1614. doi:10.2307/2652032. JSTOR 2652032.
- Plaks, Andrew H. (1987). "Shui-hu-chuan: Deflation of Heroism". The Four Masterworks of the Ming Novel: Ssu ta ch'i-shu. Princeton, NJ: Princeton University Press. pp. 279–360.
- Porter, Deborah (1993). "Toward an Aesthetic of Chinese Vernacular Fiction: Style and the Colloquial Medium of Shui-Hu Chuan". T'oung Pao. 79 (1/3): 113–153. doi:10.1163/156853293X00044. JSTOR 4528584.
- Wu, Yenna (2013), Ming-Qing Fiction, Oxford Online Bibliographies (Chinese Studies), Oxford University Press
- Lai, Ming (1964). A History of Chinese Literature. London: Shenval Press. ISBN 37045000129546.
- Yeh, Catherine Vance (2015). The Chinese Political Novel: Migration of a World Genre. Harvard East Asian Monographs. Vol. 380. Harvard University Asia Center. doi:10.2307/j.ctv47w7q9. ISBN 9780674504356.
- Hsia, C. T. (2016) [1st pub. Columbia University Press:1968]. The Classic Chinese Novel: A Critical Introduction. Chinese University of Hong Kong. ISBN 978-962-996-657-7.
- Luo, Yuming (2011). A Concise History of Chinese Literature. Translated by Ye, Yang. Brill. ISBN 9789004203662.
- Martin Huang, ed. (2004). Snakes' Legs; Sequels, Continuations, Rewritings, and Chinese Fiction. Unibetsity of Hawaii Press. ISBN 978-0-8248-2812-7.
  - Huang, Martin W. "Boundaries and Interpretations: Some Preliminary Thoughts on Xushu". In Martin Huang (2004), pp. 19–45.
  - Widmer, Ellen. "Honglou meng Sequels and Their Female Readers in Nineteenth Century China". In Martin Huang (2004), pp. 116–142.
  - Yang, Shuhui. "Growing from the Waist: The Problem of Sequeling in Yu Wanchun's Dangkou zhi". In Martin Huang (2004), pp. 143–158.
