= Outlaws of the Marsh (TV series) =

1983 Chinese TV series

- Also known as: The Water Margin
- 水浒
- Genre: Costume drama, martial arts
- Based on: Water Margin by Shi Nai'an
- Directed by: Chen Min; Liu Liu; Liu Ziyun
- Starring: Bao Guo'an; Zhu Yanping; Yu Shoujin; Dong Ziwu; Ding Rujun
- Country of origin: China
- Original language: Mandarin
- No. of episodes: 40

Production
- Production location: China
- Running time: ≈45 minutes per episode

Original release
- Network: Shandong TV

Outlaws of the Marsh (水浒) is a Chinese television series adapted from the 14th-century classical novel Water Margin by Shi Nai'an. It was first broadcast on Shandong TV in China in 1983, and was not completed until 1986. The series was one of the earliest television dramas with an ancient Chinese setting to be produced in mainland China. It was divided into different parts, each focusing on the story arc of a certain character. Widely regarded as a classic in mainland China, the series won a Golden Eagle Award.

== Cast ==
=== Liangshan heroes ===
- Peng Yintai as Chao Gai
- Bao Guo'an / Yang Yuqing as Song Jiang
- Ji Zhenhua as Wu Yong
- Zhang Xingya as Gongsun Sheng
- Ding Rujun as Lin Chong
- Li Chaoyou as Chai Jin
- Ding Xiaoqiu as Zhu Tong
- Yu Shoujin as Lu Zhishen
- Zhu Yanping as Wu Song
- Wang Haisheng as Yang Zhi
- Zhang Fumin as Liu Tang
- Dong Ziwu as Li Kui
- Zhou Bo as Shi Jin
- Zhang Dingrong as Lei Heng
- Ma Houxin as Ruan Xiaoer
- Liu Ning as Ruan Xiaowu
- Wang Bin as Ruan Xiaoqi
- Wang Xiuli as Hu Sanniang
- Liu Weicheng as Song Wan
- Hu Chaofeng as Du Qian
- Zhou Xiaosheng as Li Zhong
- Wang Junfa as Zhou Tong
- Han Yiqiang as Zhu Gui
- Sun Cuiping as Gu Dasao
- Qiu Jianhua as Sun Erniang
- Meng Xianli as Bai Sheng

=== Others ===
- Xu Xueli as Butcher Zheng
- Song Hong as Jin Cuilian
- Liang Zhao as Jin Cuilian's father
- Liu Ziyun as Innkeeper
- Chen Meicun as Granny Yu
- Yu Yan as Old woman
- Li Changqing as Prisoner
- Wang Yougang as Abbot
- Gao Ruping as Elder Zhizhen
- Li Liang as Boy
- Dai Tiansi as Squire Zhao
- Li Dexiang as Blacksmith
- Wei Wensheng as Squire Liu
- Feng Chong as Housekeeper
- Ma Yingchun as Zhang San
- Li Zhenduo as Li Si
- Mou Changling as Elder Zhiqing
- Wang Yuyao as Guest
- Yang Chunsheng as Caitou
- Xing Hong as Lin Chong's wife
- Chai Zhenduo as Instructor Zhang
- Li Xiangzhi as Jin'er
- Li Yanhua as Li Xiao'er
- Lei Zhongqian as Gao Qiu
- Huang Gang as Gao Yanei
- Wu Yongli as Lu Qian
- Sun Daming as Fu'an
- Zhao Yong as Dong Chao
- Ren Longhan as Xue Ba
- Tian Zhiming as Instructor Hong
- Wang Bing as Tavern owner
- Liu Yu as Li Xiao'er's wife
- Huang Mingduo as Prison camp official
- Yuan Chuancai as Warden
- Wang Bin as Wang Lun
- Jiao Tiyi as Liang Shijie
- Li Suyu as Liang Shijie's wife
- Gao Ruping as Supervisor Xie
- Mao Yucong as Housekeeper
- Li Zhenfeng as Fat Yuhou
- Shu Yaoxuan as Thin Yuhou
- Sun Chuanxin as He Tao
- Yu Yan as He Tao's wife
- Xin Ren as He Qing
- Wang Zhihai as Constable
- Xu Xiaoyi as Governor
- Tian Jiali as Magistrate
- Wei Huili as Yan Poxi
- Zhang Qian as Granny Wang
- Wang Lingyun as Jiang the Door God's concubine
- Kang Qunzhi as Inspector Zhang's wife
- Shang Lihua as Yulan
- Wang Yuxia as Inspector Zhang's daughter
- Bao Shaohua as Liu Gao's wife
- Xu Shaohua as Chen Xing
- Zhu Deying as Li Gui's wife
- Sun Zhimin as Li Kui's mother
- Che Xiangqing as Yue Daniangzi
- Wang Lü'e as Chai Jin's wife
- Wang Junying as Gongsun Sheng's mother
- Zhang Shuzhen as Squire Liu's wife
- Mou Xia as Pan Jinlian
- Wang Yuxia as Fairy of the Nine Heavens
- Han Yiqiang, Lu Honglin as soldiers
- Zhou Limin, Wu Hongzhang, Si Zhaode as waiters
- Yang Hongbao, Li Zhaoping, Shan Junyi, Zhang Xingyun, Wang Jiguang, Xu Yumu, Zhu Xiangxi, Yang Shenghe, Li Baoquan as monks
- Meng Xianmin, Zhou Yafei, Ma Baotong as Squire Liu's servants
- Li Yihui, Liu Peng as Zhou Tong's henchmen
- Du Jun, Zhang Yan, Zeng Xianchun, Huang Shoumin, Li Yong as rascals
- Liu Xiaoming, Gai Wenge, Li Jianmin, Wu Yongli, Li Xingguo, Xu Shaojie, Yuan Zongquan, Song Hongtao, Wang Shusen, Ye Yueji, Sun Guoxi as soldiers

== See also ==
- The Water Margin (film)
- The Water Margin (1973 TV series)
- The Water Margin (1998 TV series)
- All Men Are Brothers (TV series)
