= The Water Margin (film) =

1972 Hong Kong film by Chang Cheh, Pao Hsueh-li and Wu Ma

- Film poster
- 水滸傳
- Directed by: Chang Cheh; Pao Hsueh-li; Wu Ma
- Screenplay by: Chang Cheh; Ni Kuang
- Based on: Water Margin by Shi Nai'an
- Produced by: Run Run Shaw
- Starring: David Chiang; Tetsurō Tamba; Ku Feng; Toshio Kurosawa
- Cinematography: Kung Mu-to
- Edited by: Kwok Ting-hung
- Music by: Frankie Chan
- Production company: Shaw Brothers Studio
- Distributed by: Shaw Brothers Studio; New World Pictures; Warner Home Video; Siren Visual; Dutch FilmWorks; Future Film; Image Entertainment
- Release date: 17 March 1972
- Running time: 120 minutes
- Country: Hong Kong
- Language: Mandarin

The Water Margin (水滸傳), also known as Outlaws of the Marsh and Seven Blows of the Dragon, is a 1972 Hong Kong wuxia film adapted from the 14th-century Chinese classical novel Water Margin by Shi Nai'an. It was produced by the Shaw Brothers Studio and directed by Chang Cheh, Pao Hsueh-li and Wu Ma, starring David Chiang, Tetsurō Tamba, Ku Feng, Toshio Kurosawa, and others. The film follows the story arc in the novel about how Lu Junyi (Tamba) and Yan Qing (Chiang) come to join the outlaws at Liangshan Marsh and the outlaws' battle with Shi Wengong (Kurosawa) and the Zeng Family Fortress.

== Synopsis ==
Chao Gai, the chief of the outlaw band at Liangshan Marsh, has been killed in battle by Shi Wengong. His followers, led by interim chief Song Jiang, vow to avenge him. They seek to recruit Lu Junyi, a formidable fighter who was also trained by the same master as Shi Wengong, to join them and help them in their quest. Besides, if they manage to get Lu Junyi on board, they will also win over his steward Yan Qing, a multi-talented martial artist.

Wu Yong, accompanied by Li Kui, infiltrate the Daming Prefecture in disguise as a fortune teller and his assistant, and visit Lu Junyi's residence. Wu Yong pretends to advise Lu Junyi to leave home to avert disaster, but Yan Qing recognises Li Kui and provokes him into a fight, exposing the duo's identities. Although Wu Yong and Li Kui are detained in Lu Junyi's residence, Wu Yong manages to use reverse psychology to convince Lu Junyi to free them.

Unknown to everyone, Lu Junyi's other steward Li Gu, who has a secret affair with Lu Junyi's wife, has betrayed his master and reported the outlaws' presence to the authorities. When soldiers show up to arrest the outlaws, Lu Junyi orders Yan Qing to escort Wu Yong and Li Kui to safety, while he stays behind and gets captured. The authorities, having been bribed by Li Gu, sentence Lu Junyi to death for being in league with the outlaws.

On his way to Liangshan Marsh to seek help, Yan Qing encounters Shi Xiu and Yang Xiong. While Yang Xiong takes Yan Qing back to the outlaw stronghold, Shi Xiu goes to Daming Prefecture and storms the execution ground alone in an attempt to save Lu Junyi. However, they are overwhelmed by the soldiers and captured.

Meanwhile, Yan Qing and the outlaws work out a plan to infiltrate Daming Prefecture and save Lu Junyi and Shi Xiu just as they are about to be executed. After his rescue, Lu Junyi returns home and kills Li Gu, while Yan Qing kills Lu's disloyal wife.

Just as the outlaws are heading back to their stronghold, they run into Shi Wengong and his men, and a battle breaks out. Shi Wengong's forces are routed so he challenges the outlaws to fight him and his five apprentices in one-on-one duels. While Lu Junyi takes on Shi Wengong, Liangshan's Lin Chong, Li Kui, Hu Sanniang, Wu Song and Shi Xiu fight the five apprentices and defeat them. Shi Wengong, gravely wounded, ultimately takes his own life and declares Lu Junyi the new chief of the outlaws. The film ends with the outlaws returning to their stronghold.

== Cast ==
- David Chiang as Yan Qing
- Tetsurō Tamba as Lu Junyi
- Ku Feng as Song Jiang
- Toshio Kurosawa as Shi Wengong
- Tung Lam as Chao Gai
- Chin Feng as Wu Yong
- Elliot Ngok as Lin Chong
- Wong Chung as Shi Xiu
- Ti Lung as Wu Song
- Lily Ho as Hu Sanniang
- Fan Mei-sheng as Li Kui
- Wu Ma as Shi Qian
- Cheng Lui as Wang Ying
- Paul Chun as Hua Rong
- Chen Kuan-tai as Shi Jin
- Danny Lee as Zhang Shun
- Wu Chi-chin as Yang Xiong
- Lee Hang as Dai Zong
- Lau Dan as Lei Heng
- Lei Lung as Qin Ming
- Pang Pang as Lu Zhishen
- Zhang Yang as Chai Jin
- Leung Seung-wan as Liu Tang
- Lo Wai as Zhu Tong
- Ho Hon-chau as Zhang Heng
- Tin Ching as Li Gu
- Ling Ling as Lu Junyi's wife
- Ruby Siu Siu as Xu Hong
- Woo Wai as Cai Fu
- Yeung Chak-lam as Cai Qing
- Liu Wai as Dong Chao
- Lee Man-tai as Xue Ba
- Lee Wan-chung as Liang Shijie
- Nam Seok-hun as Wen Da
- Lau Gong as Li Cheng
- Cheng Miu as Zeng Nong
- Tong Yim-chan as Zeng Sheng
- Wang Kuang-yu as Zeng Mi
- Wong Pau-gei as Zeng Suo
- Chan Chuen as Zeng Kui
- Cheung Ban as Zeng Tu

== Release ==
The film was distributed in the United States by New World Pictures. Roger Corman cut out a third of the film, had the Shaw Brothers Studio shoot an additional sex scene and added a new narration.
