= Li Kui (Water Margin) =

Fictional character in the Chinese classical novel Water Margin

- Water Margin character
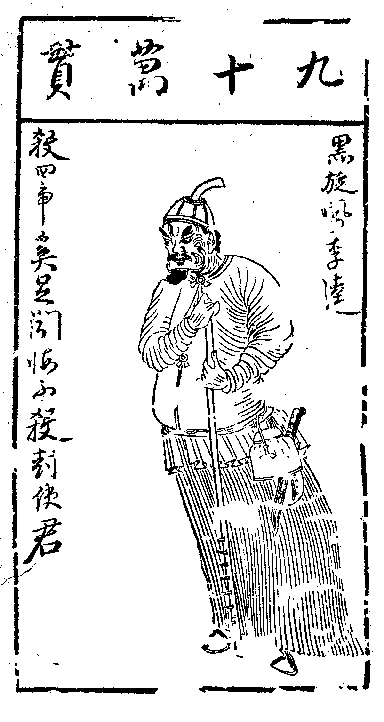
- an illustration of Li Kui by Chen Hongshou
- First appearance: Chapter 37

In-universe information
- Aliases: "Iron Ox" 鐵牛 "Mountain" 山兒
- Nicknames: "Black Whirlwind" 黑旋風
- Weapon: pair of axes, pudao
- Origin: jailer
- Designation: Infantry Commander of Liangshan
- Rank: 22nd, Killer Star (天殺星) of the 36 Heavenly Spirits
- Ancestral home / Place of origin: Baizhang Village, Yishui County (in present-day Linyi, Shandong)

Chinese names
- Simplified Chinese: 李逵
- Traditional Chinese: 李逵
- Pinyin: Lǐ Kuí
- Wade–Giles: Li K'uei

Li Kui is a fictional character in Water Margin, one of the Classic Chinese Novels. Nicknamed "Black Whirlwind", he ranks 22nd among the 36 Heavenly Spirits, the first third of the 108 Heroes.

== Fictional biography ==
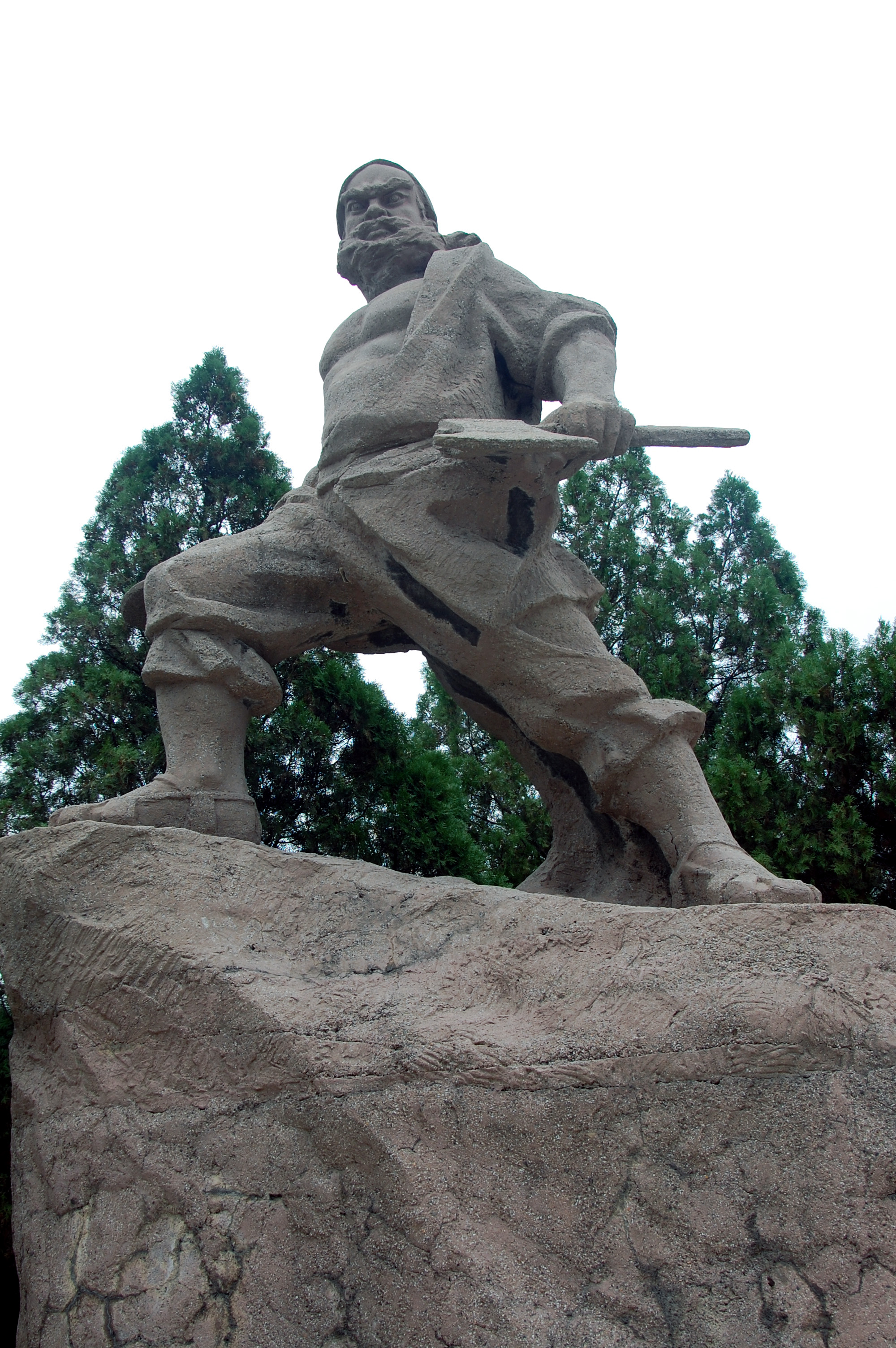
Statue of Li Kui at Mount Liang

=== Background ===
A native of Baizhang Village (百丈村) in Yishui County (in present-day Linyi, Shandong), Li Kui flees his hometown after committing manslaughter. He ends up in Jiangzhou (江州; present-day Jiujiang, Jiangxi), where he serves as a jailer under the warden Dai Zong.

=== Meeting Song Jiang ===
Li Kui gets to know Song Jiang, the eventual chief of the outlaws at Liangshan Marsh, when the latter is exiled to Jiangzhou for killing his mistress Yan Poxi in Yuncheng County. At the time, Song Jiang has just befriended Dai Zong and received the privilege of being able to freely travel around Jiangzhou while serving his sentence. Dai Zong introduces Song Jiang to Li Kui, and the two men take to each other as Song Jiang appreciates Li Kui's forthrightness while Li Kui admires Song Jiang's generosity.

=== Fight with Zhang Shun ===
While the three of them are having a meal, Song Jiang has a craving for fish. Since the fish served at the restaurant is not fresh, Li Kui volunteers to get fresh fish from the riverside market, and ends up getting into a fight with the fishmongers when he tries to snatch fish from them before it is ready for sale. The fishmongers' leader, Zhang Shun, confronts Li Kui and fights with him, but Li effortlessly beats him. Dissatisfied, Zhang Shun challenges Li Kui to fight him again, luring him onto a boat. Li Kui, who does not know how to swim, finds himself at a huge disadvantage when Zhang Shun rocks and overturns the boat, causing him to fall into the water. In the water, Zhang Shun easily beats up a now helpless Li Kui and continuously drags him underwater, nearly drowning him. Luckily, Dai Zong and Song Jiang show up and stop the fight. Li Kui and Zhang Shun make peace with each other and become close friends.

=== Becoming an outlaw ===
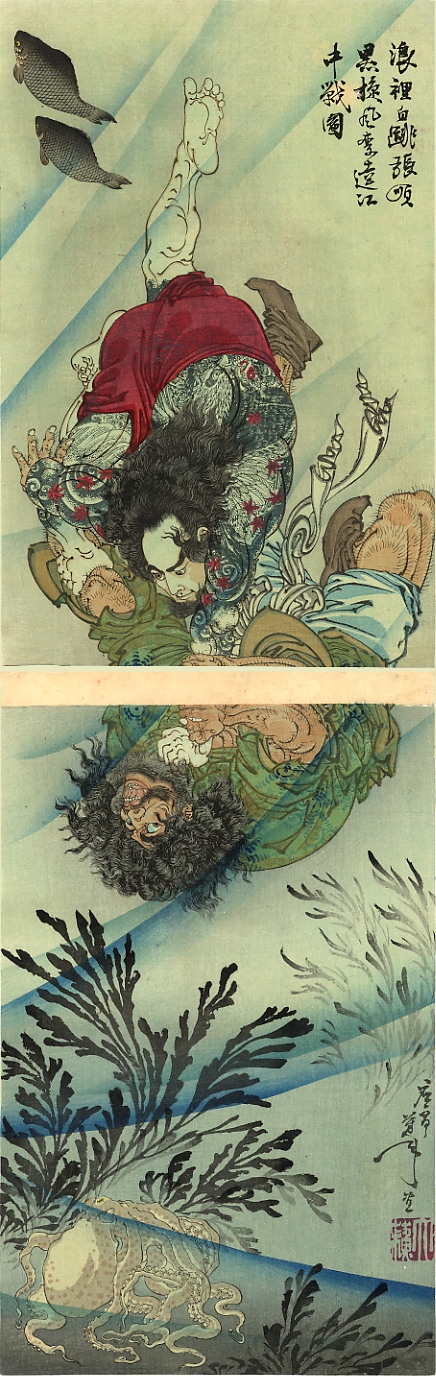
An 1887 woodblock print by Tsukioka Yoshitoshi, depicting Li Kui (bottom) wrestling with Zhang Shun underwater

Song Jiang is arrested after writing a seditious poem in a drunken stupor and thrown into prison. Dai Zong attempts to save him by secretly collaborating with the outlaws at Liangshan Marsh to trick Cai Jiu, Jiangzhou's governor, into sending Song Jiang to the capital Dongjing (東京; present-day Kaifeng, Henan) and giving the outlaws a chance to save him en route. However, the ruse fails and Dai Zong ends up being arrested and imprisoned as well. During this time, Li Kui takes good care of Song Jiang and Dai Zong, who have been severely tortured. Cai Jiu then sentences Song Jiang and Dai Zong to public execution by beheading.

Luckily for Song Jiang and Dai Zong, the Liangshan outlaws have realised the mistake in their ruse, and have shown up in full force in Jiangzhou. Together with Li Kui, the outlaws storm the execution ground and save Song Jiang and Dai Zong. Li Kui goes on a bloody rampage, hacking anyone who stands in his way – regardless of whether it is an enemy or just an innocent bystander – until the outlaws' chief Chao Gai stops him from continuing with the indiscriminate slaughter. When they are all besieged by government forces at a temple beside the river, Li Kui is the first to charge out and fight the enemy, driving them back. Just then, Zhang Shun and his friends show up in boats and ferry Li Kui, Song Jiang, Dai Zong and the outlaws safely to Liangshan Marsh. There, Li Kui and the others become part of the Liangshan outlaw band. Li Kui later helps Song Jiang take revenge by dismembering Huang Wenbing, the man who reported the seditious poem to the authorities and urged Cai Jiu to torture and execute Song Jiang.

=== Fetching his mother and slaying four tigers ===
After becoming an outlaw, Li Kui returns to his hometown to fetch his mother to join him at Liangshan. En route, he encounters Li Gui, who is impersonating him to rob unwary travellers on a remote pathway. Li Kui, after defeating the imposter, intends to kill Li Gui for smearing his name. However, Li Gui begs for his life, saying he has an elderly mother to feed. Li Kui, moved by Li Gui's filial piety, spares his life and gives his some money before letting him go. Shortly afterwards, Li Kui reaches a house, not knowing it is Li Gui's, and overhears a conversation between Li Gui and his wife about how to capture him and hand him over to the authorities for a reward. Infuriated, Li Kui dashes out and kills Li Gui, but Li Gui's wife manages to escape.

Upon reaching home, Li Kui meets his elder brother Li Da, who, afraid of being implicated, rushes off to get their neighbours to help him apprehend his outlaw brother. Li Kui flees with his mother, who has become blind, and carries her on his back while travelling off the beaten path to avoid attracting attention. In the wilderness, Li Kui's mother complains of thirst, so Li Kui leaves her while he searches for a water source. When he returns, he is shocked to realise that his mother has been killed and eaten by tigers. Overwhelmed with grief, he follows the blood trail to the tigers' den, where he slays four tigers, including two cubs. Later, he meets some hunters, who are impressed with his feat and take him to the nearby town.

Squire Cao, a wealthy gentry man in the town, pretends to praise Li Kui and treat him hospitably. In fact, Cao has met Li Gui's widow earlier and she has secretly pointed out that Li Kui is the outlaw who killed her husband. Cao tricks Li Kui, who is still grieving and has let down his guard, into consuming an alcoholic drink spiked with menghanyao (蒙汗藥), causing him to feel dizzy and become unconscious. After that, Cao sends his servant to report to the authorities, who send the constable Li Yun and his men to escort Li Kui as a captive back to the county office.

En route, Li Kui regains consciousness and realises he is a prisoner. Luckily for him, the Liangshan outlaws have sent the brothers Zhu Gui and Zhu Fu to secretly keep an eye on Li Kui in case he runs into trouble. Zhu Fu, being Li Yun's martial arts apprentice, intercepts the group and pretends to offer them refreshments to congratulate his master on capturing a wanted outlaw. Li Yun and the others unsuspectingly consume the drinks, which have been spiked with menghanyao, and get knocked out. The Zhu brothers then free Li Kui, who kills Squire Cao, Li Gui's wife, and all of Li Yun's men. When Li Kui is about to kill Li Yun as well, Zhu Fu stops him, saying that Li Yun is a righteous man. After Li Yun comes to, he grudgingly accepts his fate and joins the outlaws.

=== Conflict with Zhu Tong ===
While in Liangshan, Li Kui once accompanies Lei Heng to recruit his friend and ex-colleague Zhu Tong to join Liangshan. Zhu Tong, who has been sentenced to exile in Cangzhou after "negligently" allowing a convicted Lei Heng to escape while escorting him to a prison camp, has earned the favour of Cangzhou's governor and tasked with taking care of the governor's four-year-old son.

When Lei Heng and Liangshan's chief strategist Wu Yong secretly meet Zhu Tong to persuade him to join the outlaws, Li Kui, acting on Wu's secret instruction, abducts the governor's son and kills the boy to force Zhu's hand. Zhu Tong has no choice but to become an outlaw. He blames Li Kui for his plight, and is appeased only after Li kneels and apologises.

=== Battle of Gaotangzhou ===
Li Kui later stays in the residence of the nobleman Chai Jin, a secret ally of the Liangshan outlaws. Chai Jin travels to Gaotangzhou (高唐州; present-day Gaotang County, Shandong) to visit his uncle, with Li Kui accompanying him.

At the time, Chai Jin's uncle is being bullied by Yin Tianxi, a relative of Gaotangzhou's governor Gao Lian. When Chai Jin and Li Kui go to confront him, Yin Tianxi behaves disrespectfully towards Chai and angers Li, who charges forth and beats Yin to death. Chai Jin is arrested and imprisoned by Gao Lian, who completely disregards Chai's status, while Li Kui flees back to Liangshan to report the incident. The outlaws, under Song Jiang's leadership, gather their forces and attack Gaotangzhou to rescue Chai Jin.

However, the outlaws face a setback when Gao Lian uses black magic against them. Song Jiang then sends Dai Zong and Li Kui to Jizhou (薊州; present-day Jizhou, Tianjin) to seek help from Liangshan's sorcerer Gongsun Sheng, who has gone home to visit his mother and continue his training under his master, Taoist Luo.

After Dai Zong and Li Kui find Gongsun Sheng, they are dismayed to learn that Taoist Luo has denied Gongsun's request to leave Jizhou to help the Liangshan outlaws. Acting on impulse, Li Kui sneaks into the sanctum at night and kills Luo. He is shocked to see that Luo is alive and well the next day.

Taoist Luo punishes Li Kui for his impudence by summoning a divine guardian to pick him up and drop him off at Suzhou's administrative office, where Li is mistaken for a demon, beaten up and thrown into prison. Luo ultimately saves Li Kui and allows Gongsun Sheng to leave with Dai Zong and Li Kui on the condition that Gongsun must return to complete his training.

At Gaotangzhou, Gongsun Sheng uses his sorcery to overcome Gao Lian's black magic, allowing the outlaws to defeat the government forces to enter the city. They eventually find Chai Jin hidden at the bottom of a dry well, and Li Kui volunteers to go down to pick him up.

=== Opposing Song Jiang's quest for amnesty ===
Li Kui is appointed as a commander of the Liangshan infantry after the 108 Heroes are fully assembled. Among the Liangshan heroes, Li Kui is one of the few who, despite having deep respect for their leader Song Jiang, strongly oppose his grand plan to obtain amnesty for the outlaws from the emperor and secure opportunities for them to leave their good names in history by serving the ruling Song dynasty. In his view, the Liangshan heroes are better off being outlaws than being in servitude to the corrupt Song government.

During the Lantern Festival one year, Song Jiang disguises himself and sneaks into the capital Dongjing (東京; present-day Kaifeng, Henan) to meet Li Shishi, a courtesan whom Emperor Huizong patronises and favours. His plan is to get Li to help the outlaws convey their wish for amnesty to the emperor. However, Li Kui sabotages the meeting by starting a fire and causing chaos in the city, forcing Song Jiang to leave under the other outlaws' protection.

When Emperor Huizong finally issues an edict offering amnesty to Liangshan, the mission fails because the outlaws are outraged at the emissary's condescending attitude and the edict's harsh wording. Li Kui, in a fit of anger, hits the emissary and tears up the edict.

After this incident, Song government forces attack Liangshan but suffer crushing defeats at the hands of the outlaws. After that, the emperor offers them amnesty again, sending a more respectful emissary and a better-worded edict. This time, Li Kui grudgingly accepts amnesty along with the rest of the 108 Heroes.

=== Campaigns ===
Song Jiang's wish comes true when the emperor sends him and the former outlaws on campaigns against the Liao invaders and rebel forces in Song territory. Li Kui is one of the few survivors after the final campaign against Fang La's rebel forces, which costs the lives of nearly two-thirds of the 108 Heroes. For his contributions, he is appointed by the emperor as a military officer in Runzhou (潤州; present-day Runzhou District, Zhenjiang, Jiangsu). Missing his carefree life in Liangshan, Li Kui shows no interest in the job and spends most of his time drinking.

=== Death ===
When Song Jiang realises that he has been poisoned by the corrupt officials who are jealous of the former outlaws' achievements, he is worried that Li Kui might stir up trouble and besmear the name of Liangshan. He summons Li to his office in Chuzhou (楚州; present-day Huai'an, Jiangsu) and offers him the same poisoned drink. Upon learning what he has drunk, Li embraces his fate and requests to be buried next to Song Jiang. He dies after returning to Runzhou. Li Kui appears in Emperor Huizong's dream in the novel's last chapter, charging at the emperor with his axes in an attempt to avenge his and Song Jiang's wrongful deaths.

== In other works ==
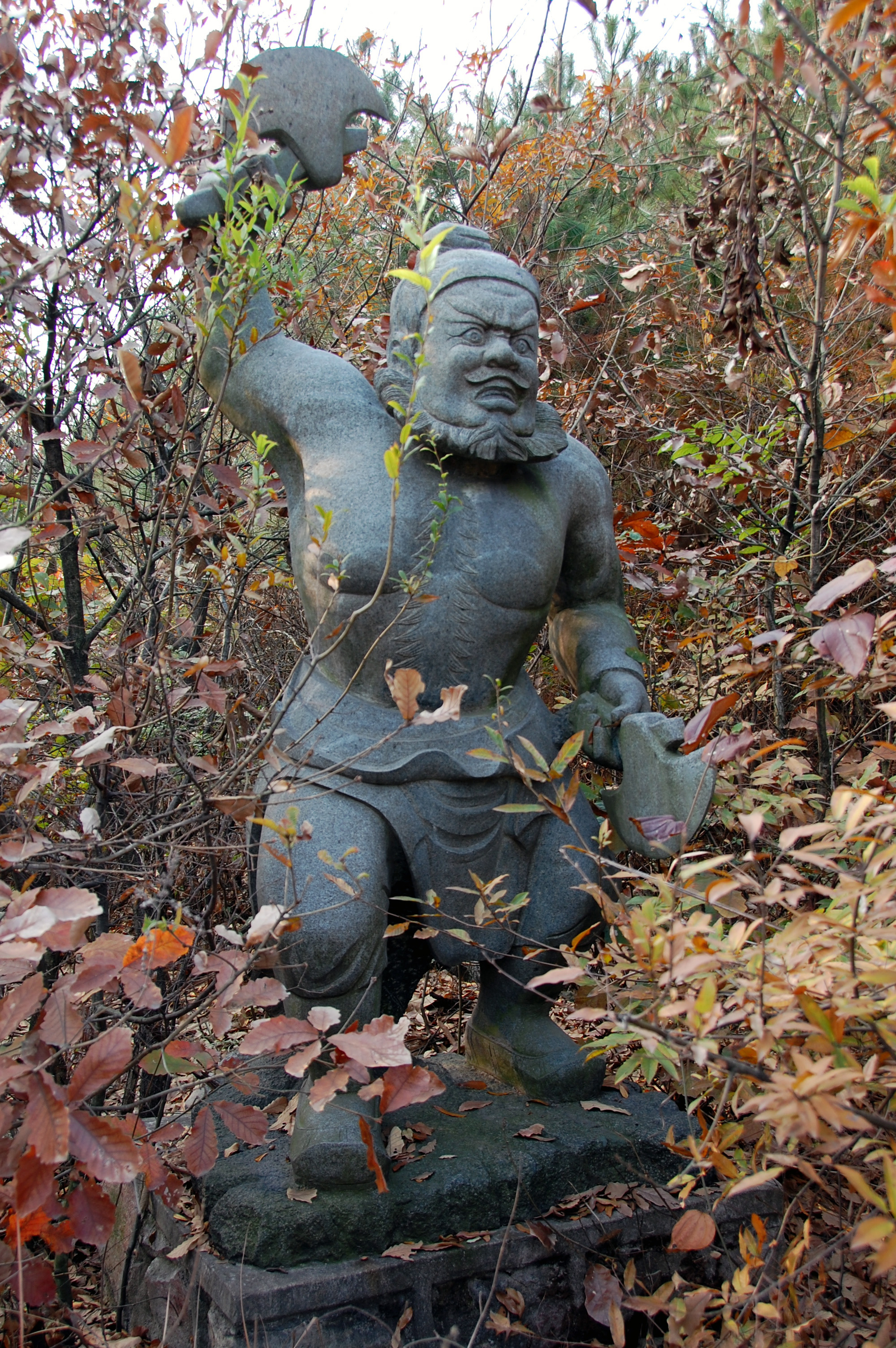
A stone statue of Li Kui at Hengdian World Studios.

Li Kui was featured in zaju plays from the Yuan dynasty which were later incorporated or adapted into the 14th-century novel Water Margin. Generally, Li Kui was portrayed in earlier zaju plays as a romantic and talented scholar before he gradually evolved into a more "simple and foolish man". This evolution laid the foundation for Li Kui's character in Water Margin.

In the 13th-century zaju play "Li Kui Offers a Humble Apology" (李逵負荊) by Kang Jinzhi, Li Kui wrongly accuses Song Jiang and Lu Zhishen of abducting a poor man's daughter due to a case of mistaken identity, and causes a huge disturbance at Liangshan when he confronts them. Later, after the truth is revealed and the victim is saved, he humbly kneels in contrition before Song Jiang and his fellow Liangshan outlaws, offering to take his own life to atone for his mistake.

Li Kui is also the central character in the 13th- or 14th-century zaju play "Black Whirlwind Makes Double Achievements" (黑旋風雙獻功) by Gao Wenxiu. In this play, Li Kui displays courage and intelligence in achieving the goals of saving a wrongfully imprisoned man and getting rid of corrupt local elites in Tai'an.

The 19th-century novel Dang Kou Zhi (蕩寇志) by Yu Wanchun provides an alternative ending to Water Margin from after the assembly of the 108 Heroes. In the latter half of the novel, the Liangshan outlaws are the villains and they are ultimately defeated by forces loyal to the Song dynasty. Li Kui is captured and taken to the capital, where he is executed by lingchi.

The 20th-century novel Can Shui Hu (殘水滸) by Cheng Shanzhi provides another alternative ending to Water Margin after the assembly of the 108 Heroes. In this version, internal conflict breaks out among the Liangshan outlaws due to betrayal, unresolved grievances, etc., resulting in their eventual demise. Li Kui is killed by Hu Sanniang in revenge as he had indiscriminately slaughtered her family members.

== Character assessment ==
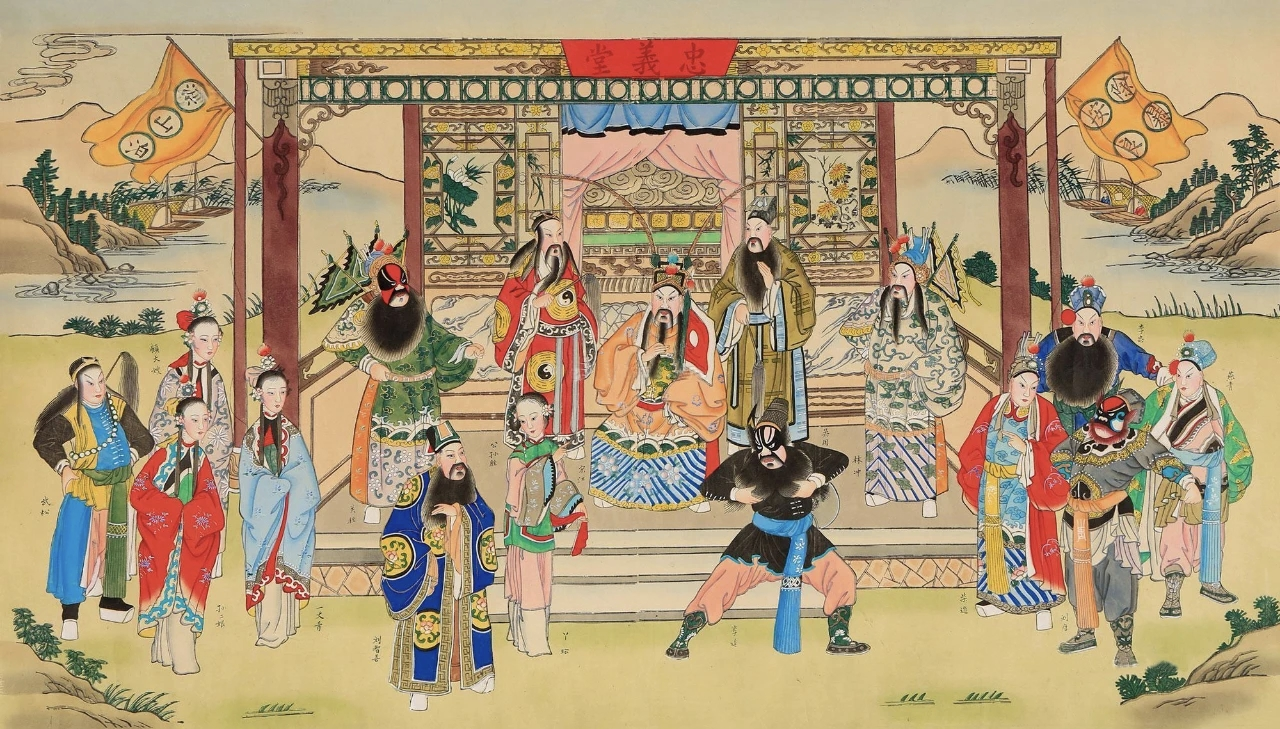
"Li Kui storms the Hall of Loyalty", a Qing dynasty Yangliuqing woodblock print depicting Li Kui attacking Song Jiang by the mistake. From left to right: Wu Song, Gu Dasao, Sun Erniang, Hu Sanniang, Guan Sheng, the emissary, a maid, Gongsun Sheng, Song Jiang, Wu Yong, Li Kui, Lin Chong, Chai Jin, Zhu Tong, Liu Tang and Yan Qing.

The novel describes Li Kui as having a very dark complexion, a reddish-yellow unibrow and fiery eyes. He is as strong as an ox, which is why he is called "Iron Ox". However, he is better known as "Black Whirlwind" for his dark complexion and berserk behaviour. Wielding a pair of axes in combat, he is notorious for his bad temper, drinking habits, and addiction to gambling. He strikes fear in people with just an intense glare. Li Kui is also known for rushing into battle without any clothes on.

Li Kui is notorious for his savagery. Although some of the other 108 Heroes are mentioned in Water Margin to have engaged in cannibalism, Li Kui is one of the more prominent examples. The 20th-century writer Lu Xun, in particular, felt disturbed by the extent of Li Kui's brutality in the novel.

Li Kui, despite being known mainly for his simple-mindedness, remains a popular subject of academic studies of Water Margin characters for his personality. He is considered representative of the peasant's everyday struggles, highlighting class conflict in feudal Chinese society. While some might see Li Kui as a person with incomplete mental faculties which account for his distorted mindset, others see him as a subversive anti-hero in the novel's story arc on the outlaws' quest for amnesty. His alleged "madness" masks deep wisdom and resistance, making him a "wise fool" who appears foolish but is profoundly insightful — a trope in literature where apparent stupidity hides truth-telling. Others analyse Li Kui in more religious aspects, by quoting from the words of Taoist Luo and a famous line from the Tao Te Ching: "Heaven and Earth are impartial; treat all beings as disposable "straw dogs" (used in rituals)". This portrays Li Kui's spiritual character as symbolising the chaotic force of nature, blending divine indifference with animalistic instincts.

== Modern references ==
In the video game Jade Empire by Bioware, a character who resembles Li Kui and also goes by the nickname "The Black Whirlwind" joins the player's party as it gets underway. He displays many of the same traits as the Water Margin character and also wields a pair of axes.

The OVA adaptation of Mitsuteru Yokoyama's Giant Robo could not obtain the licence for the original cast of the manga or the live-action series, so the creators used characters from Yokoyama's body of work, including adaptations of Water Margin. The character of Tetsugyu (which roughly translates as "Iron Ox"), known too as the Black Whirlwind, is based on Yokoyama's adaptation of Li Kui.

== See also ==
- List of Water Margin minor characters#Li Kui's story for a list of supporting minor characters from Li Kui's story.
