= Shui Hu Zhuan (disambiguation) =

Water Margin, or Shui Hu Zhuan (simplified Chinese: 水浒传; traditional Chinese: 水滸傳), is a classic Chinese novel by Shi Nai'an. Alternative titles include Outlaws of the Marsh, All Men Are Brothers, Men of the Marshes, and The Marshes of Mount Liang.

Shui Hu Zhuan or any title with the Chinese characters 水滸 or 水浒 may also refer to:

- The Water Margin (film), a 1972 Hong Kong film
- The Water Margin (1973 TV series), a 1973 Japanese TV series, shown in English from 1976 to 1978
- All Men Are Brothers (film), a 1975 Hong Kong wuxia film
- Outlaws of the Marsh (TV series), a 1983-1986 Chinese TV series
- The Water Margin (1998 TV series), a 1998 Chinese TV series
- Shades of Truth, a 2004 / 2005 Hong Kong TV series
- All Men Are Brothers (TV series), a 2011 Chinese TV series
- Suikoden, a Japanese RPG series
