= Ruan Xiao'er =

Fictional character in the Chinese classical novel Water Margin

- Water Margin character
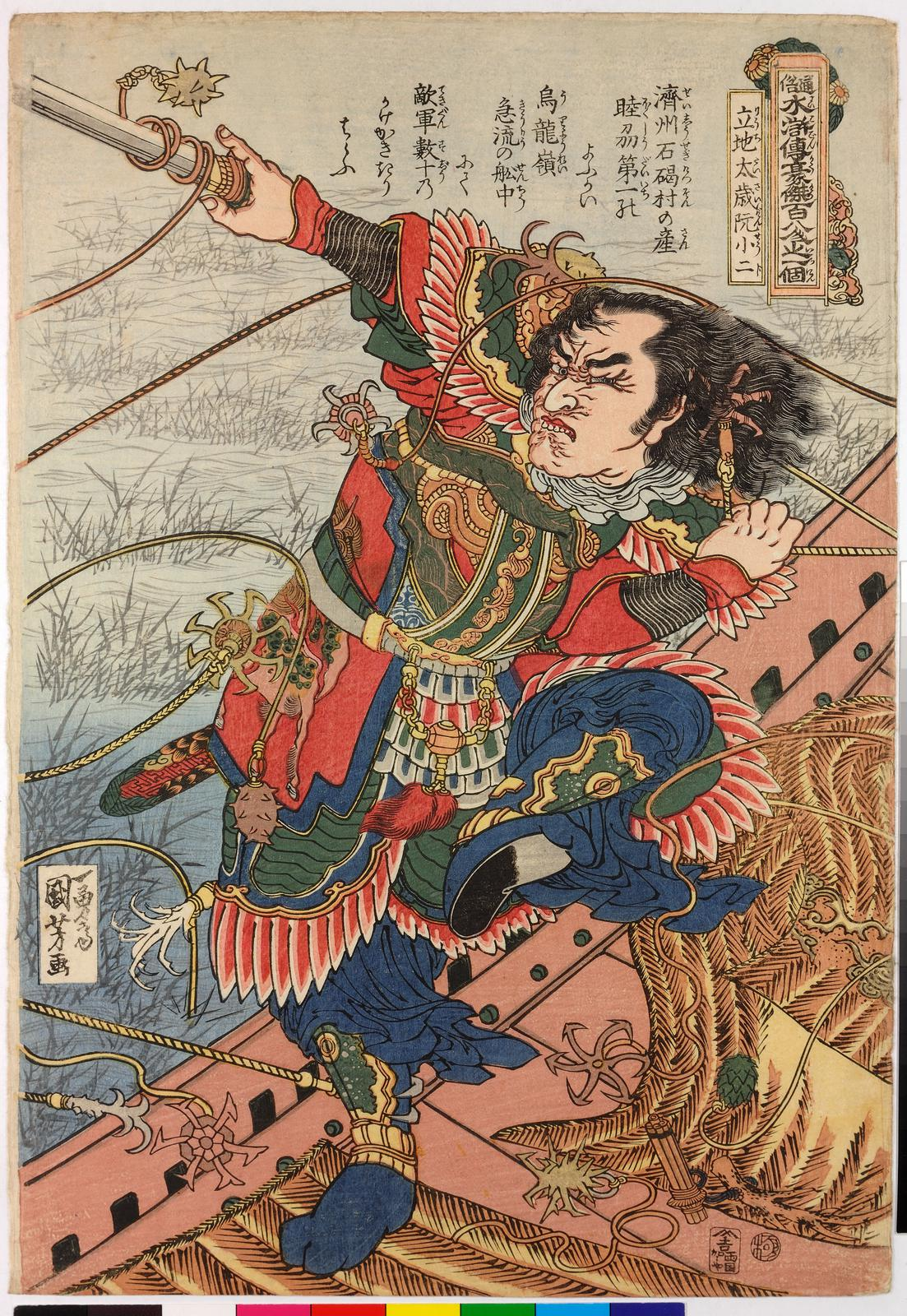
- an illustration of Ruan Xiao'er by Utagawa Kuniyoshi
- First appearance: Chapter 15

In-universe information
- Nicknames: "Tai Sui Who Stands His Ground" 立地太歲
- Origin: fisherman
- Designation: Naval Commander of Liangshan
- Rank: 27th, Sword Star (天劍星) of the 36 Heavenly Spirits
- Ancestral home / Place of origin: Shijie Village (in present-day Liangshan County, Shandong)

Chinese names
- Simplified Chinese: 阮小二
- Traditional Chinese: 阮小二
- Pinyin: Ruǎn Xiǎo'èr
- Wade–Giles: Juan Hsiao-erh

Ruan Xiao'er, also known as Ruan the Second, is a fictional character in Water Margin, one of the Classic Chinese Novels. Nicknamed "Tai Sui Who Stands His Ground", he ranks 27th among the 36 Heavenly Spirits, the first third of the 108 Heroes.

== Background ==
The novel describes Ruan Xiao'er as a muscular man with a chiselled face, a wide mouth, a cold gleam in his eyes, and some yellow hair on his chest. He has two younger brothers – Ruan Xiaowu and Ruan Xiaoqi – whom he lives with in Shijie Village (石碣村; in present-day Liangshan County, Shandong), where they make a living by fishing in the waters around Liangshan Marsh. All three brothers are exceptional swimmers and skilled fighters both on land and in water.

== Robbing the convoy of birthday gifts ==
The Ruan brothers are first introduced in the novel when Wu Yong recommends them to Chao Gai, the headman of Dongxi Village in Yuncheng County, as potential partners in their plan to rob a convoy of valuable birthday gifts for the corrupt official Cai Jing. Wu Yong then travels to Shijie Village to meet the brothers, pretending to buy fish from them while sussing out their receptivity to the idea.

Ruan Xiao'er, the most astute, senses that Wu Yong is up to something, while his brothers are more straightforward and soon reveal their discontent with living in poverty and under a corrupt government. When Wu Yong eventually reveals the true purpose of his visit, the Ruan brothers readily accept the invitation to join the heist. They form a team of seven – Chao Gai, Wu Yong, Gongsun Sheng, Liu Tang, and the three Ruan brothers – and plan to strike at Yellow Mud Ridge (黃泥崗) on the outskirts of Yuncheng County.

The seven men collaborate with their accomplice Bai Sheng to trick the soldiers escorting the convoy into consuming alcoholic drinks spiked with menghanyao (蒙汗藥), which causes dizziness and unconsciousness. Once the soldiers are out cold, the seven men make off with the valuables.

== Becoming an outlaw ==
The authorities investigate and soon identify Chao Gai as one of the robbers, despatching soldiers to Dongxi Village to arrest him and his companions. The seven men flee to Shijie Village and hide in the marshes. There, the Ruan brothers, taking advantage of their familiarity with the waterways, lure the unwary soldiers into ambushes and wipe them out. After that, the seven men seek refuge in the outlaw stronghold at Liangshan Marsh. Chao Gai eventually becomes the outlaw band's chief, with Ruan Xiao'er taking the sixth position of leadership.

== Life at Liangshan ==
During his time in Liangshan, Ruan Xiao'er puts his skills to good use in the battles between the outlaws and government forces.

On one occasion, when the artillery officer Ling Zhen bombards Liangshan with cannon fire, the Ruan brothers swim towards the riverside artillery platform undetected, and sabotage the cannons. An infuriated Ling Zhen pursues them into the marshes, where he is ambushed and captured, and ultimately decides to surrender and join the outlaws.

== Campaigns and death ==
Ruan Xiao'er is appointed as a commander of the Liangshan navy after the 108 Heroes are fully assembled. He participates in campaigns against the Liao invaders and rebel forces in Song territory after the outlaws receive amnesty from Emperor Huizong.

During the final campaign against Fang La's rebel forces, Ruan Xiao'er is assigned to attack the enemy's naval base near Black Dragon Ridge (烏龍嶺; northeast of present-day Meicheng Town, Jiande, Zhejiang). He comes under heavy shelling by enemy artillery and finds himself trapped in a sea of fire. While diving into the water to escape, he is caught in hooks by enemy marines, and ultimately commits suicide by slitting his throat to avoid being captured alive.
