= Wu Yong =

Fictional character in the Chinese classical novel Water Margin

- Water Margin character
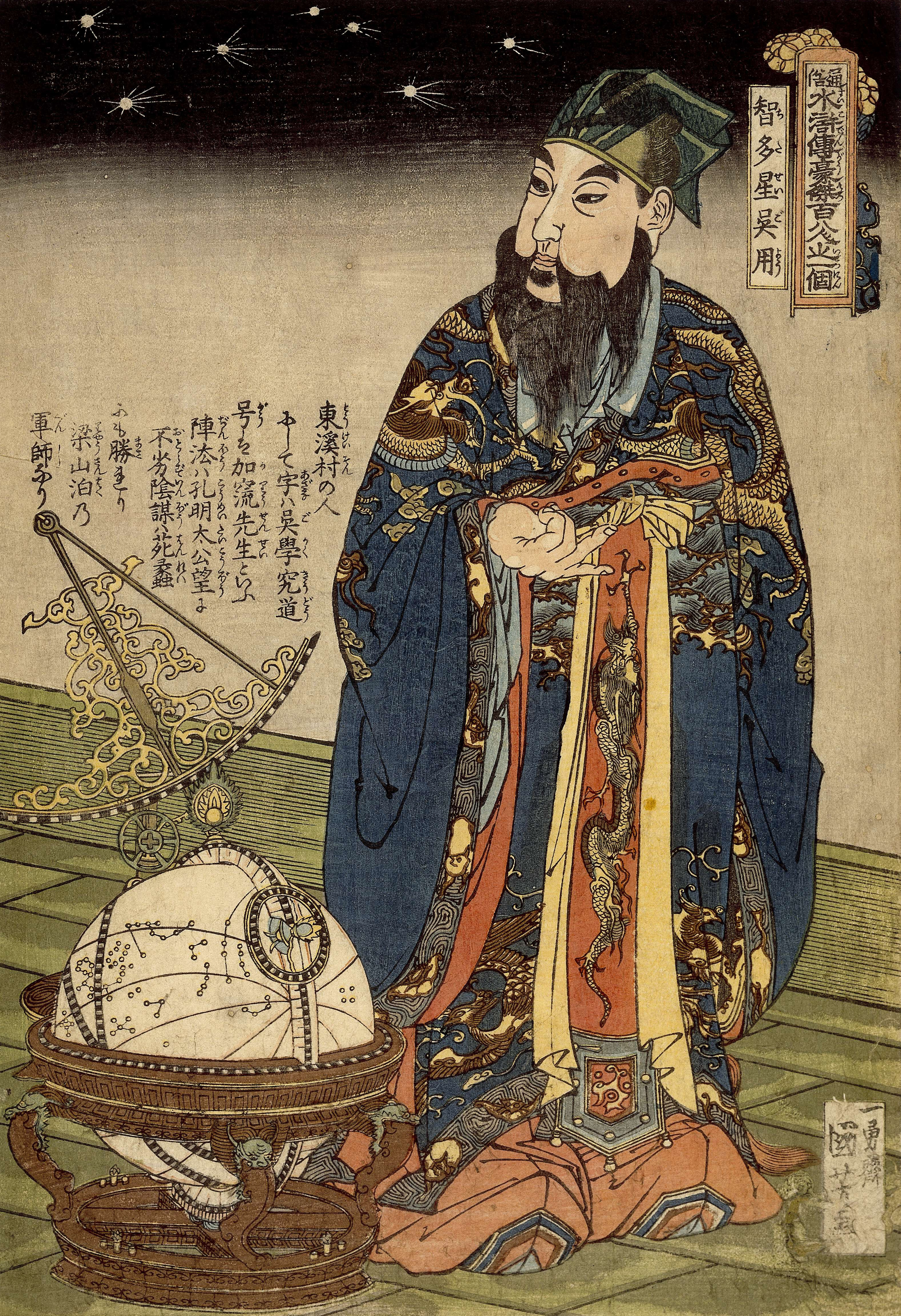
- an illustration of Wu Yong by Utagawa Kuniyoshi
- First appearance: Chapter 14

In-universe information
- Aliases: Xuejiu 學究
- Nicknames: "Knowledgeable Star" 智多星
- Weapon: a pair of bronze chains
- Origin: teacher
- Designation: Chief Strategist of Liangshan
- Rank: 3rd, Knowledge Star (天機星) of the 36 Heavenly Spirits
- Ancestral home / Place of origin: Yuncheng County, Shandong

Chinese names
- Simplified Chinese: 吴用
- Traditional Chinese: 吳用
- Pinyin: Wú Yòng
- Wade–Giles: Wu Yung

Wu Yong is a fictional character in Water Margin, one of the Classic Chinese Novels. Nicknamed "Knowledgeable Star", he ranks third among the 36 Heavenly Spirits, the first third of the 108 Heroes.

== Background ==
The novel describes Wu Yong as having a fair and handsome face and a long beard – typical features of wise, scholarly men in Chinese literature. When Wu Yong is still a teacher in Yuncheng County, he is already likened to historical figures such as Zhuge Liang and Chen Ping for his astuteness and perspicacity. He is hence nicknamed "Knowledgeable Star".

== Robbing the convoy of birthday gifts ==
Wu Yong makes his first appearance when he shows up and uses his weapons – a pair of bronze chains – to break up a fight between the local chief constable Lei Heng and the vagabond Liu Tang which started due to a misunderstanding. It turns out that Liu Tang has come to propose an idea to Chao Gai, the headman of Dongxi Village in Yuncheng County, to rob a convoy of valuable birthday gifts for the corrupt official Cai Jing. As Wu Yong is close to Chao Gai, he is invited to take part in the discussion. Wu Yong suggests roping in the Ruan brothers – Ruan Xiaoer, Ruan Xiaowu and Ruan Xiaoqi – whom they are also close to, and travels to the nearby fishing village to find them, successfully convincing the brothers to participate in the heist. At the last moment, the Taoist priest Gongsun Sheng joins the team, which now has seven people.

Wu Yong plans the heist, which will take place at Yellow Mud Ridge (黃泥岡), which is located southeast of Yuncheng County. The seven men disguise themselves as jujube traders and find the convoy, which is led by Yang Zhi, resting under the trees on a hot day. Their accomplice, Bai Sheng, pretends to pass by, selling two buckets of an alcoholic drink – one of which is secretly spiked with menghanyao (蒙汗藥), a drug that will temporarily cause the consumer to feel dizzy and lose consciousness. At first, Yang Zhi feels suspicious and refuses to allow his men to buy the drink to quench their thirst. However, they soon lower their guard after seeing that the jujube traders are fine after drinking from one bucket, so they buy the second bucket and drink from it. Once Yang Zhi and his men are out cold, the seven robbers steal the valuables and make off with them.

== Becoming an outlaw ==
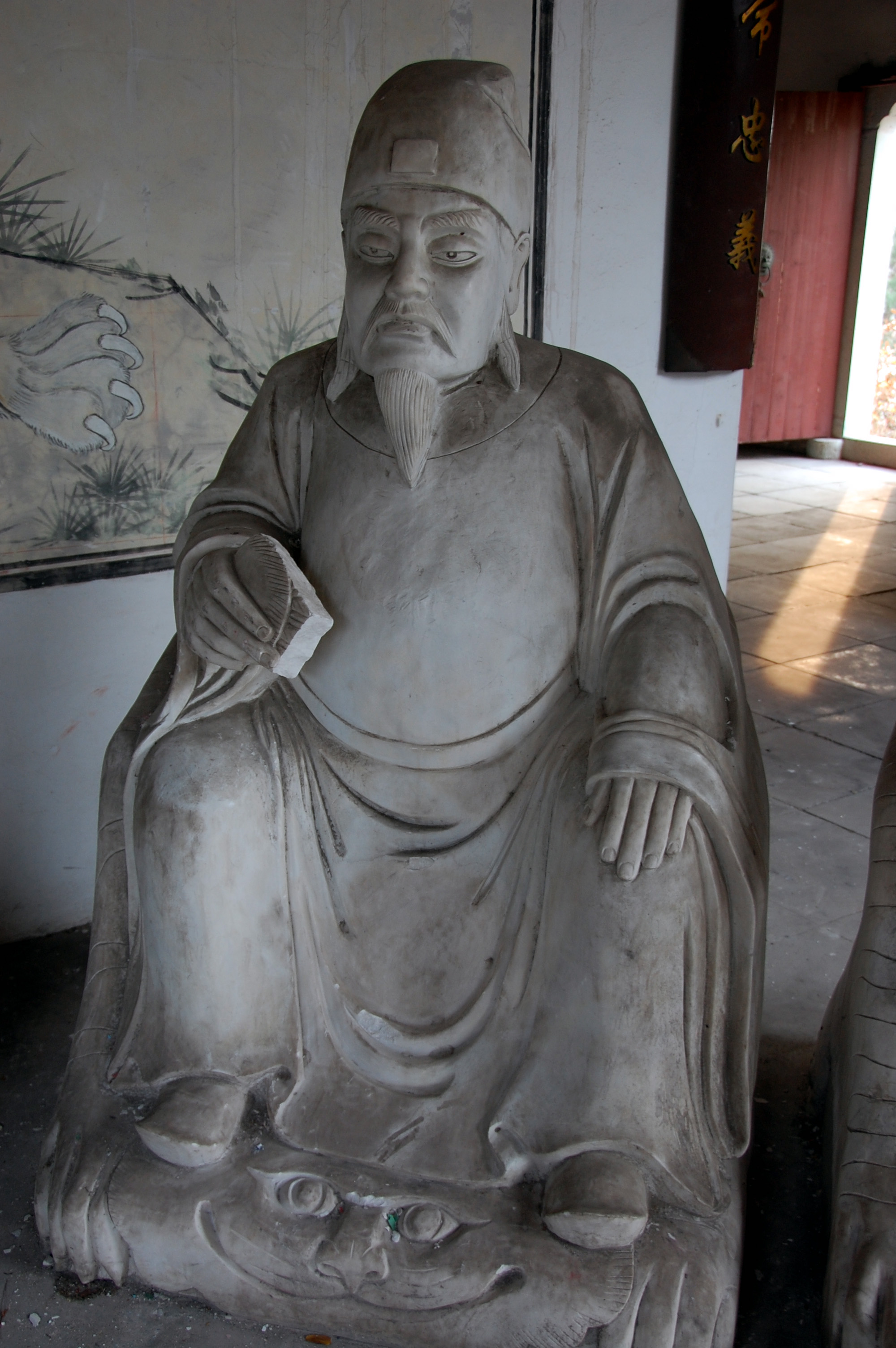
A stone statue of Wu Yong at Hengdian World Studios.

Liang Shijie, the prefect of Daming Prefecture and Cai Jing's son-in-law, is furious when he hears about the heist as he was the one who prepared the birthday gifts. He orders the local authorities of Jizhou, whose jurisdiction Yuncheng County is under, to investigate and arrest the robbers. Soon, the authorities identify Chao Gai as one of the robbers and dispatch soldiers to capture him. However, as Chao Gai is close friends with the local chief constables Zhu Tong and Lei Heng and the magistrate's clerk Song Jiang, they secretly warn him in advance and help him escape. Wu Yong, along with Chao Gai and the five others, defeat the pursuing soldiers near the Ruan brothers' fishing village before taking refuge at the outlaw stronghold at Liangshan Marsh.

Wang Lun, the outlaw band's chief, is unwilling to accept the seven men out of fear that they will usurp his leadership position. Wu Yong senses that Lin Chong, who has joined Liangshan earlier and holds a grudge against Wang Lun for initially turning him away, is seething upon seeing how Wang is treating the seven men the same way he treated Lin. Wu Yong then instigates Lin Chong into killing Wang Lun, after which Chao Gai is chosen to be the outlaw band's new chief. Under Wu Yong's direction, the outlaws defeat the forces sent by the Jizhou government to Liangshan Marsh to wipe them out.

Throughout his time in Liangshan, Wu Yong serves as the outlaw band's chief strategist, using his astute mind to guide Liangshan forces to victory in battles against their enemies. He also uses his wit and cunning on numerous occasions to trick, coerce or convince other well-known heroes to join Liangshan, including Lu Junyi, Xu Ning and Zhu Tong.

== Death ==
Wu Yong and Gongsun Sheng are appointed as Liangshan's chief strategists after the 108 Heroes are fully assembled. Although Wu Yong supports Song Jiang in becoming Liangshan's chief after Chao Gai's death, he is sceptical about Song Jiang's grand plan of eventually securing amnesty for the outlaws from the emperor, and getting the outlaws to serve the emperor in battle. Nevertheless, he still casts his lot with Song Jiang and helps him convince the others to align themselves with the same goal.

Song Jiang's dream ultimately comes true when Emperor Huizong grants the Liangshan outlaws amnesty, and sends them on campaigns against invaders from the Liao dynasty and rebel forces in Song territory.

Wu Yong participates in the campaigns as Liangshan's chief strategist, and is among the few 108 Heroes who survive the campaigns. To honour Wu Yong for his contributions, the emperor confers on him a prefecture-level dual civil–military appointment.

One night, Wu Yong dreams of Song Jiang and Li Kui, who tell him that they have died after being poisoned by the corrupt officials who are jealous of the former outlaws' achievements. Wu Yong then travels to Song Jiang and Li Kui's graves in Chuzhou (楚州; present-day Huai'an, Jiangsu), where he meets Hua Rong, who had a similar dream. Overcome with grief, they commit suicide by hanging themselves from a tree beside the graves.
