= Zhu Tong =

Fictional character in the Chinese classical novel Water Margin

- Water Margin character
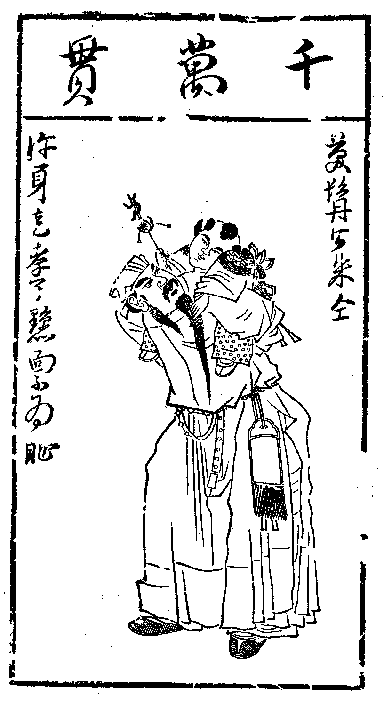
- an illustration of Zhu Tong by Chen Hongshou
- First appearance: Chapter 13

In-universe information
- Nicknames: "Lord of the Beautiful Beard" 美鬚公
- Weapon: Sabre
- Origin: constable
- Designation: Tiger Cub Vanguard Commander of Liangshan
- Rank: 12th, Fulfilment Star (天滿星) of the 36 Heavenly Spirits
- Ancestral home / Place of origin: Yuncheng County

Chinese names
- Simplified Chinese: 朱仝
- Traditional Chinese: 朱仝
- Pinyin: Zhū Tóng
- Wade–Giles: Chu T'ung

Zhu Tong is a fictional character in Water Margin, one of the Classic Chinese Novels. Nicknamed "Lord of the Beautiful Beard", he ranks 12th among the 36 Heavenly Spirits, the first third of the 108 Heroes.

== Background ==
First introduced as a chief constable in Yuncheng County, Shandong, Zhu Tong is described as a man eight chi and five cun tall, with sparkling eyes, and sporting a beard one chi and five cun long. His flowing beard makes him resemble Guan Yu, hence he is nicknamed "Lord of the Beautiful Beard".

Zhu Tong and fellow chief constable Lei Heng are close friends of Chao Gai, the headman of Dongxi village in Yuncheng County. When the county magistrate receives orders from his superiors to arrest Chao Gai and six others for robbing a convoy of birthday gifts for the corrupt official Cai Jing, he sends Zhu Tong and Lei Heng to lead their men to Dongxi Village.

Due to their close friendship with Chao Gai, both men decide to help him and his friends escape. While Lei Heng leads his men into Chao Gai's residence from the front gate, Zhu Tong stands guard at the rear gate, knowing that Chao Gai and his friends will flee from there, and secretly allows them to escape.

Chao Gai later becomes the chief of the outlaw band at Liangshan Marsh, after which he sends gifts to convey his gratitude to Zhu Tong and the magistrate's clerk Song Jiang, who have helped him escape earlier.

During this time, Song Jiang's mistress, Yan Poxi, discovers Song's connections to the outlaws and threatens to report him to the authorities if he does not agree to her demands. After Song Jiang kills her in a fit of anger, the magistrate sends Zhu Tong and Lei Heng to the Song residence to arrest him. However, Zhu Tong, being close to Song Jiang, secretly helps him escape and lies that Song has already left Yuncheng County.

== Becoming an outlaw ==
When Lei Heng runs afoul of the law after killing Bai Xiuying, he gets sentenced to exile in Jizhou (薊州; present-day Jizhou, Tianjin) and Zhu Tong is ordered to escort him there. Considering their close relationship as friends and former colleagues, Zhu Tong secretly frees Lei Heng along the way. He then returns to Yuncheng County to take responsibility for his "negligence", and gets sentenced to exile in Cangzhou as punishment.

In Cangzhou, the local prefect is so impressed with Zhu Tong that he lets Zhu serve as an assistant in his office. During this time, the prefect's four-year-old son finds Zhu Tong endearing and often wants to play with him, so Zhu becomes the boy's unofficial guardian.

One night, when Zhu Tong is outdoors with the boy, Lei Heng and Wu Yong approach him and invite him to join the outlaw band at Liangshan Marsh. When Zhu Tong declines, the Liangshan outlaw Li Kui kidnaps the boy and murders him. Left with no choice, Zhu Tong reluctantly accepts his fate and joins the outlaws, although he holds a deep grudge against Li Kui. He is appeased only after Li Kui kneels and apologises.

== Campaigns and later life ==
Zhu Tong is appointed as one of the eight Tiger Cub Vanguard Commanders of the Liangshan cavalry after the 108 Heroes are fully assembled. He participates in the campaigns against the Liao invaders and rebel forces in Song territory after the outlaws receive amnesty from Emperor Huizong.

Zhu Tong is one of the few who survive the final campaign, which costs the lives of about two-thirds of the 108 Heroes. To honour Zhu Tong for his contributions, the emperor appoints him as a general stationed in Baoding Prefecture. Zhu Tong later joins the general Liu Guangshi in fighting Jin forces during the Jin–Song wars and gets further promoted to the position of a military governor.
