= Song Jiang =

Chinese rebel

- Chinese: 宋江
Transcriptions
Standard Mandarin
- Hanyu Pinyin: Sòng Jiāng
- Wade–Giles: Sung^{4} Chiang^{1}
- IPA: [sʊ̂ŋ tɕjáŋ]
Yue: Cantonese
- Yale Romanization: Sung Gōng
- Jyutping: Sung3 Gong1
- IPA: [sʊŋ˧ kɔŋ˥]

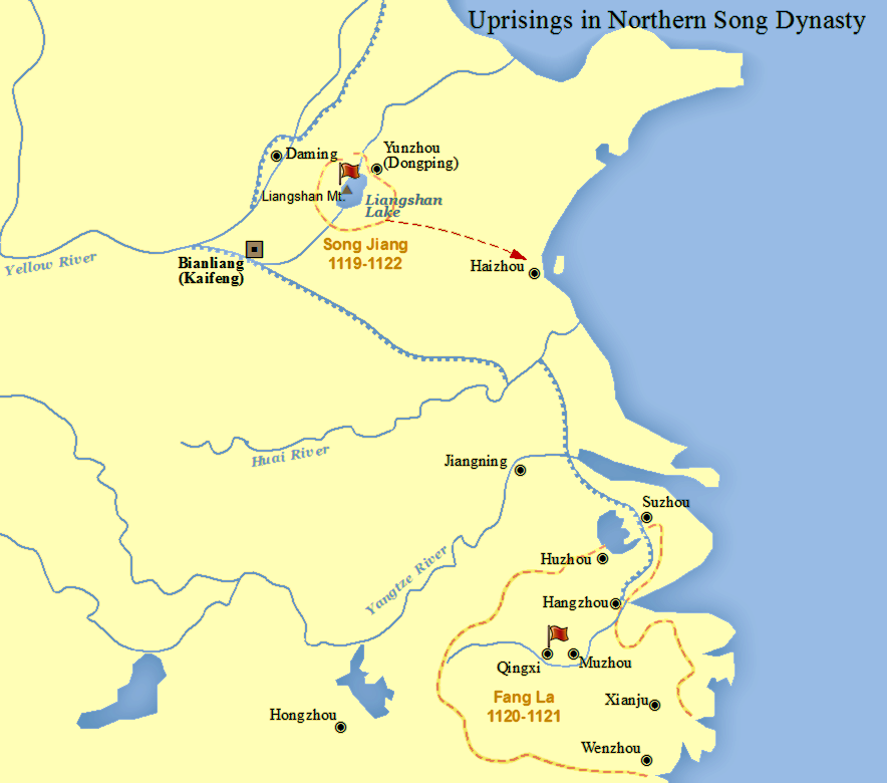
Map of Song Jiang's uprising.

Song Jiang was a Chinese rebel who led an armed uprising against the ruling Song dynasty in the early 12th century. He and his followers marauded a region straddling the present-day provinces of Shandong and Henan before they were eventually defeated by Song government forces led by Zhang Shuye and forced to surrender.

The tales of Song Jiang and his band were popular among the literati as well as with unlettered audiences from the Song onward. A fictionalised persona of the historical Song Jiang serves as a central figure in Water Margin, one of the Classic Chinese Novels. In the novel, he leads the 108 Heroes who start out as outlaws at Liangshan Marsh before receiving amnesty from and serving the Song government. As a fictional hero he greatly influenced the behavior of a number of later Chinese rebels.

== Life ==
Song Jiang is mentioned in a series of illustrations and poems by the late Song–early Yuan scholar Gong Kai, called the Encomia for the Thirty-Six Men of Song Jiang, as well as History of Song, the most authoritative records on the history of the Song dynasty. His name appears in the portion relating to Emperor Huizong (r. 1100–1126), which says:

"[In the second month of the third year of the Xuanhe era, ...] (Note: This month corresponds to 19 February to 20 March 1121 in the Gregorian calendar.) Song Jiang, a rebel from Huainan, led an armed uprising against government forces in Huaiyang. The Emperor sent troops to suppress the revolt and apprehend the rebel leader. Song Jiang then attacked the region just east of the capital (Note: The capital refers to present-day Kaifeng, the capital of the Song dynasty at the time.) and Hebei before moving to the borders of Chu (Note: Chu (楚) refers to present-day Hubei, where the Chu state of the Spring and Autumn period and Warring States period was located.) and Haizhou. (Note: Haizhou (海州) was a prefecture around present-day Lianyungang, Jiangsu.) The Emperor ordered Zhang Shuye (張叔夜), the prefect of Haizhou, to offer Song Jiang amnesty."

Another account, from the portion relating to Zhang Shuye in the History of Song, records that Song Jiang started an uprising in Heshuo (Note: Heshuo (河朔), which refers to the areas north of the Yellow River covering parts of present-day Hebei, Shanxi and Shandong provinces in China.) and overran around ten commanderies. It was said that even the government did not dare to take action against Song Jiang and the rebels. When Zhang Shuye received news that the rebels were approaching, he sent scouts to determine where they marched. Song Jiang then led his men to the coast, where they seized more than ten large boats to carry their loot. Zhang Shuye recruited about 1,000 "dare-to-die" soldiers and set up an ambush in a nearby stronghold. He then sent lightly armed troops to lure the rebels, who were some distance away on the sea, to attack them. He also hid some brawny soldiers beforehand at the seaside. When the engagement began, these soldiers sneaked onto the rebels' vessels and set them on fire. Learning what had happened, the rebels lost their morale to fight. Capitalising on this, the soldiers who were waiting in ambush captured the rebels' deputy leader(s), prompting Song Jiang to surrender."

The Dongdu Shilüe records that Hou Meng (侯蒙), the governor of Bozhou, had written a memorial to Emperor Huizong, suggesting to offer amnesty to Song Jiang and his followers and get them to fight for the Song dynasty against Fang La, another rebel leader, as a form of redemption. Although Song Jiang opposed corruption in the Song government, he still respected Emperor Huizong so he accepted the amnesty and agreed to serve under the emperor.

In 1120, Fang La started a rebellion in Muzhou and took control of Wenzhou, Taizhou, Wuzhou, Chuzhou, Hangzhou and Xiuzhou, causing a stir in the southeast. Emperor Huizong ordered Tong Guan to lead government forces, numbering over 200,000 troops, to suppress the revolt. Song Jiang, along with Liu Yanqing (劉延慶), Liu Guangshi (劉光世), and Xin Xingzong (辛興宗), was part of Tong Guan's army.

He was later deified as the god of thieves. The book collector Lang Ying (郎瑛, 1487–1566) wrote that in the lands of the Yangzi river and Jinan, people all erected temples for Song Jiang's thirty-six men.

== In Water Margin ==
Song Jiang
- Water Margin character
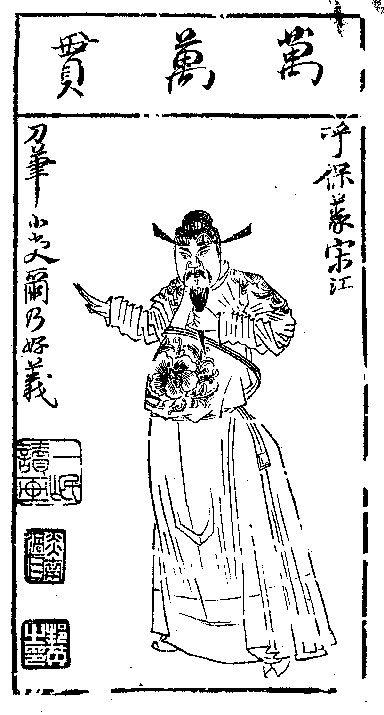
- An illustration of Song Jiang by Chen Hongshou
- First appearance: Chapter 18

In-universe information
- Aliases: Song Gongming 宋公明; "Timely Rain" 及時雨; "Filial and Righteous Dark Third Son" 孝義黑三郎; "Dark Song Jiang" 黑宋江
- Nicknames: Protector of Justice 呼保義
- Origin: magistrate's clerk
- Designation: Leader of Liangshan
- Rank: 1st, Leader Star (天魁星) of the 36 Heavenly Spirits
- Ancestral home / Place of origin: Yuncheng County, Shandong

Song Jiang is fictionalised as a central character in Water Margin, one of the Classic Chinese Novels, serving as the chief of the outlaws at Liangshan Marsh and the leader of the 108 Heroes. This character is based on his historical counterpart as well as local folktales from Shandong. One tale, for instance, mentions "36 huge banners and 72 smaller banners of local outlaws", which might be the inspiration for the 108 Heroes.

=== Background ===
In Water Margin, Song Jiang is depicted as short, swarthy, and having a big squarish mouth and eyes like those of a fenghuang. Trained in both scholarly and martial arts, he lives in Yuncheng County, where he serves as a clerk under the magistrate in the county office. He is nicknamed "Timely Rain" because of his generosity, especially towards the poor and needy. As he is also known for being filial, he is called "Filial and Righteous Dark Third Son" and "Dark Song Jiang", with "dark" referring to his complexion. After all the 108 Heroes assemble at Liangshan, he goes by another nickname, "Protector of Justice", to advertise his mission in life. He has a younger brother, Song Qing, who is also one of the 108 Heroes.

Song Jiang is a close friend of the local chief constables Zhu Tong and Lei Heng, as well as Chao Gai, the headman of Dongxi Village in Yuncheng County. After Chao Gai and six others rob a convoy of birthday gifts for the corrupt official Cai Jing, the governor of Jizhou orders He Tao, a law enforcement officer, to investigate the case and arrest the robbers. Song Jiang meets He Tao in Yuncheng County and learns that he has identified Chao Gai as the leader of the heist. Upon hearing this, Song Jiang excuses himself and rushes to Dongxi Village to warn Chao Gai and his friends, allowing them to escape and take shelter in the outlaw stronghold at Liangshan Marsh. Chao Gai later becomes the leader of the outlaw band.

=== Killing Yan Poxi ===
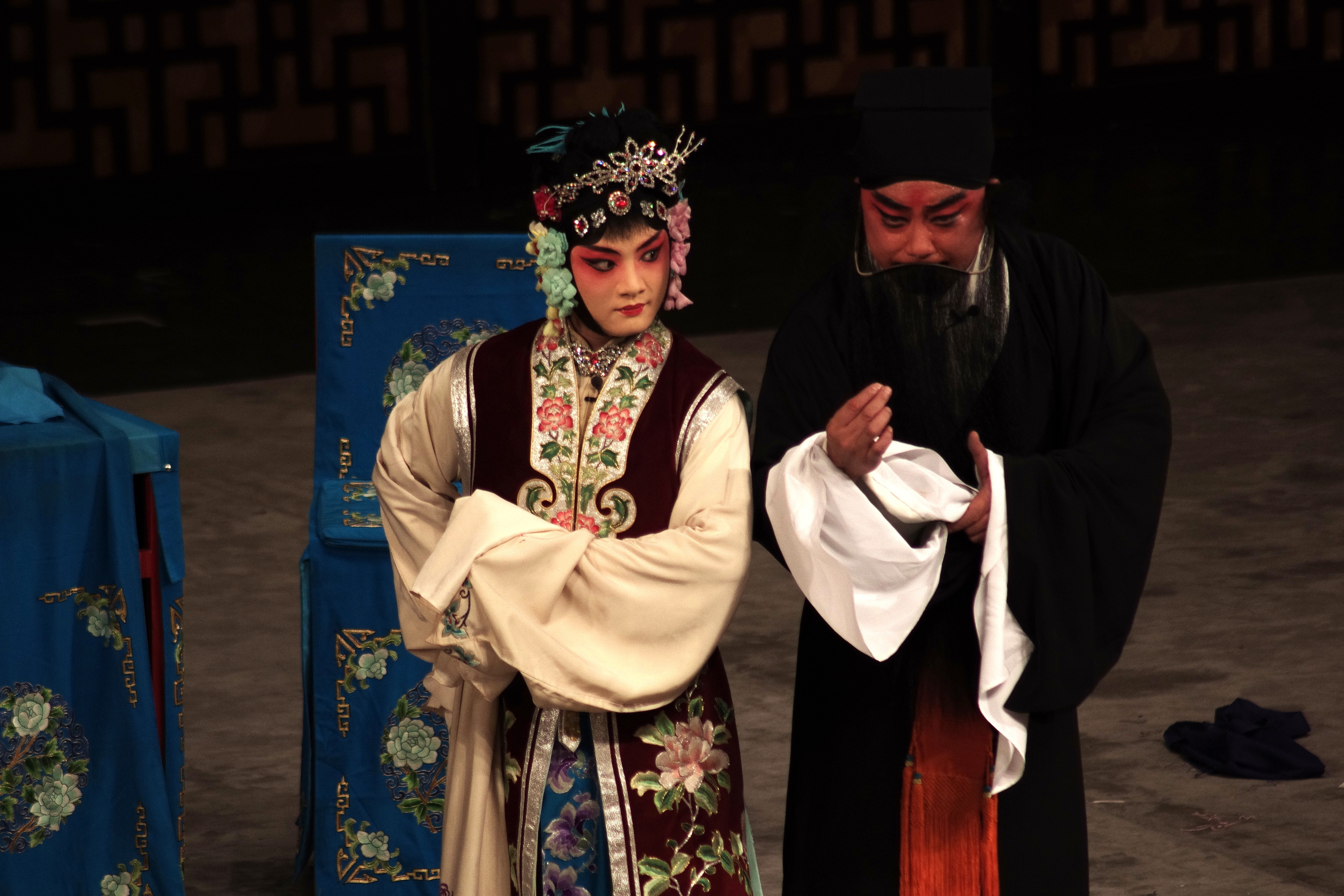
Yan Poxi and Song Jiang, from a 2015 Peking opera performance in the Tianchan Theatre in Shanghai

Meanwhile, Song Jiang has taken Yan Poxi as his concubine at her mother's insistence as a way to repay him for paying for her father's funeral. They get along well initially, but Yan Poxi soon starts disliking Song Jiang when he refuses to spend time with her. She then has an affair with Zhang Wenyuan, Song Jiang's assistant at the county office.

To convey his gratitude to Song Jiang for helping him and his friends escape, Chao Gai sends Liu Tang to pass Song Jiang a letter and some gold pieces. However, Song Jiang accepts only one gold piece as a token and declines the rest. That night, Yan Poxi finds Chao Gai's letter, revealing Song Jiang's association with the outlaws, and threatens to report Song Jiang to the authorities unless he agrees to three demands: 1) divorce her and allow her to marry Zhang Wenyuan; 2) let her keep everything he has given her so far, including the house; 3) hand over all the gold pieces. Song Jiang agrees to the first two but not the third as he only took one piece. When Yan Poxi refuses to believe him and repeatedly threatens him, Song Jiang gets agitated and kills her with a dagger. He then becomes a fugitive and runs away from Yuncheng County, with Zhu Tong secretly aiding him in his escape.

=== Battle of Qingfeng Fort ===
Song Jiang takes shelter in the residence of the nobleman Chai Jin, where he meets and befriends Wu Song. He runs into Wu Song again later after the latter has become an untonsured Buddhist pilgrim to hide his identity after killing several people in revenge. Song Jiang then goes to join Hua Rong, a military officer in Qingfeng Fort (清風寨; in present-day Qingzhou, Shandong). On the way, he is trapped and nearly killed by the three outlaw chiefs on the nearby Mount Qingfeng – Yan Shun, Wang Ying and Zheng Tianshou. As Song Jiang's reputation precedes him, the trio immediately release him and apologise upon realising who he is. Song Jiang also prevents Wang Ying from raping a woman he has abducted and gets her released when he finds out she is the wife of Liu Gao, the commandant of Qingfeng Fort.

While walking around the fort during the Lantern Festival, Song Jiang is spotted by Liu Gao's wife, who lies to her husband that Song abducted and attempted to rape her earlier. Believing his wife, Liu Gao orders Song Jiang's arrest, but Hua Rong intervenes and saves him. Both Song Jiang and Hua Rong are subsequently captured by Huang Xin, a military officer sent from Qingzhou to support Liu Gao. While Huang Xin and his men are escorting Song Jiang and Hua Rong back to Qingzhou, they are ambushed and attacked by the Mount Qingfeng outlaws. Liu Gao is killed while Huang Xin escapes; both Song Jiang and Hua Rong are rescued.

Murong Yanda, the governor of Qingzhou, then sends Qin Ming to lead troops to attack the Mount Qingfeng outlaws. Qin Ming is captured in a trap by the outlaws, who treat him respectfully and try to convince him to join them. He initially refuses but eventually becomes an outlaw as well, and even convinces Huang Xin to join them. Fearing that Murong Yanda will send more troops to crack down on them, Song Jiang urges the Mount Qingfeng outlaws to move to Liangshan Marsh and join the outlaw band there. On the way, he meets Shi Yong, who hands him a letter from Song Qing claiming that their father has passed away.

=== Exile in Jiangzhou ===
Song Jiang returns to Yuncheng County to mourn his father but finds the latter alive. It turns out that his father has faked his death to lure him home and prevent him from falling into "bad company". Soon after, Song Jiang is arrested for Yan Poxi's murder and taken before the magistrate. On account of his past service, Song Jiang is spared the death penalty and sentenced to face-tattooing and exiled to Jiangzhou (江州; present-day Jiujiang, Jiangxi).

On the way, Song Jiang and his escorts pass by Jieyang Ridge and are nearly slaughtered by the innkeeper Li Li after being drugged. He is saved by Li Jun, another of his admirers. Informed of Song Jiang's exile to Jiangzhou, Li Jun has been waiting by the Xunyang River, expecting to meet him. They revive Song Jiang after confirming his identity through the official document carried by the escorts, and treat him hospitably before seeing him off to Jiangzhou.

At Jieyang Town, Song Jiang generously tips Xue Yong, a street performer. In doing so, he offends the brothers Mu Hong and Mu Chun, who are highly influential in town and have ordered the townsfolk not to tip Xue Yong because he has not paid respect to them. While fleeing the town, Song Jiang boards a boat owned by the pirate Zhang Heng. When the boat is in the middle of the Xunyang River, Zhang Heng wants to rob and kill Song Jiang, but luckily Li Jun shows up and stops him. Li Jun then introduces Song Jiang to Zhang Heng and the Mu brothers, resolving the misunderstanding. They see Song Jiang off on his journey to Jiangzhou after that.

At the Jiangzhou prison, Song Jiang meets and befriends the warden Dai Zong, the jailer Li Kui, and Zhang Shun, Zhang Heng's younger brother. He has an easy life in Jiangzhou as he is allowed to move freely in and out of the prison. One day, he goes alone to drink at a restaurant on the bank of the Xunyang River. Feeling miserable over his misfortunes, he gets drunk and writes an apparently seditious poem on the wall, completely forgetting about it after leaving.

Huang Wenbing discovers the poem and reports it to Cai Jiu, the governor of Jiangzhou, who orders Song Jiang's arrest and sends Dai Zong to the capital Dongjing (東京; present-day Kaifeng, Henan) to seek advice from his father Cai Jing on how to deal with Song Jiang. However, Dai Zong goes to Liangshan Marsh instead to inform the outlaws of Song Jiang's arrest. The outlaws get Xiao Rang and Jin Dajian to forge a letter from Cai Jing to Cai Jiu, ordering the latter to send Song Jiang to Dongjing for further action; the plan is for the outlaws to intercept Song Jiang along the way and save him.

When Dai Zong returns to Jiangzhou with the fake letter, Cai Jiu is initially fooled by it until Huang Wenbing spots an error in the letter. A furious Cai Jiu then orders Dai Zong's arrest and sentences him and Song Jiang to death. Meanwhile, the Liangshan outlaws have realised the error and shown up in full force in Jiangzhou to storm the execution ground and rescue Song Jiang and Dai Zong. While escaping Jiangzhou, the outlaws are picked up at the riverbank by Li Jun and the friends Song Jiang made earlier, and they are all ferried safely to Liangshan Marsh, where Song Jiang becomes the second-in-command of the outlaw band.

=== As chief of Liangshan ===
A Qing dynasty illustration of Song Jiang

When Song Jiang goes home alone to fetch his family to Liangshan, news of his return is leaked out and he finds himself being pursued by the authorities. He stumbles into a temple while taking shelter and dreams of the deity Jiutian Xuannü, who gives him three books to guide him in leading the outlaws.

In almost all the battles between Liangshan and its enemies, Song Jiang serves as Liangshan's frontline commander. He leads the three assaults on the Zhu Family Village, the attack on Gaotangzhou to save Chai Jin, the battle against government forces led by Huyan Zhuo to wipe out Liangshan, the battle of Qingzhou which ends with three other outlaw groups joining Liangshan, the efforts to rescue Shi Jin and Lu Zhishen at Huazhou, the battle against Fan Rui's outlaw band at Mount Mangdang, the assault on Daming Prefecture to save Lu Junyi and Shi Xiu, the battle against government forces led by Guan Sheng, and the campaign against the Zeng Family Fortress.

After Chao Gai is killed in battle against the Zeng Family Fortress, Song Jiang serves as Liangshan's acting chief pending the capture of Shi Wengong, the man responsible for Chao Gai's death. Although Lu Junyi is ultimately the one who defeats and captures Shi Wengong, he and the other outlaws insist that Song Jiang be Liangshan's chief, so Song Jiang reluctantly accepts.

Although Song Jiang has committed egregious offences against the corrupt government and is considered a major threat, he still clings on to the hope that one day he will be pardoned and given the chance to redeem himself by serving the emperor. He crafts a slogan "Uphold Justice on Heaven's Behalf" (替天行道) to emphasise that Liangshan is committed to championing just causes on behalf of the people. Song Jiang's dream eventually comes true when he secures amnesty from Emperor Huizong for himself and the Liangshan outlaws. The emperor then sends them on campaigns against invaders from the Liao dynasty and rebel forces in Song territory to prove their loyalty. The last of these campaigns, which is against Fang La, is highly costly, with about two-thirds of the 108 Heroes killed in action or by disease.

=== Death ===
For his achievements during the campaigns, Song Jiang is appointed as an official in Chuzhou (楚州; present-day Huai'an, Jiangsu). The corrupt officials, who are jealous of him, send him an alcoholic drink laced with poison which he is obliged to consume since it was sent in the emperor's name. After Song Jiang realises he has been poisoned, he is worried that the hot-tempered Li Kui will attempt to avenge him and rebel against the emperor, tarnishing Liangshan's reputation. As such, he invites Li Kui to Chuzhou and they commit suicide together by finishing the poisoned drink.

In the last chapter of Water Margin, the ghosts of Song Jiang and Li Kui appear in Emperor Huizong's dream and tell him about their wrongful deaths. Although the emperor orders an inquiry, it comes to nothing as the key witness – the emissary who delivered the poisoned drink to Song Jiang – has died mysteriously on the way back to the capital. The emperor makes amends to Song Jiang by conferring on him an honorary posthumous title.

=== Song Jiang's seditious poem ===
The following poem was written by Song Jiang in Jiangzhou when he was drunk. The second half is believed to be carrying a seditious message.

自幼曾攻經史，長成亦有權謀。

I have read the classics and annals since I was a child,
When I grew up, I learnt politics and strategy.

恰如猛虎臥荒丘，潛伏爪牙忍受。

Just like a ferocious tiger crouching in the hills,
sheathing its claws and jaws while waiting and enduring.

不幸刺文雙頰，那堪配在江州。

How unfortunate to be branded on both cheeks,
and how wretched to be banished to Jiangzhou.

他年若得報冤讎，血染潯陽江口!

If one day I get to avenge my grievances,
the Xunyang River will be tainted with blood!

Song Jiang then reads what he has written, laughing hysterically. He consumes more drinks and starts to dance in a frenzy of joy. He picks up the inkbrush and writes another four lines:

心在山東身在吳，飄蓬江海謾嗟籲。

他時若遂淩雲誌，敢笑黃巢不丈夫!

My heart is in Shandong but I am in Wu,
I drift around aimlessly, sighing.

If one day I realise my lofty ambitions,
I will deride Huang Chao for being unmanly!

He then signs off: "The work of Song Jiang from Yuncheng" (鄆城宋江作).

The second poem is deemed seditious because of the last two lines. Huang Chao started an uprising that led to the weakening and eventual collapse of the Tang dynasty. Huang Wenbing interprets these two lines to mean: "If Song Jiang ever gets an opportunity to start a rebellion against the Song dynasty, he will do things worse than what Huang Chao had done."

== See also ==
- List of Water Margin minor characters#Song Jiang's story for a list of supporting minor characters from Song Jiang's story.
