= Zhang Shun =

Fictional character in the Chinese classical novel Water Margin

- Water Margin character
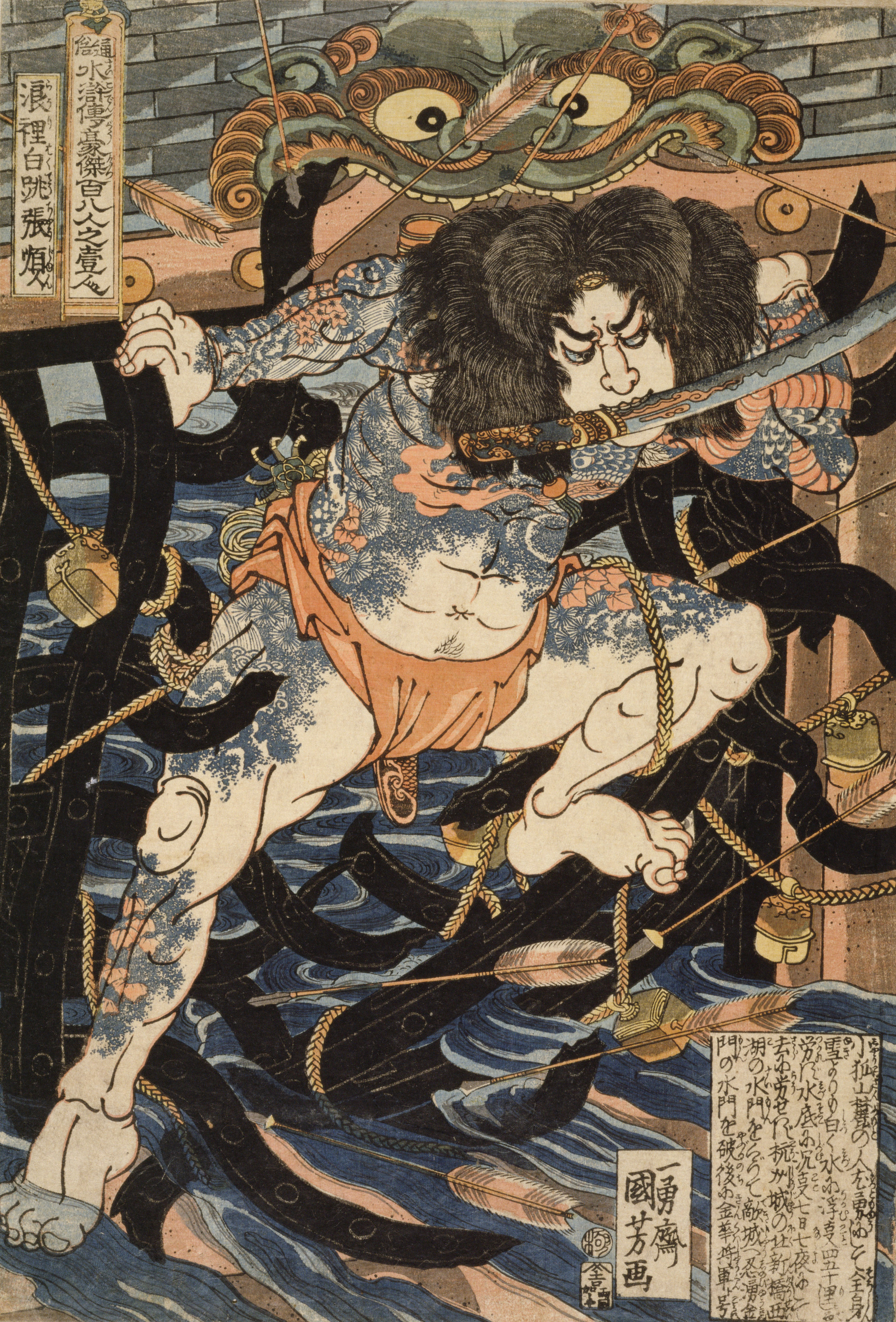
- an illustration of Zhang Shun by Utagawa Kuniyoshi
- First appearance: Chapter 37

In-universe information
- Nicknames: "White Stripe in the Waves" 浪裡白條 / "White Jumping in the Waves" 浪裡白跳
- Origin: fisherman
- Designation: Naval Commander of Liangshan
- Rank: 30th, Damage Star (天損星) of the 36 Heavenly Spirits

Chinese names
- Simplified Chinese: 张顺
- Traditional Chinese: 張順
- Pinyin: Zhāng Shùn
- Wade–Giles: Chang Shun

Zhang Shun is a fictional character in Water Margin, one of the Classic Chinese Novels. Nicknamed "White Stripe in the Waves", (Note: In older editions of the novel, Zhang Shun's nickname is "White Jumping in the Waves" (浪裡白跳), probably reflecting his ability to move in and out of the water like flying fish. In newer editions, his nickname is "White Stripe in the Waves" (浪裡白條).) he ranks 30th among the 36 Heavenly Spirits, the first third of the 108 Heroes.

== Background ==
The novel describes Zhang Shun as a six chi-tall man with a fair complexion and smooth skin. Nicknamed "White Stripe in the Waves", he is known for being an excellent swimmer who can leap in and out of water like flying fish, and hold his breath underwater for a long time. He is also a skilled fighter both on land and in the water.

Zhang Shun has an elder brother, Zhang Heng, who is a pirate pretending to be a boatman on the Xunyang River. He used to collude with Zhang Heng to rob travellers without harming anyone. Zhang Shun would disguise himself as a passenger on his brother's boat and pretend to put up a struggle when Zhang Heng "robbed" him before throwing him into the river. The other passengers, shocked by what they had witnessed, would surrender their valuables to Zhang Heng and beg for their lives. Meanwhile, Zhang Shun would stealthily swim back to the riverbank.

Zhang Shun later moves to the nearby Jiangzhou (江州; present-day Jiujiang, Jiangxi) to make a living as a fishmonger, while his brother continues to be a pirate.

== Fight with Li Kui ==
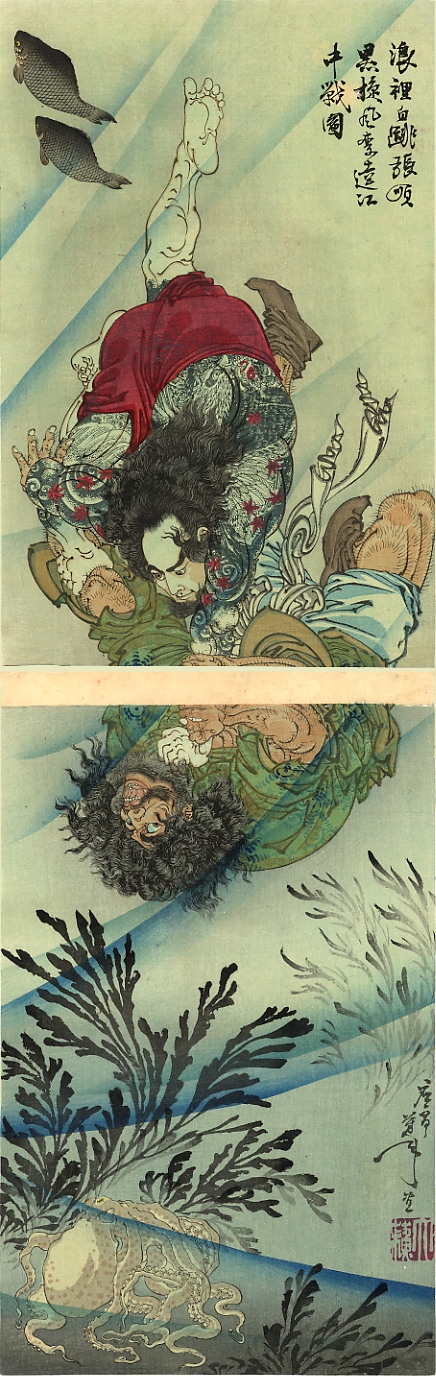
An 1887 woodblock print by Tsukioka Yoshitoshi, depicting Zhang Shun (top) wrestling with Li Kui in the Xunyang River.

Zhang Shun is first introduced in the novel when he confronts Li Kui after the latter tries to snatch fresh fish from the fishmongers at the riverside market in Jiangzhou.

After Li Kui effortlessly beats him, a dissatisfied Zhang Shun challenges Li Kui to fight him again, luring him onto a boat. Li Kui, who does not know how to swim, finds himself at a huge disadvantage when Zhang Shun rocks and overturns the boat, causing him to fall into the water. In the water, Zhang Shun easily beats up a now helpless Li Kui and continuously drags him underwater, nearly drowning him.

Luckily, Li Kui's companions Dai Zong and Song Jiang show up and stop the fight. Song Jiang, having met Zhang Shun's brother Zhang Heng earlier, introduces himself. Zhang Shun is stunned to learn that the man before him is the chivalrous and generous man he has long heard of and admires, so he gives face to Song Jiang and helps Li Kui out of the water.

Having gotten to know each other better after their fight, Li Kui and Zhang Shun make peace and become close friends.

== Becoming an outlaw ==
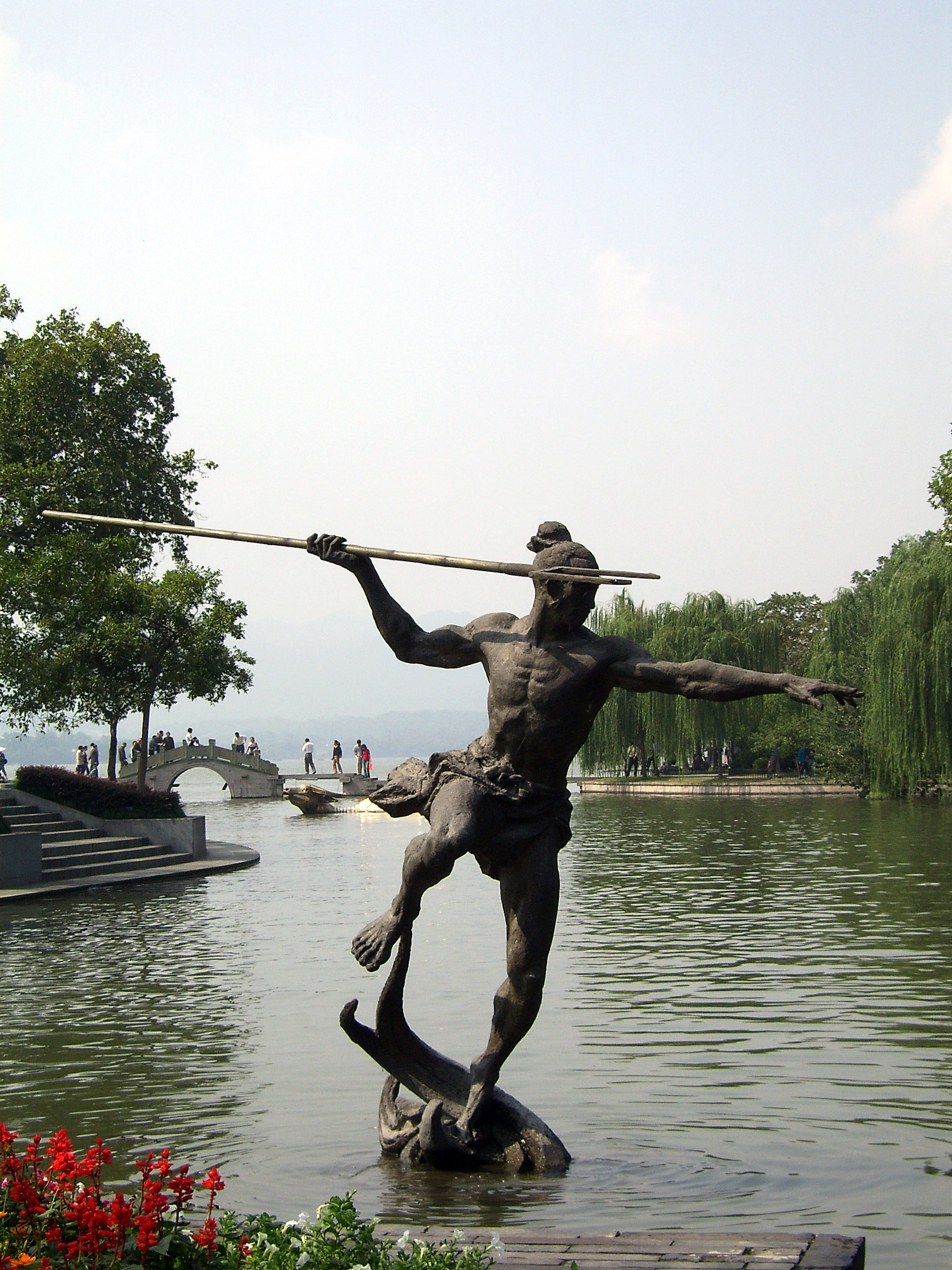
A statue of Zhang Shun at Yongjin Pond, Hangzhou.

Song Jiang later runs into trouble in Jiangzhou when he writes a seditious poem after getting drunk. He is arrested and sentenced to death, but his outlaw friends from Liangshan Marsh show up in full force, storm the execution ground, and save him.

After fleeing Jiangzhou, the whole lot gets stranded in a temple at the riverbank while government forces close in. At that moment, Zhang Shun, Zhang Heng, and the others whom Song Jiang has met and befriended earlier at Jieyang Town outside Jiangzhou suddenly appear in their boats and ferry everyone to safety. After that, Zhang Shun and the others join the outlaw band at Liangshan Marsh.

== Recruiting An Daoquan ==
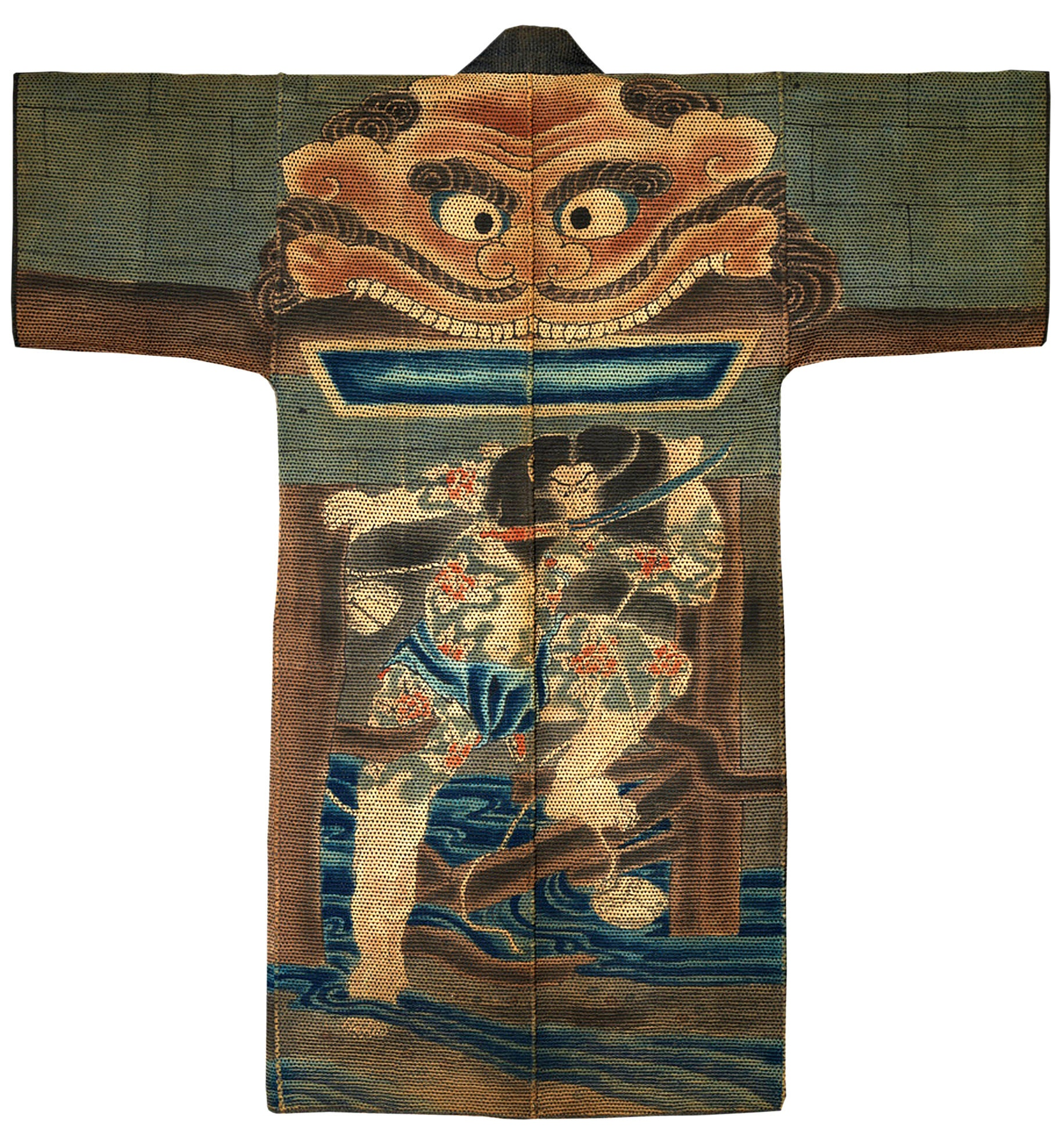
A firefighter's coat from the mid-19th century decorated with the image of Rōrihakucho Chō Jun (Zhang Shun).

When Song Jiang leads the Liangshan outlaws to attack Daming Prefecture (大名府; present-day Daming County, Hebei) to save their imprisoned comrades, he suddenly falls sick due to a tumour on his back, and gets a high fever which does not subside, resulting in him becoming delirious. The outlaws send him back to Liangshan to recover, but his condition only deteriorates and no medicine seems to be able to heal him.

Zhang Shun remembers that his mother once suffered from a similar illness and was healed by a physician called An Daoquan, so he volunteers to go to Jiankang Prefecture (建康府; present-day Nanjing, Jiangsu) to find An Daoquan and take him to Liangshan.

En route, Zhang Shun is robbed and thrown into the river by the pirate Zhang Wang, whose boat he has boarded unwarily. Underwater, he uses his exceptional marine skills to free himself of the bonds and swim to the riverbank. There, he finds a tavern run by Wang Dingliu, who provides him a dry set of clothes and lodgings before seeing him off.

In Jiankang Prefecture, Zhang Shun locates An Daoquan, who is unwilling to leave because of Li Qiaonu, a prostitute he is infatuated with. In desperation, Zhang Shun kills Li Qiaonu, whom he discovers is also having a relationship with Zhang Wang, and frames An Daoquan for the murder. He writes in blood "An Daoquan is the killer" on a wall at the crime scene, scaring the physician into fleeing Jiankang Prefecture with him.

On the way back, Zhang Shun meets Wang Dingliu again and takes him along to join the outlaw band. They encounter Zhang Wang, whose boat Wang Dingliu hires to ferry them across the river. In the middle of the river, Zhang Shun, who has been hiding his face, suddenly reveals himself and overpowers Zhang Wang with Wang Dingliu's help, and takes his revenge by tying up Zhang Wang and throwing him into the river.

At Liangshan, An Daoquan successfully heals Song Jiang, who makes a full recovery, and Zhang Shun gets the credit.

== Campaigns and death ==
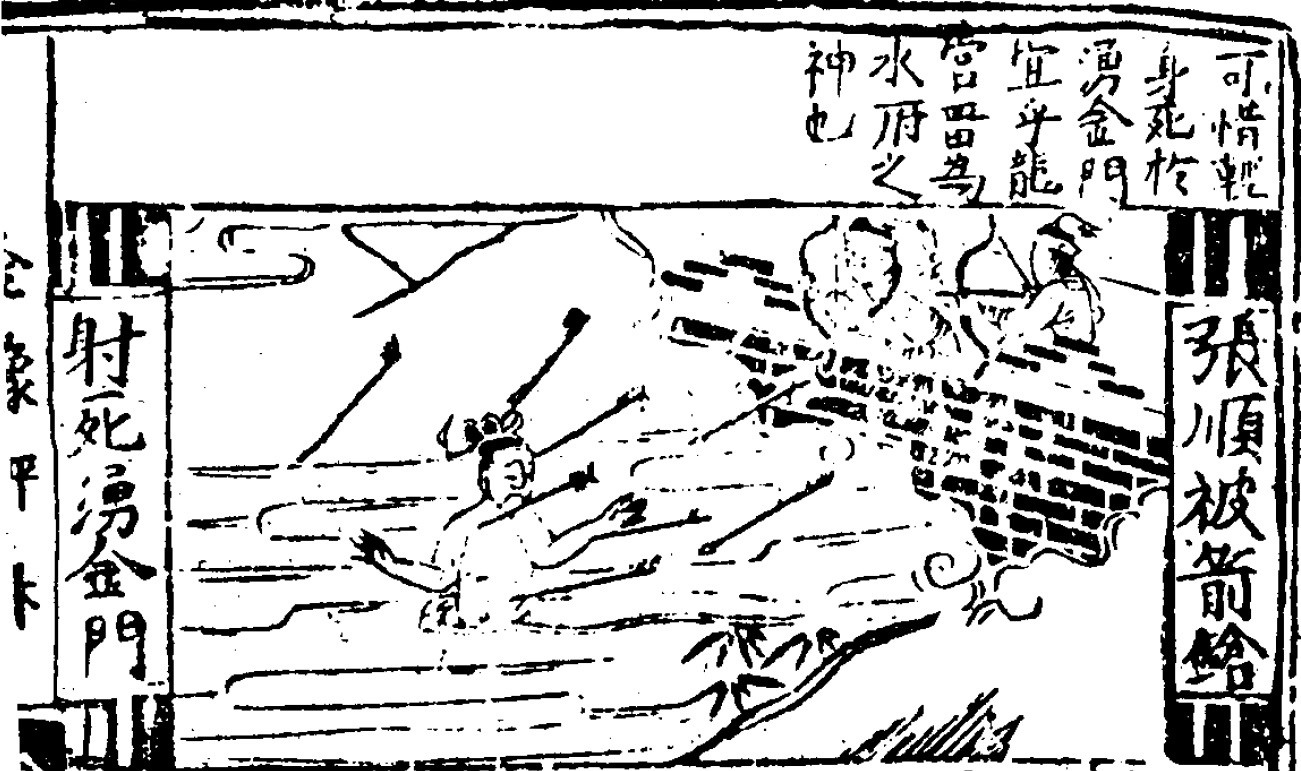
Death of Zhang Shun as seen in the Pinglin edition of Water Margin.

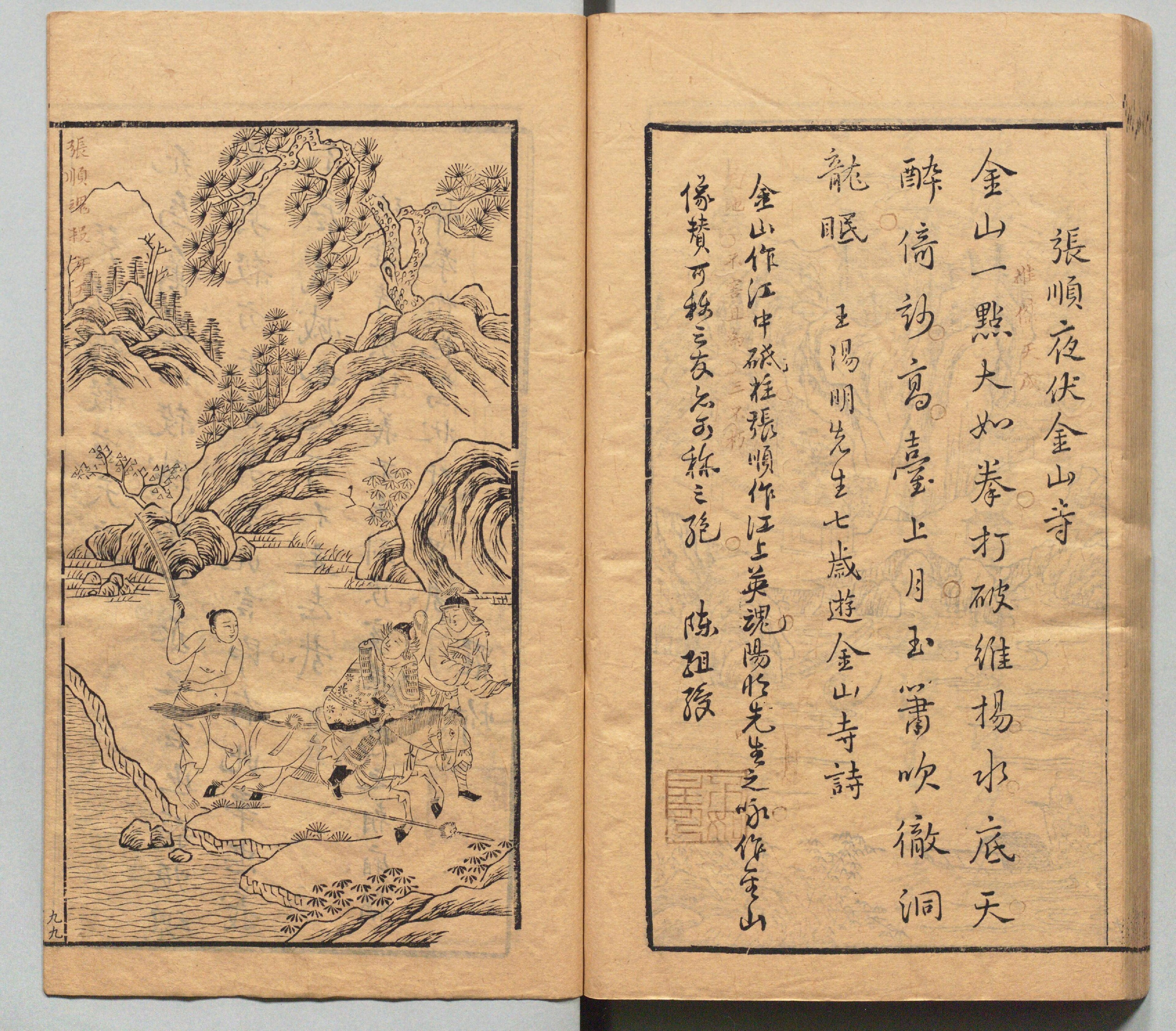
Zhang Shun's ghost catches Fang Tianding, woodblock print, published in the Second Carving Heroes' Register edition of Water Margin.

Zhang Shun is appointed as a commander of the Liangshan navy after the 108 Heroes are fully assembled. His skills are pivotal to the Liangshan victory when Gao Qiu leads government forces to destroy the outlaws. Along with Liangshan marines, he reaches the enemy ships undetected by swimming underwater, and proceeds to knock hulls in the hulls, causing the ships to sink in the marshes.

After the Liangshan outlaws receive amnesty from Emperor Huizong, Zhang Shun participates in the campaigns against the Liao invaders and rebel forces in Song territory.

During the final campaign against Fang La's rebel forces, Zhang Shun attempts to climb over a sluice gate, known as Yongjin Gate (湧金門), to infiltrate Hangzhou. However, he is spotted by Fang La's son Fang Tianding, who orders his archers to fire at Zhang Shun and kill him. After his death, Zhang Shun's spirit possesses his brother Zhang Heng and avenges himself by killing Fang Tianding in the subsequent battle of Hangzhou. His spirit then departs.

== See also ==
- List of Water Margin minor characters#Zhang Shun's story for a list of supporting minor characters from Zhang Shun's story.
