= Lei Heng =

Fictional character in the Chinese classical novel Water Margin

- Water Margin character
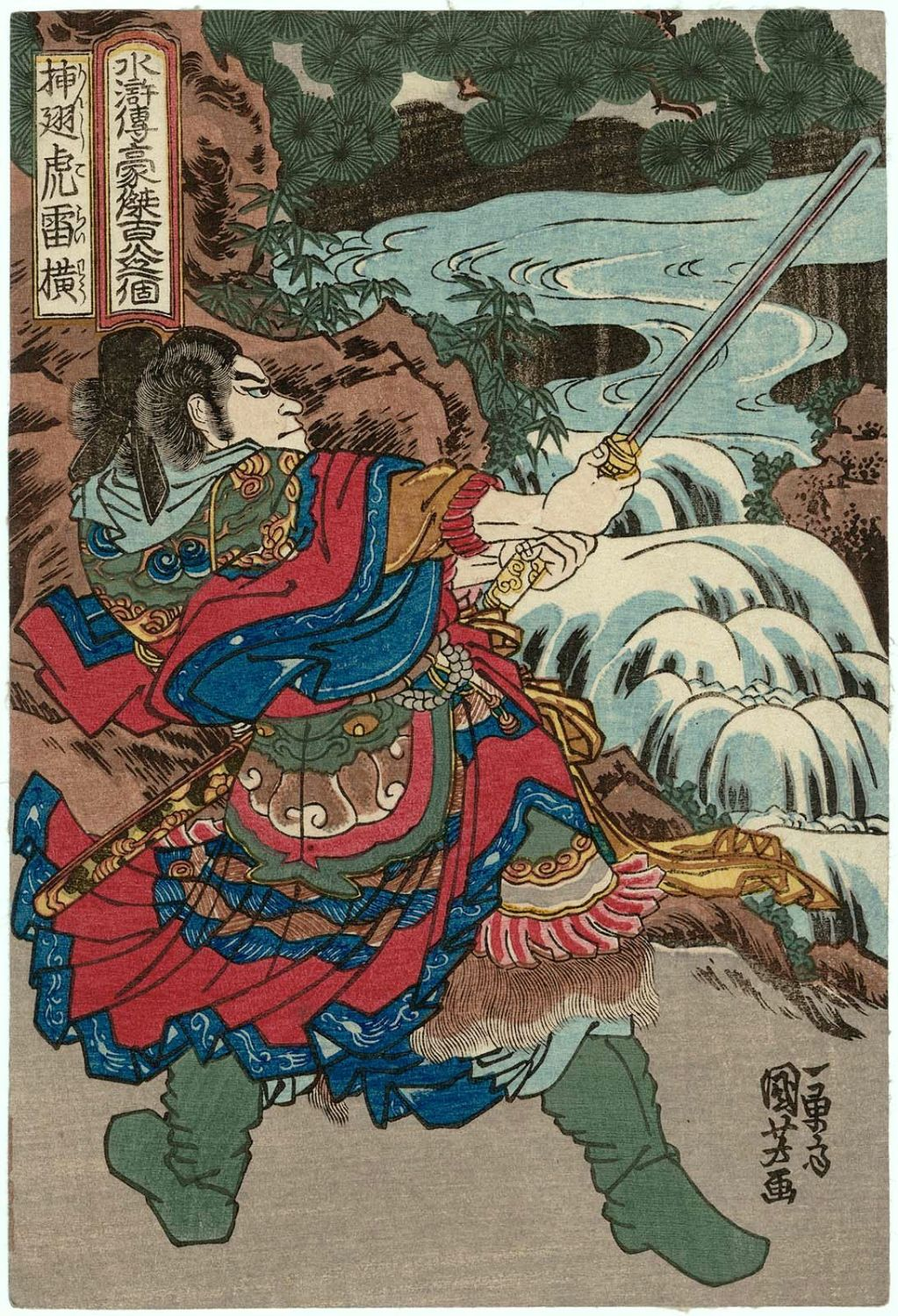
- an illustration of Lei Heng by Utagawa Kuniyoshi
- First appearance: Chapter 13

In-universe information
- Nicknames: "Winged Tiger" 插翅虎
- Weapon: podao
- Origin: blacksmith, constable
- Designation: Infantry Commander of Liangshan
- Rank: 25th, Defence Star (天退星) of the 36 Heavenly Spirits
- Ancestral home / Place of origin: Yuncheng County, Shandong

Chinese names
- Simplified Chinese: 雷横
- Traditional Chinese: 雷橫
- Pinyin: Léi Héng
- Wade–Giles: Lei Heng

Lei Heng is a fictional character in Water Margin, one of the Classic Chinese Novels. He ranks 25th among the 36 Heavenly Spirits, the first third of the 108 Heroes, and is nicknamed "Winged Tiger."

== Background ==
The novel describes Lei Heng as about seven chi tall, having a purplish face and sporting a big, fan-like beard. Athletic and highly-skilled in martial arts, he can leap over relatively wide streams and creeks, as well as fairly high walls. His talent earns him the nickname "Winged Tiger".

After starting out as a blacksmith and butcher, he becomes a chief constable in Yuncheng County, his home county. He is a close friend of Zhu Tong, the other local chief constable, and Chao Gai, the headman of Dongxi Village in the county.

== Helping Chao Gai and his friends escape ==
One night, Lei Heng and his men are on patrol when they chance upon Liu Tang, who has fallen asleep in a rundown temple after getting drunk. Suspecting that the drunk man is a wanted fugitive, Lei Heng arrests Liu Tang, who is too drunk to defend himself, and escorts him back to the county office.

When the group stops for a break at Chao Gai's house, Chao secretly checks on a now sober Liu Tang, who has come with a proposal to rob a convoy of valuable birthday gifts for the corrupt official Cai Jing. Chao Gai accepts the idea and lies to Lei Heng that Liu Tang is his maternal nephew. Lei Heng, though sceptical, decides to give face to Chao Gai and release Liu Tang. Chao Gai also gives Lei Heng some money before seeing him and his men off.

Liu Tang, still feeling bitter, catches up with and confronts Lei Heng, demanding that he apologise for the wrongful arrest and return the money to Chao Gai. After Lei Heng refuses, the two men fight and seem to be equally matched until Chao Gai shows up and stops them.

Chao Gai, Liu Tang, Wu Yong, Gongsun Sheng, and the Ruan brothers (Ruan Xiaoer, Ruan Xiaowu and Ruan Xiaoqi) later carry out the heist and make off with the valuables. The authorities investigate and soon learn that Chao Gai is one of the robbers, so the magistrate of Yuncheng County sends Lei Heng and Zhu Tong to lead their men to arrest Chao and the other six robbers.

Due to their close friendship with Chao Gai, Lei Heng and Zhu Tong secretly intend to allow Chao and his friends to flee. While Zhu Tong goes to the rear gate of Chao's house – supposedly to block their escape – Lei Heng enters from the front gate and deliberately makes loud noises to alert them. Chao and his friends eventually escape via the rear gate and make it to the outlaw stronghold at Liangshan Marsh, where Chao becomes the outlaw band's chief.

== Becoming an outlaw ==
One day, Lei Heng takes a front row seat while watching a performance by the singer Bai Xiuying and her father Bai Yuqiao without realising he has forgetten to bring money with him. He is embarrassed when they come to collect money from him after the performance. After the Bais pass some unkind remarks about him, Lei Heng loses his temper and hits Bai Yuqiao.

Unknown to Lei Heng, Bai Xiuying is having an affair with the local magistrate, so the Bais file a complaint against him. As a result, Lei Heng is stripped of his position as a chief constable, has a cangue fastened around his neck, and further humiliated by being made to stand in chains outside the county office.

When Lei Heng's mother brings food to her son, she gets into a heated quarrel with Bai Xiuying, who slaps Lei's mother. Being a filial son, Lei Heng cannot tolerate Bai Xiuying's behaviour towards his mother, so he breaks free and kills Bai Xiuying by slamming the cangue on her head.

Despite his action, Lei Heng is given a mitigated sentence due to his past service: he is exiled to Jizhou (薊州; present-day Ji County, Tianjin), with his ex-colleague and friend Zhu Tong tasked with escorting him there. Zhu Tong secretly frees Lei Heng along the way and takes the blame for "negligently" allowing the convict to escape. Lei Heng fetches his mother and heads to Liangshan Marsh to join the outlaw band there, and later gets Zhu Tong to join as well.

== Campaigns and death ==
Lei Heng is appointed as one of the commanders of the Liangshan infantry after the 108 Heroes are fully assembled. He participates in the campaigns against the Liao invaders and rebel forces in Song territory after the outlaws receive amnesty from Emperor Huizong.

During the final campaign against Fang La's rebel forces, Lei Heng is killed by the enemy warrior Si Xingfang at the battle of Deqing County. When the campaign is over, the emperor honours Lei Heng for his contributions by awarding him the posthumous title "Martial Gentleman of Loyalty" (忠武郎).

== See also ==
- List of Water Margin minor characters#Lei Heng's story for a list of supporting minor characters from Lei Heng's story.
