= Liu Tang =

Fictional character in the Chinese classical novel Water Margin

- Water Margin character
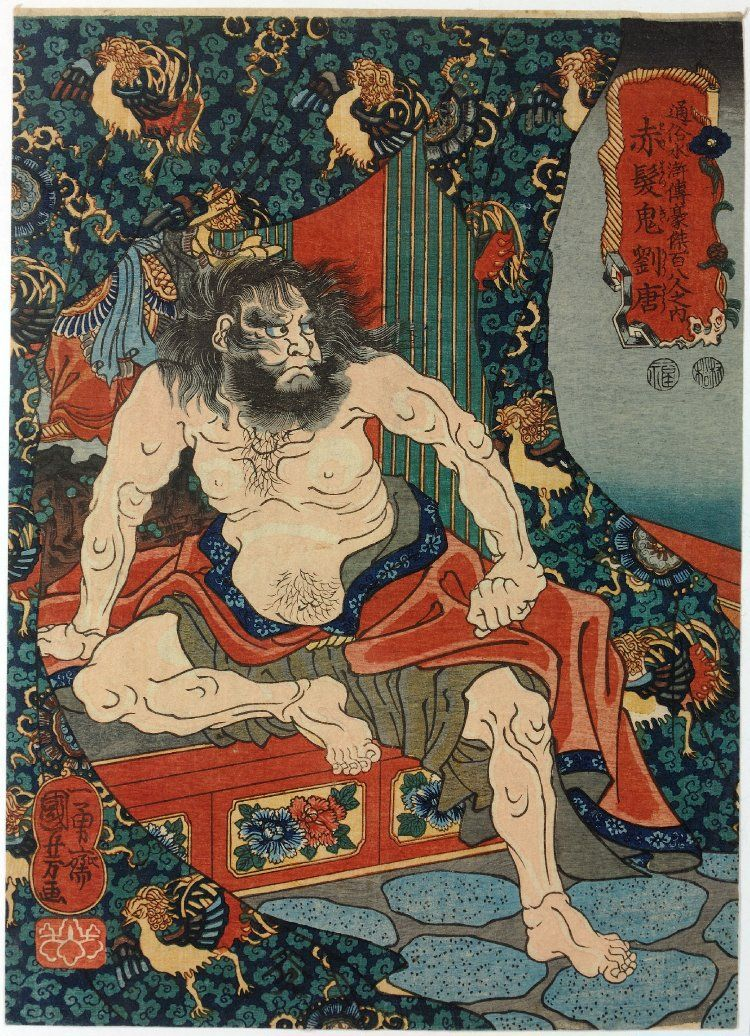
- an illustration of Liu Tang by Utagawa Kuniyoshi
- First appearance: Chapter 14

In-universe information
- Nicknames: "Red Haired Devil" 赤髮鬼
- Weapon: podao
- Origin: smuggler
- Designation: Infantry Commander of Liangshan
- Rank: 21st, Deviance Star (天異星) of the 36 Heavenly Spirits
- Ancestral home / Place of origin: Dongluzhou (around present-day Changzhi, Shanxi)

Chinese names
- Simplified Chinese: 刘唐
- Traditional Chinese: 劉唐
- Pinyin: Liú Táng
- Wade–Giles: Liu T'ang

Liu Tang is a fictional character in Water Margin, one of the Classic Chinese Novels. Nicknamed "Red Haired Devil", he ranks 21st among the 36 Heavenly Spirits, the first third of the 108 Heroes.

== Background ==
Originally from Dongluzhou (東潞州; around present-day Changzhi, Shanxi), Liu Tang is described in the novel as a muscular and dark-complexioned man. He is nicknamed "Red Haired Devil" because his hair is of a crimson hue and his broad face bears a prominent red birthmark. A highly-skilled martial artist, he specialises in the use of the podao. Having spent his early life drifting from place to place, he does smuggling in Shandong and Hebei for a living.

== Conflict with Lei Heng ==
One day, Liu Tang gets wind of a convoy of valuables being sent as birthday gifts to the corrupt official Cai Jing in the capital Dongjing (東京; present-day Kaifeng, Henan) by his son-in-law Liang Shijie, the governor of Daming Prefecture (大名府; Daming County, Hebei). He rushes to Dongxi Village in Yuncheng County to propose his idea to Chao Gai, the village headman who is well-known for his chivalry, to rob the convoy. En route, he gets drunk and falls asleep in a rundown temple near the village.

Lei Heng, a chief constable in Yuncheng County, passes by the temple that night while on patrol with his men. Noticing Liu Tang for his peculiar appearance, Lei suspects that the vagabond is a wanted fugitive. Liu, too drunk to resist, is easily taken under arrest.

While escorting Liu Tang back to the county office, Lei Heng and his men stop at Chao Gai's house for a break. Chao secretly speaks to a now sober Liu and hears his idea about the heist. After that, Chao lies to Lei that Liu is his maternal nephew and requests Liu's release. Lei, though sceptical, obliges to give face to Chao, who then gives Lei and his men some money before seeing them off.

Liu Tang, still holding a grudge against Lei Heng for wrongly arresting him, catches up with the latter and confronts him, demanding that he return the money to Chao Gai. Lei Heng refuses so they fight, with neither managing to overcome his opponent. Just then, Chao shows up and stops the fight, with both sides reluctantly pulling back to give face to Chao.

== Robbing the convoy of birthday gifts ==
Chao Gai and Liu Tang manage to form a team of seven with Wu Yong, Gongsun Sheng, and the Ruan brothers (Ruan Xiaoer, Ruan Xiaowu and Ruan Xiaoqi) to carry out the robbery.

Disguised as jujube traders, the seven men collaborate with Bai Sheng to trick the soldiers escorting the convoy into consuming alcoholic drinks spiked with menghanyao (蒙汗藥), which causes them to feel dizzy and lose consciousness. Once the soldiers are knocked out, the seven men make off with the valuables.

Following the heist, the authorities investigate and soon learn that Chao Gai is one of the robbers. Tipped off by his friend Song Jiang who is working as the local magistrate's clerk, Chao and his six companions flee and make their way to the outlaw stronghold at Liangshan Marsh, where they settle down. Chao also becomes the outlaw band's new chief, with Liu Tang taking the fifth place among the leadership.

== Life in Liangshan ==
Chao Gai later sends Liu Tang back to Yuncheng County to deliver a letter and some gold pieces to Song Jiang to thank him for helping them escape. Song Jiang secretly meets Liu Tang and accepts the letter and only one gold piece as a token before telling Liu to leave quickly since the authorities have already put up wanted notices of the seven men around the area. Song Jiang himself ultimately becomes an outlaw and joins Liangshan too.

When the Liangshan outlaws are attacking Dongchang Prefecture (東昌府; in present-day Liaocheng, Shandong), they face the warrior Zhang Qing, who flings stones with great accuracy. Zhang Qing has already defeated many of Liangshan's best fighters on horseback with his stones. Liu Tang steps forth and challenges Zhang Qing to fight him on foot, but gets knocked down and captured after Zhang flings a stone that hits him in the face. He is freed after Zhang Qing surrenders and joins the outlaws.

== Campaigns and death ==
Liu Tang is appointed as a commander of the Liangshan infantry after the 108 Heroes are fully assembled. He participates in the campaigns against the Liao invaders and rebel forces in Song territory after the outlaws receive amnesty from Emperor Huizong.

During the final campaign against Fang La's rebel forces, Liu Tang is assigned to attack Hangzhou. When he sees that the city gate is open, he is eager to gain the top credit for victory so he charges in unsuspectingly. A beam falls on him when he passes the gate, crushing him to death instantly. When the campaign is over, the emperor honours him for his contributions by awarding him the posthumous title "Martial Gentleman of Loyalty" (忠武郎).
