= Chao Gai =

Fictional character in the Chinese classical novel Water Margin

- Water Margin character
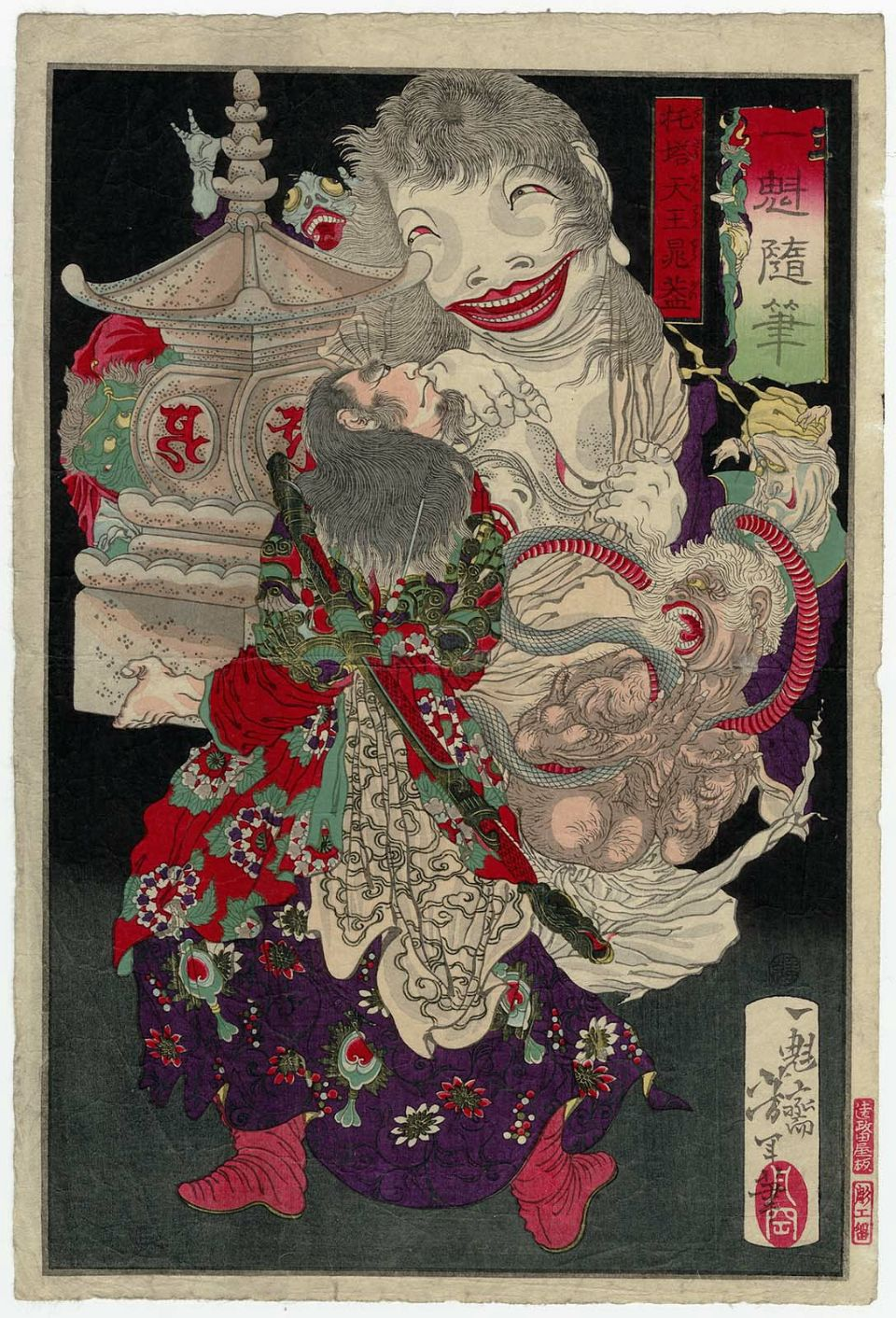
- an illustration of Chao Gai by Tsukioka Yoshitoshi
- First appearance: Chapter 14

In-universe information
- Alias: "Heavenly King Chao" 晁天王
- Nickname: "Pagoda-Shifting Heavenly King" 托塔天王
- Origin: village chief
- Designation: Leader of Liangshan
- Ancestral home / Place of origin: Dongxi Village, Yuncheng County, Shandong

Chinese names
- Simplified Chinese: 晁盖
- Traditional Chinese: 晁蓋
- Pinyin: Cháo Gài
- Wade–Giles: Ch'ao Kai

Chao Gai, nicknamed "Pagoda-Shifting Heavenly King", is a fictional character in Water Margin, one of the Classic Chinese Novels. In the novel, he is the chief of the outlaw band based at Liangshan Marsh, but he is not one of the 108 Heroes as he is killed in battle before the 108 Heroes are fully assembled. After his death, he serves as a spiritual guardian of the 108 Heroes, who periodically dedicate ceremonial sacrifices to him.

== Background ==
Chao Gai earned his nickname "Pagoda-Shifting Heavenly King" after carrying a pagoda miniature from the west side of a creek to the east, where his village stood, to deter malevolent spirits. His fellows commonly refer to him as "Heavenly King Chao". Born in a wealthy family, he serves as the baozheng (保正; a chief of a village with 500 households) of Dongxi Village (東溪村; "Eastern Creek Village") in Yuncheng County, Shandong. Apart from having a wide network of friends and acquaintances throughout the jianghu, he also maintains close friendships with the local chief constables Zhu Tong and Lei Heng.

== Robbing the convoy of birthday gifts ==
When Chao Gai's friend Liu Tang receives news that a convoy escorting some birthday gifts for the corrupt official Cai Jing will be passing by Dongxi Village, he wants to rob the convoy and plans to get Chao Gai to help him. During his journey to Dongxi Village, he gets drunk and falls asleep in a rundown temple. Lei Heng, who passes by the temple, suspects that Liu Tang is a fugitive so he arrests him. On the way back to the county office, Lei Heng visits Chao Gai at Dongxi Village. While Lei Heng is enjoying the village's hospitality, Chao Gai surreptitiously meets Liu Tang and finds out what happened. He then lies to Lei Heng that Liu Tang is a distant relative of his, so Lei Heng releases Liu Tang.

Chao Gai teams up with six others, including Liu Tang, to rob the convoy. They disguise themselves as jujube traders and, with Bai Sheng's help, trick the escorts into consuming alcoholic drinks spiked with drugs that will make them unconscious.

Once the unsuspecting escorts are knocked out, Chao Gai and his friends escape with the birthday gifts. After the incident, the authorities order He Tao, a law enforcement officer, to track down and arrest the robbers. Bai Sheng carelessly reveals his role in the robbery and ends up being arrested. Despite being tortured, Bai Sheng refuses to name his accomplices even though He Tao already knows that Chao Gai is one of them.

== Becoming an outlaw ==
Song Jiang secretly warns Chao Gai and his friends that they are wanted by the authorities, and advises them to flee immediately. In the meantime, the local magistrate orders Zhu Tong and Lei Heng to lead soldiers to arrest Chao Gai and the other six men. However, due to their close friendships with Chao Gai, the two chief constables secretly help him and his friends escape.

After defeating the soldiers sent to arrest them, Chao Gai and his friends retreat to Liangshan Marsh and join an outlaw band led by Wang Lun. Wang Lun feels that Chao Gai and his friends pose a threat to him so he tries to send them away with gifts and excuses. During this time, Wu Yong instigates Lin Chong, who is already disgruntled with Wang Lun, to turn against Wang Lun. Lin Chong kills Wang Lun, and then pledges his support to Chao Gai, who becomes the new chief of the outlaw band at Liangshan.

Throughout his tenure as Liangshan's chief, Chao Gai hardly participates in battles against Liangshan's enemies. For the most part, he lets Song Jiang lead Liangshan forces into battle while he remains behind to guard their base and provide reinforcements.

== Death and legacy ==
On one occasion, the Zeng brothers of the Zeng Family Fortress rob a precious steed from Duan Jingzhu, who originally intended to present it as a gift to Chao Gai. The Zengs have all along been hostile towards Liangshan and have put up slogans around their fortress to insult Liangshan's leaders. After the Zengs ambush and injure Liu Tang for no apparent reason, Chao Gai personally leads Liangshan forces to attack the fortress.

In the midst of battle, Chao Gai is hit in the forehead by a poison-coated arrow fired by Shi Wengong, a martial arts instructor in the fortress. Chao Gai dies of poisoning shortly afterwards. Before his death, he says, "Whoever captures Shi Wengong and avenges me will be the next chief of Liangshan". Although Lu Junyi turns out to be the one who defeats and captures Shi Wengong, Song Jiang ultimately succeeds Chao Gai as Liangshan's chief when Lu Junyi and the other outlaw chieftains insist that Song Jiang be their leader.

Chao Gai's character is entirely consistent with the ideas presented in the Liangshan outlaws' manifesto of "upholding justice on Heaven's behalf". His personal history as an official-turned-outlaw also portends the Liangshan way of life and their subsequent methods of recruiting members who previously served the corrupt government.

== See also ==
- List of Water Margin minor characters § Chao Gai's story for a list of supporting minor characters from Chao Gai's story.
