= Yuncheng County =

Yuncheng County 郓城县
- County
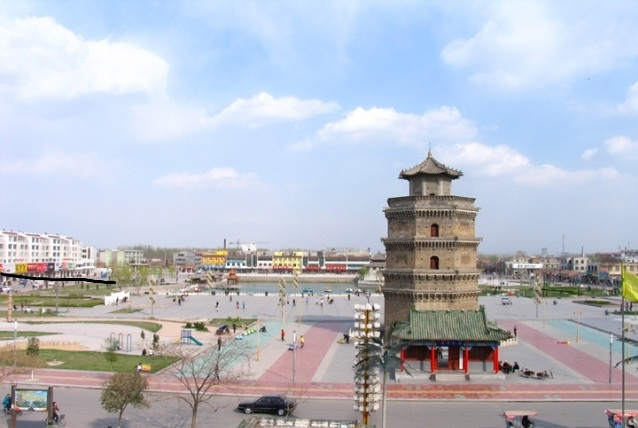

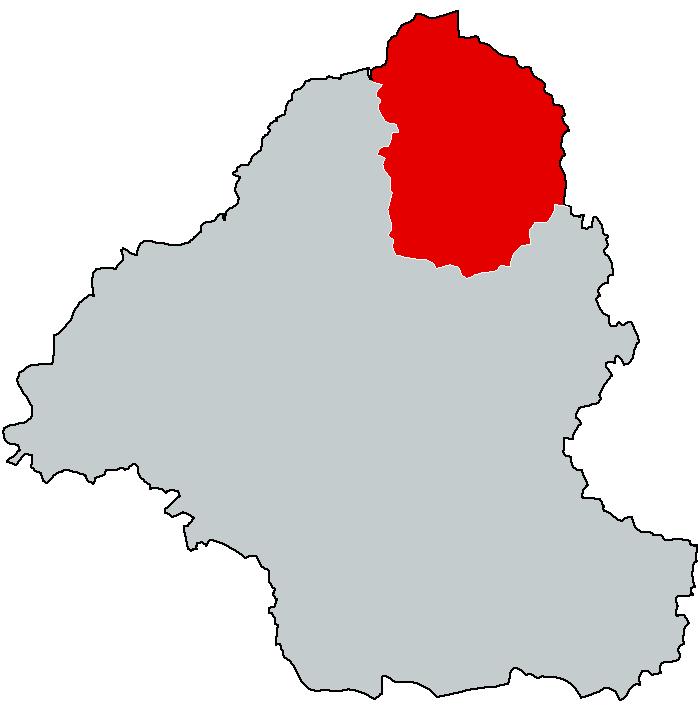
- Yuncheng in Heze

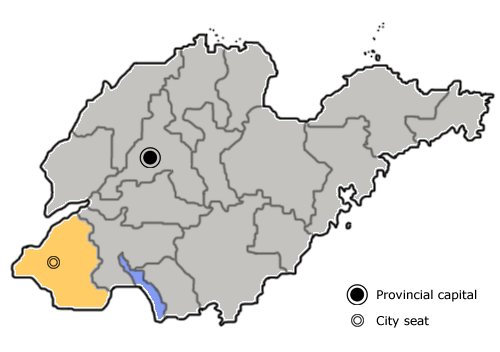
- Heze in Shandong
- Coordinates: 35°35′59″N 115°56′37″E
- Country: People's Republic of China
- Province: Shandong
- Prefecture-level city: Heze

Area
  - Total: 1,643 km^{2} (634 sq mi)

Population (2019)
  - Total: 1,116,400
  - Density: 679.5/km^{2} (1,760/sq mi)
- Time zone: UTC+8 (China Standard)
- Postal code: 274700
- Area code: 0530

Yuncheng (simplified Chinese: 郓城; traditional Chinese: 鄆城; pinyin: Yùnchéng) is a county in the southwest of Shandong province, China. It is the northernmost county-level division of the prefecture-level city of Heze. It borders the Yellow River and Henan (Taiqian County and Fan County) to the north, Liangshan County to the northeast, Jiaxiang County to the east, Juye County to the southeast, and Mudan District to the southwest, and Juancheng County to the west. It stretches 44 km (27 mi) from north to south and 36 km (22 mi) from east to west.

== Administrative divisions ==
As of 2012, this County is divided to 2 subdistricts, 15 towns and 5 townships.

Subdistricts

- Yunzhou Subdistrict (郓州街道)
- Tangta Subdistrict (唐塔街道)

Towns

- Huang'an (黄安镇)
- Yangzhuangji (杨庄集镇)
- Houyanji (侯咽集镇)
- Wu'an (武安镇)
- Guotun (郭屯镇)
- Dinglichang (丁里长镇)
- Yuhuangmiao (玉皇庙镇)
- Chengtun (程屯镇)
- Suiguantun (随官屯镇)
- Zhangying (张营镇)
- Pandu (潘渡镇)
- Shuangqiao (双桥镇)
- Tangmiao (唐庙镇)
- Nanzhaolou (南赵楼镇)
- Huangduiji (黄堆集镇)

Townships

- Huangji Township (黄集乡)
- Liji Township (李集乡)
- Zhangluji Township (张鲁集乡)
- Shuibao Township (水堡乡)
- Chenpo Township (陈坡乡)

== Climate ==
Climate data for Yuncheng, elevation 46 m (151 ft), (1991–2020 normals, extremes 1951–present)
Month	Jan	Feb	Mar	Apr	May	Jun	Jul	Aug	Sep	Oct	Nov	Dec	Year
Record high °C (°F)	16.7 (62.1)	27.3 (81.1)	31.7 (89.1)	33.6 (92.5)	39.8 (103.6)	41.0 (105.8)	42.4 (108.3)	39.0 (102.2)	36.9 (98.4)	35.0 (95.0)	29.8 (85.6)	21.4 (70.5)	42.4 (108.3)
Mean daily maximum °C (°F)	4.7 (40.5)	8.8 (47.8)	15.0 (59.0)	21.5 (70.7)	26.7 (80.1)	31.5 (88.7)	32.0 (89.6)	30.6 (87.1)	27.1 (80.8)	21.6 (70.9)	13.4 (56.1)	6.5 (43.7)	20.0 (67.9)
Daily mean °C (°F)	−0.4 (31.3)	3.2 (37.8)	9.1 (48.4)	15.5 (59.9)	21.0 (69.8)	25.9 (78.6)	27.4 (81.3)	26.1 (79.0)	21.5 (70.7)	15.5 (59.9)	7.8 (46.0)	1.5 (34.7)	14.5 (58.1)
Mean daily minimum °C (°F)	−4.0 (24.8)	−0.9 (30.4)	4.3 (39.7)	10.2 (50.4)	15.7 (60.3)	20.8 (69.4)	23.7 (74.7)	22.6 (72.7)	17.4 (63.3)	11.0 (51.8)	3.8 (38.8)	−2.0 (28.4)	10.2 (50.4)
Record low °C (°F)	−18.7 (−1.7)	−16.1 (3.0)	−11.6 (11.1)	−4.2 (24.4)	2.6 (36.7)	10.1 (50.2)	14.2 (57.6)	12.5 (54.5)	2.3 (36.1)	−2.5 (27.5)	−13.3 (8.1)	−16.3 (2.7)	−18.7 (−1.7)
Average precipitation mm (inches)	6.2 (0.24)	11.8 (0.46)	15.9 (0.63)	32.3 (1.27)	50.7 (2.00)	69.0 (2.72)	180.1 (7.09)	135.6 (5.34)	67.7 (2.67)	30.0 (1.18)	29.8 (1.17)	8.5 (0.33)	637.6 (25.1)
Average precipitation days (≥ 0.1 mm)	2.9	3.5	3.7	5.3	6.4	7.5	10.8	9.9	7.5	5.3	4.9	2.9	70.6
Average snowy days	3.2	2.8	0.8	0.2	0	0	0	0	0	0	0.9	2.0	9.9
Average relative humidity (%)	64	60	57	63	66	65	79	82	76	69	69	67	68
Mean monthly sunshine hours	139.4	148.1	195.8	218.8	239.2	218.4	189.6	181.7	175.4	172.7	148.7	139.6	2,167.4
Percentage possible sunshine	45	48	53	55	55	50	43	44	48	50	49	46	49
Source: China Meteorological Administration

== Transportation ==
- China National Highway 220
- Yuncheng railway station

== Notable natives ==
- Peng Liyuan, Spouse of President and paramount leader
- Ma Xingrui, scientist and former party chief of Shenzhen
