= All Men Are Brothers (TV series) =

2011 Chinese television series

- Intertitle
- Also known as: The Water Margin
- 水浒传
- Genre: Costume drama, martial arts
- Based on: Water Margin by Shi Nai'an
- Screenplay by: Wen Haojie; Zhao Shuai; Zhang Qiyin; Gong Shangjuan; Wu Tong; Chang Qingtian; Zhang Duo; Sun Pingyang; Cheng Simin; Lu Ran; Zeng Lu; Chen Guoxuan; Liao Chunshan; Li Li; Yang Yue
- Directed by: Kuk Kwok-leung; Zou Jicheng
- Presented by: Zhang Lijun; Han Guoqiang; Wang Dafang; Guo Li; Yu Dong; Cheng Lidong; Yang Zi; Fu Yiwei
- Starring: Zhang Hanyu; Calvin Li; Hu Dong; Huang Haibing; Chen Long; Jing Gangshan; Zhao Hu; Yan Kuan; Ady An
- Opening theme: "Innumerable Brothers" (兄弟无数) by Jing Gangshan
- Ending theme: "Alliance of the Four Seas" (四海盟约) by Mao Amin
- Composer: Zhou Zhiyong
- Country of origin: China
- Original language: Mandarin
- No. of episodes: 86

Production
- Executive producers: Zou Saiguang; Cheng Lidong; Zhang Suzhou
- Producers: Ning Caishen; He Ling; Zhao Hongmei; Wan Zihong; Sheng Luosong; Wu Guoqing
- Production location: China
- Editor: Chang Yang
- Running time: ≈45 minutes per episode
- Production companies: Beijing Yangguang Sheng Tong Culture Art; Bona Film Group; Beijing Da You Xinyi Film; Beijing Ruyi Jixiang Film; VODone; Shandong TV; Tianjin Film Production; Shanghai Media Group; Chongqing Broadcasting Group; Anhui TV; Heilongjiang TV; Tianjin TV; Sichuan TV; Guangdong TV; Fujian TV; Jilin TV; Yunnan TV; Zhejiang TV; Beijing TV; Jiangsu TV

Original release
- Network: 8TV
- Release: 1 March 2011 – 2011

DVD cover art

All Men Are Brothers (水浒传) is a 2011 Chinese television series adapted from the 14th-century classical novel Water Margin by Shi Nai'an, one of the Four Great Classical Novels of Chinese literature. The series is directed by Kuk Kwok-leung and features cast members from mainland China, Taiwan, and Hong Kong. The series was first broadcast on 8TV in March 2011 in Malaysia.

== List of episodes ==
#	Rough translation of title (in English)	Original title (in Chinese)
1	Marshal Hong accidentally releases the demons	洪太尉误走妖魔
2	The Seven Stars gather in Shijie Village	石碣村七星聚义
3	"Nine Tattooed Dragons" Secretly Leaves Dongjing	九纹龙私走东京城
4	Major Lu helps Jin Cuilian	鲁提辖义助金翠莲
5	Beating up "Lord of the West"	拳打镇关西
6	Lu Da becomes a monk in Wenshu Monastery	鲁达剃度文殊寺
7	"Panther Head" enters the White Tiger Hall by mistake	豹子头误入白虎堂
8	Uprooting a willow tree	倒拔垂杨柳
9	Chaos in Wild Boars Forest	大闹野猪林
10	Lin Chong defeats Instructor Hong	林冲棒打洪教头
11	Lu Zhishen burns Waquan Monastery	智深火烧瓦罐寺
12	Instructor Lin encounters snow and wind at the Temple of the Mountain Deity	林教头风雪山神庙
13	Forced to go to Liangshan	逼上梁山
14	Yang Zhi sells his saber	杨志卖刀
15	Robbing the convoy of birthday gifts	智取生辰纲
16	Song Gongming secretly releases Heavenly King Chao	宋公明私放晁天王
17	Killing Wang Lun	火并王伦
18	Song Jiang marries Yan Xijiao	宋江收娶阎惜娇
19	Zhang Wenyuan's romance in Wulong Manor	张文远情陷乌龙院
20	Killing Yan Xijiao	坐楼杀惜
21	Taking Mount Twin Dragons by wit	智取二龙山
22	Wu Song slays the tiger	武松打虎
23	Pan Jinlian encounters Ximen Qing	潘金莲竿打西门庆
24	Pan Jinlian attempts to seduce Wu Erlang	金莲醉诱武二郎
25	Granny Wang accepts a bribe in greed and stirs up romantic feelings	王婆贪贿说风情
26	Granny Wang instigates Ximen Qing	王婆计唆西门庆
27	A wicked woman poisons Wu Dalang	恶妇药鸩武大郎
28	Wu Song kills his sister-in-law	武松杀嫂
29	"Female Yaksha" runs an inn at Cross Slope	十字坡母夜叉开店
30	Wu Song helps Shi En	武松援手助施恩
31	Beating up "Jiang the Door God"	醉打蒋门神
32	Chaos at Flying Cloud Pool	大闹飞云浦
33	Bloodbath at Mandarin Ducks Tower	血溅鸳鸯楼
34	Song Jiang spends the night in Qingfeng Fort	宋江夜宿清风寨
35	Hua Rong fires an arrow at "Fiery Thunderbolt"	花荣箭射霹雳火
36	Song Jiang meets Li Jun at Jieyang Ridge	揭阳岭宋江逢李俊
37	"Black Whirlwind" fights "White Stripe in the Waves"	黑旋风斗浪里白条
38	Writing a seditious poem at Xunyang Restaurant	浔阳楼题反诗
39	"Magic Traveller" delivers a fake letter	神行太保传假信
40	The heroes of Liangshan Marsh storm the execution ground	梁山泊好汉劫法场
41	Zhang Shun captures Huang Wenbing	张顺活捉黄文炳
42	The real and fake Li Kui	真假李逵
43	"Daredevil Third Brother" becomes sworn brothers with "Sick Guan Suo"	拼命三郎结拜病关索
44	Yang Xiong gets drunk and scolds Pan Qiaoyun	杨雄醉骂潘巧云
45	Shi Qian steals a hen in the Zhu Family Village	祝家庄时迁偷鸡
46	"Striking Hawk" writes a letter about life and death twice	扑天雕双修生死书
47	"Ten Feet of Blue" captures "Stumpy Tiger"	一丈青单捉矮脚虎
48	Three Assaults on the Zhu Family Village	三打祝家庄
49	Wang Ying's marriage	王英娶亲
50	"Lord of the Beautiful Beard" loses a child by carelessness	美髯公误失小衙内
51	"Dragon in the Clouds" conquers Gaotangzhou in a battle of magic	入云龙斗法破高唐
52	"Flea on a Drum" steals the armour	鼓上蚤盗甲
53	Defeating the chain-linked cavalry	大破连环马
54	Song Jiang braves danger by crossing three mountains	过三山宋江涉险
55	Wu Yong risks his life to persuade the Tigers	吴用换命说众虎
56	The three mountains submit to the Marsh	三山同心归水泊
57	Attacking the Zeng Family Fortress at night	夜打曾头市
58	Heavenly King Chao is wounded by an arrow	晁天王中箭
59	"Resourceful Wizard" wins over "Jade Unicorn" by cunning	智多星计赚玉麒麟
60	Lu Junyi hits Yan Qing by mistake	卢俊义错打燕小乙
61	Shi Xiu risks his life to storm the execution ground	劫法场石秀拼命
62	Song Jiang attacks Daming Prefecture	宋江兵打大名府
63	"Female Tiger" sends a letter by night	母大虫夜传信
64	"Great Blade" discusses conquering Liangshan Marsh	大刀关胜议取梁山泊
65	"Divine Physician" An Daoquan heals Song Jiang	安道全神医救宋江
66	"Timely Rain" gives up his place to "Jade Unicorn"	及时雨让位玉麒麟
67	Lu Junyi captures Shi Wengong	卢俊义活捉史文恭
68	Song Gongming righteously releases "General of Double Spears"	宋公明义释双枪将
69	"Featherless Arrow" defeats the heroes with flying stones	没羽箭飞石打英雄
70	The Grand Assembly of the heroes of Liangshan Marsh	梁山泊英雄排座次
71	"Black Whirlwind" tears down the yellow banner in anger	黑旋风怒砍杏黄旗
72	Li Kui admits his mistake	李逵负荆
73	Yan Qing's leitai match	燕青打擂
74	Li Kui becomes a magistrate in Shouzhang County	寿张县李逵乔坐衙
75	The Ruan brothers make fun of the imperial envoy	阮氏三雄戏钦差
76	The Five Tiger Generals defeat Tong Guan	五虎上将打童贯
77	The heroes taunt Marshal Gao	众好汉奚落高太尉
78	Capturing Gao Qiu in the marine battle	水战擒高俅
79	The heroes of Liangshan Marsh are granted amnesty	水泊梁山全伙受招安
80	Yan Qing bids Li Shishi farewell	燕青惜别李师师
81	The male and female "Featherless Arrow"s encounter each other at Fangyan Mountain	雌雄没羽箭斗会方岩山
82	The heroes attack Fang La	梁山奉诏讨方腊
83	Zhang Shun's death at Yongjin Gate	张顺魂归涌金门
84	Wu Song captures Fang La with one arm	武松单臂擒方腊
85	Song Gongming returns to his hometown in glory	宋公明衣锦还乡
86	Loyalty and righteousness reach high to the sky	忠义参天

== Cast ==
=== Liangshan heroes ===
- Ray Lui as Chao Gai
- Zhang Hanyu as Song Jiang
- Wang Jianxin as Lu Junyi
- Calvin Li as Wu Yong
- Jing Gangshan as Gongsun Sheng
- Bao Ligao as Guan Sheng
- Hu Dong as Lin Chong
- Zhao Qiusheng as Qin Ming
- Yan Hongzhi as Huyan Zhuo
- Zhang Di as Hua Rong
- Huang Haibing as Chai Jin
- Bai Jiancai as Li Ying
- Yu Yankai as Zhu Tong
- Jin Song as Lu Zhishen
- Chen Long as Wu Song
- Yu Bo as Dong Ping
- Zhang Xiaochen as Zhang Qing
- Gao Hu as Yang Zhi
- Wang Li as Xu Ning
- Liu Hailong as Suo Chao
- Yu Boning as Dai Zong
- Kou Zhanwen as Liu Tang
- Kang Kai as Li Kui
- Han Dong as Shi Jin
- Sun Xiaofei as Mu Hong
- Bai Hailong as Lei Heng
- Yu Chengxi as Li Jun
- Zhao Shuai as Ruan Xiaoer
- Liu Ke as Zhang Heng
- Liu Difei as Ruan Xiaowu
- Wei Binghua as Zhang Shun
- Zhang Haoxiang as Ruan Xiaoqi
- Na Zhidong as Yang Xiong
- Liu Guanxiang as Shi Xiu
- Zhang Zichen as Xie Zhen
- Du Peng as Xie Bao
- Yan Kuan as Yan Qing
- Chen Cheng as Zhu Wu
- Na Jiawei as Huang Xin
- Yang Yi as Sun Li
- Pan Ge as Xuan Zan
- Sun Donghao as Hao Siwen
- Duan Yang as Han Tao
- Chen Songtao as Peng Qi
- Zhu Jie as Shan Tinggui
- Jiang Xiaomeng as Wei Dingguo
- Bai Zhicheng as Xiao Rang
- Ji Qiansong as Pei Xuan
- Zhang Chong as Ou Peng
- Deng Fei as Deng Fei
- Wumaierjiang as Yan Shun
- Xia Tian as Yang Lin
- Geng Yi as Ling Zhen
- Tian Ye as Jiang Jing
- Sun Boyang as Lü Fang
- Yang Yang as Guo Sheng
- Chen Dacheng as An Daoquan
- Tian Wentao as Huangfu Duan
- Wang Chunyuan as Wang Ying
- Liu Xiaoxiao as Hu Sanniang
- Yang Bin as Bao Xu
- Liu Zhangyin as Fan Rui
- Wang Zengqi as Kong Ming
- Liu Liang as Kong Liang
- Ying Jun as Xiang Chong
- Zhou Mingyang as Li Gun
- Guo Xiao'an as Jin Dajian
- Zhang Chi as Ma Lin
- Hong Yiping as Tong Wei
- Hu Meng as Tong Meng
- Sun Jiandong as Meng Kang
- Li Haishan as Hou Jian
- Zhang Xiaomin as Chen Da
- Peng Hongyu as Yang Chun
- Gao Hai as Zheng Tianshou
- Sun Fuli as Tao Zongwang
- Li Xiaolong as Song Qing
- He Xianwei as Yue He
- Dong Hai as Gong Wang
- Zi Liang as Ding Desun
- Liu Bo as Mu Chun
- Liu Yulong as Cao Zheng
- Guo Bo as Song Wan
- Gao Zhao as Du Qian
- Li Shu as Xue Yong
- Liu Zihe as Shi En
- Li Yonglin as Li Zhong
- Xie Zhang as Zhou Tong
- Liu Yong as Tang Long
- Qiu Feng as Du Xing
- Wu Kegang as Zou Yuan
- Wang Fei as Zou Run
- Yuan Min as Zhu Fu
- Li Shengyu as Zhu Gui
- Li Guoping as Cai Fu
- Zheng Xilong as Cai Qing
- Lü Yuantian as Li Li
- Ge Min as Li Yun
- Kou Jun as Jiao Ting
- Li Haidong as Shi Yong
- Zhang Jinhe as Sun Xin
- Hu Ke as Gu Dasao
- Mao Zhu as Zhang Qing
- He Jiayi as Sun Erniang
- Cui Yang as Wang Dingliu
- Ge Zi as Yu Baosi
- Liu Guanlin as Bai Sheng
- Liu Fengchao as Shi Qian
- Chen Lianghao as Duan Jingzhu

=== Others ===
- Yang Zi as Emperor Huizong
- Ady An as Li Shishi
- Xue Zhongrui as Cai Jing
- Zhou Mingcan as Tong Guan
- Waise Lee as Gao Qiu
- Tong Dawei as Su Dongpo
- Anita Yuen as Lin Chong's wife
- Yang Niansheng as Su Yuanjing
- Jin Ke as Chen Wanshan
- Zhang Tielin as Hong Xin
- Liu Xiao Ling Tong as Squire Kong
- Qi Huai as Wen Da
- Wang Xinran as Fu'an
- Yin Fuwen as Shi Wenbin
- He Shengwei as Liang Shijie
- Zhao Yiyang as Gao Yanei
- Song Dong as Lu Qian
- Liu Bingfeng as "Yuhou" Li
- Wang Yiwei as Zhang Ganban
- Wang Jianguo as Wang Jin
- Li Haohan as Wang Lun
- Sun Lihua as Cheng Wan'er
- Du Chun as Ximen Qing
- Gan Tingting as Pan Jinlian
- Qiang Long as Wu Dalang
- Hu Guangzi as Zhang Wenyuan
- Xie Ning as Butcher Zheng
- Han Dong as Jiang the Door God
- Ji Chunhua as Luan Tingyu
- Xu Xiangdong as Shi Wengong
- Jiang Shouzhi as Ye Qing
- Ma Zijun as Elder Zhizhen / Zhou Tong
- Yang Yongjie as Zeng Tu
- Wang Yanming as Zeng Mi
- Xu Shuo as Zeng Suo
- Yin Hailong as Zeng Kui
- Chen Guoliang as Zeng Sheng
- Wang Duhao as Cui Daocheng
- Gao Quanjun as Qiu Xiaoyi
- Wu Qingzhe as Fang La
- Ren Xihong as Pang Wanchun
- Meng Yao as Pan Qiaoyun
- Fu Lei as Zhu Biao
- Xie Xian as Yulan
- Wang Mian as Ying'er
- Bi Xiuru as Yan Po
- Xiong Naijin as Yan Xijiao
- Huang Yingxuan as Qiongying
- Ding Zishuo as Jin Cuilian
- Xu Wanqiu as Li Ruilan
- Wang Zixuan as Lu Jinzhi
- Wang Wenting as Bai Xiuying
- Chen Lili as Madam Jia
- Ma Youxi as Madam Cui
- Yi Dan as Liu Gao's wife
- Ge Siran as Liu Jinniang
- Yang Qing as Granny Wang
- Wang Yining as Xu Ning's wife
- Li Wenzhen as Granny Li
- Xiao Yuyu as Yue'er
- Liu Meilin as Jin'er
- Qi Xunfei as Chunxiang
- Hai Bo as Immortal Zhang
- Li Xi'er as Li Qiaonu
- Ren Yuan as Shi Bao

== Soundtrack ==
All Men Are Brothers Television Original Soundtrack (新水浒传电视原声带)

Soundtrack album by Zhou Zhiyong
- Released: August 16, 2011
- Label: Mobile Fidelity Sound Lab; Longyue Wenhua

The music for the series was composed by Zhou Zhiyong (周志勇).

=== Track list ===
#	Track title	Artist	Notes
1	"Four Seas" 四海	Coco Lee	Ending theme song of the Taiwanese release
2	"After You Left" 自从你走后	Chu Rui	Ending theme song
3	"Wine and Beauty" 醉红颜	Liu Yiduo	
4	"Countless Brothers" 兄弟无数	Jing Gangshan	Opening theme song
5	"Oath of the Four Seas" 四海盟约	Mao Amin	Ending theme song
6	"Melodies of the Qin" 琴韵	Zhao Xiaoxia	
7	"List of Mountains" 群山谱	Chu Rui	
8	"Deep Emotions Theme" 大情感主题	China National Symphony Orchestra	
9	"Heroes' Feelings" 英雄之情怀	Song Fei	
10	"Chivalrous Passion" 侠情	China National Symphony Orchestra	
11	"Homeland" 乡土	Gao Guanlin (sanxian) / Niu Changhong (banhu)	
12	"Liangshan Marsh" 水泊梁山	Sun Hao / He Jiayi / Ding Guagua	
13	"Tunes from Lu" 鲁腔	China National Symphony Orchestra	
14	"Heroes Shed Tears Too" 英雄也有泪	China National Symphony Orchestra	
15	"Heroes Endure Humiliation But Do Not Yield" 英雄之忍辱而不屈	China National Symphony Orchestra	
16	"After You Left" 自从你走后	Hu Dong	Ending theme song
17	"Men's Arms and Shoulders" 男人的臂膀	Liu Yunzhi (violin) / Song Fei (dihu)	
18	"Safety in a Dangerous Situation" 绝地重生	China National Symphony Orchestra	

=== Hong Kong release ===
The Hong Kong release features a different opening and ending theme song from the original version. Both are sung in Cantonese.

#	Track title	Artist	Notes
1	"Walk Heaven's Path Together" 天道同行	Hubert Wu	Opening theme song
2	"Drifting Blossoms" 飘花	Hubert Wu	Ending theme song

== Broadcasts ==
Region	Network	Dates	Timings
Hong Kong	High Definition Jade	4 May 2011	23:45 - 00:45 on weekdays
Taiwan	China Television	25 July 2011	20:00 - 22:00 on weekdays
Taiwan	NTV Variety	29 August 2011	20:00 - 21:00 on weekdays
Mainland China	Anhui Satellite Channel	2 August - 10 September 2011	19:31 - 21:16 daily
Mainland China	Tianjin Satellite Channel	2 August - 10 September 2011	19:30 - 21:15 daily
Mainland China	Shandong Satellite Channel	2 August - 10 September 2011	19:31 - 21:15 daily
Mainland China	Dragon Television	2 August - 10 September 2011	19:31 - 21:12 daily

=== Re-broadcasts ===
Region	Network	Dates	Timings
Mainland China	Tianjin Satellite Channel	12 September 2011	19:30 - 21:15 daily
Mainland China	Shandong Satellite Channel	12 September 2011	19:31 - 21:15 daily
Mainland China	Dragon Television	12 September 2011	19:31 - 21:12 daily

== Production ==
Wu Ziniu was initially directing the series, but had switched to work on Great Porcelain Merchant as the shooting of All Men Are Brothers was delayed. He was replaced by Hong Kong television series director Kuk Kwok-leung. Art director Zheng Xiaolong said that he felt that Wu would be more suitable as the director, but he also expressed confidence in Kuk.

There were rumours that Fan Bingbing would be portraying Pan Jinlian. However, during the opening ceremony, Fan's spokesperson denied those claims and accused the production team of using Fan's name as a means of advertising the series. She added that Fan will only participate in projects her own company is involved in. Zheng Shuang, who played Hu Sanniang in The Water Margin (1997), also expressed interest in taking on the (more challenging) role of Pan Jinlian. However, Gan Tingting was eventually cast as Pan Jinlian.

Photos of actor Wu Yue dressed in ancient Chinese armour and posing in various martial arts stances appeared on the internet around late 2009. There were rumours about the photos being a preview to Lin Chong's character design in the upcoming All Men Are Brothers. Wu's spokesperson claimed that Wu did not receive an official invitation from the production team of All Men Are Brothers to join the project, although he did interact with them. The photos are actually part of a wuxia-themed series of pictures used to promote the 2008 Summer Olympics.

There were rumours that Deng Chao, Nie Yuan, Tong Dawei and Huang Xiaoming are part of the cast. Huang, who was initially a popular choice for the role of Yan Qing, claimed that he did not receive any notice and is unable to join the project due to his schedule. Deng was considered by Wu Ziniu for playing Song Jiang. Nie was initially confirmed to portray Lin Chong, but an online poll found that Nie ranked behind another actor, Yu Bo (于波), in terms of popularity for playing Lin Chong, even though the poll was not a factor in determining which actor would be cast. Both Nie and Deng had expressed interest in taking on the role of Ximen Qing.

== Awards and nominations ==
Year	Award	Category	Nominee	Result
2011	3rd China TV Drama Awards	Best Television Series		Won
2011	3rd China TV Drama Awards	Best Character	Zhang Hanyu	Won
2011	3rd China TV Drama Awards	Best New Actress	Bobo Gan	Won
2011	3rd China TV Drama Awards	Best Original Soundtrack	Jing Gangshan	Won

== See also ==
- The Water Margin (film)
- The Water Margin (1973 TV series)
- Outlaws of the Marsh (TV series)
- The Water Margin (1998 TV series)
