= All Men Are Brothers (film) =

1975 Hong Kong film by Chang Cheh and Wu Ma

- Film poster
- 蕩寇誌
- Directed by: Chang Cheh; Wu Ma
- Screenplay by: Chang Cheh; Ni Kuang
- Based on: Water Margin by Shi Nai'an
- Produced by: Runme Shaw
- Starring: David Chiang; Ti Lung; Chen Kuan-tai; Wong Chung; Danny Lee; Bolo Yeung; Ku Feng; Tetsuro Tamba; Fan Mei-sheng; Wong Kwong-yue
- Cinematography: Kuang Han-lu
- Edited by: Kwok Ting-hung
- Music by: Frankie Chan
- Production company: Shaw Brothers Studio
- Distributed by: Shaw Brothers Studio
- Release date: 10 May 1975
- Running time: 101 minutes
- Country: Hong Kong
- Language: Mandarin

All Men Are Brothers (蕩寇誌), also known as Seven Soldiers of Kung Fu, is a 1975 Hong Kong wuxia film adapted from the 14th-century classical novel Water Margin, focusing on the Liangshan outlaws' campaign against Fang La's forces after they have been granted amnesty. The film was produced by the Shaw Brothers Studio and directed by Chang Cheh and Wu Ma.

== Synopsis ==
The 108 Stars of Destiny at Liangshan have been granted amnesty by Emperor Huizong due to the efforts of Yan Qing and Li Shishi. The emperor sends them to attack Fang La, a rebel leader in southern China whose forces rival that of the Liangshan outlaws. Although the Liangshan forces eventually defeat and capture Fang La, they also sustain heavy losses and many of their heroes are killed during the campaign.

== Cast ==
- David Chiang as Yan Qing
- Fan Mei-sheng as Li Kui
- Chen Kuan-tai as Shi Jin
- Wong Chung as Shi Xiu
- Danny Lee as Zhang Shun
- Wang Kuang-yu as Zhang Qing
- Yue Fung as Sun Erniang
- Ti Lung as Wu Song
- Zhu Mu as Fang La
- Tin Ching as Fang Tianding
- Tung Lam as Yuan Shang
- Jin Bong-jin as Shi Bao
- Bolo Yeung as Si Xingfang
- Lau Gong as Li Tianrun
- Wong Ching as General Lu
- Zhang Yang as Emperor Huizong of Song
- Betty Chung as Li Shishi
- Ku Feng as Song Jiang
- Tetsuro Tamba as Lu Junyi
- Chin Feng as Wu Yong
- Chen Wo-fu as Xu Ning
- Michael Chan as Dong Ping
- Lau Dan as Lei Heng
- Lei Lung as Qin Ming
- Chang Wing-gai as Xie Bao
- Lee Wai-hoi as Xie Zhen
- Wu Chi-chin as Yang Xiong
- Leung Seung-wan as Liu Tang
- Lee Yung-git as Ruan Xiaoer
- Bruce Tong as Ruan Xiaowu
- Wai Gong-sang as Ruan Xiaoqi
- Yueh Hua as Lin Chong
- Lily Ho as Hu Sanniang
- Cheng Lui as Wang Ying
- Yeung Chak-lam as Cai Qing
- Paul Chun as Hua Rong
- Pang Pang as Lu Zhishen
- Ho Hon-chau as Chang Meng
- Lo Wai as Zhou Tong
- Lee Hang as Dai Zong
- Woo Wai as Cai Fu
