= Guo Sheng =

Fictional character in the Chinese classical novel Water Margin

- Water Margin character
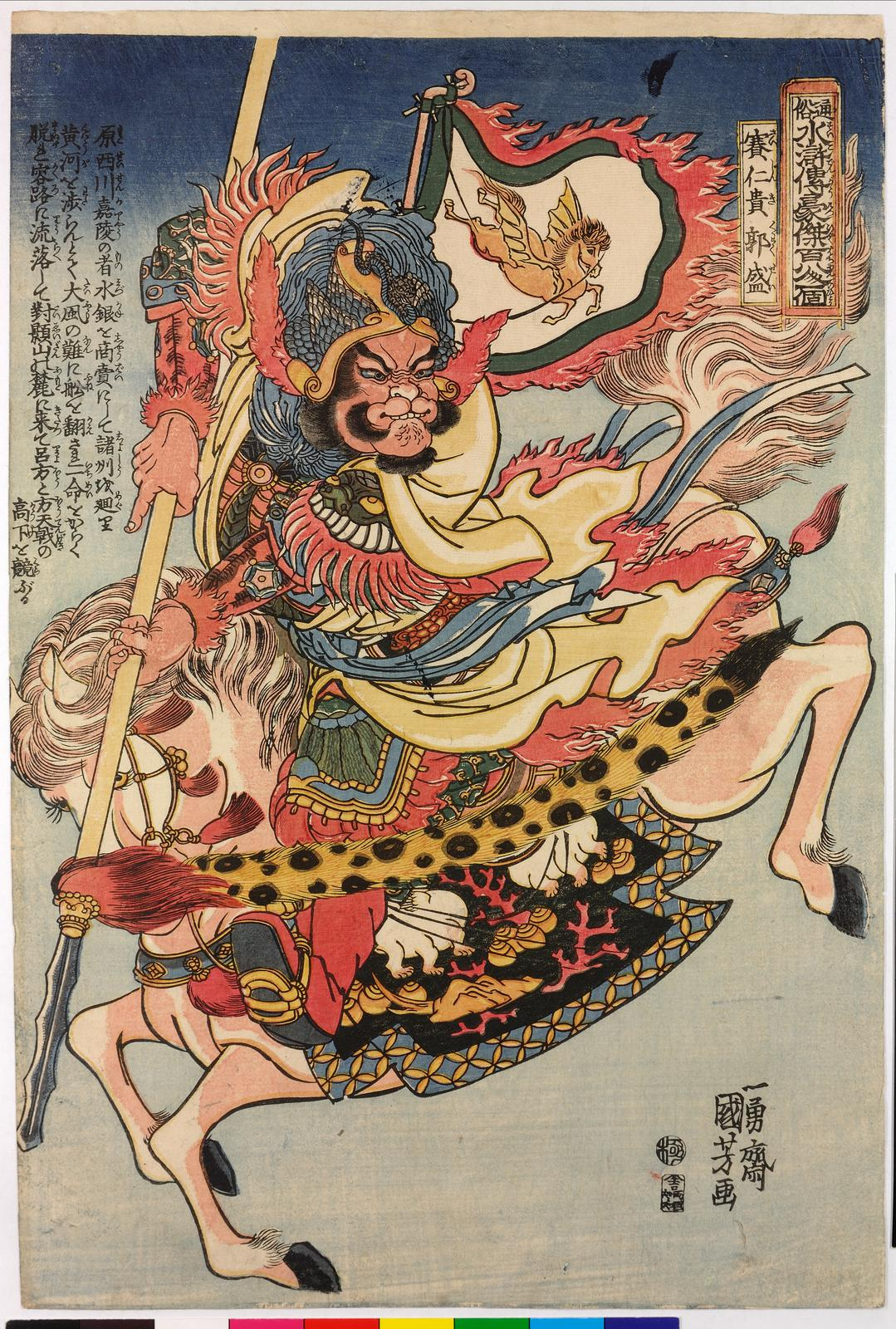
- an illustration of Guo Sheng by Utagawa Kuniyoshi
- First appearance: Chapter 35

In-universe information
- Nickname: "Comparable to Rengui" 賽仁貴
- Weapon: "Sky Piercer" (方天畫戟)
- Origin: outlaw
- Designation: Central Camp Guardian of Liangshan
- Rank: 55th, Help Star (地祐星) of the 72 Earthly Fiends
- Ancestral home / Place of origin: Jialing (present-day Jialing District, Nanchong, Sichuan)

Chinese names
- Simplified Chinese: 郭盛
- Traditional Chinese: 郭盛
- Pinyin: Guō Shèng
- Wade–Giles: Kuo Sheng

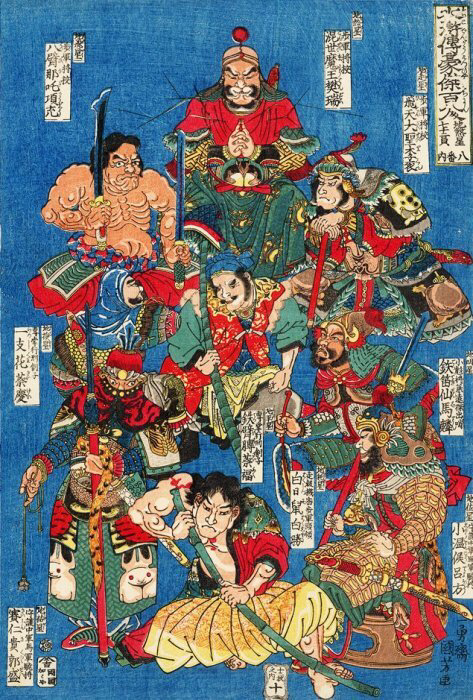
An illustration of nine of the 108 Heroes by Utagawa Kuniyoshi. Cai Fu is in the centre. The rest are (clockwise from top): Fan Rui, Li Gun, Ma Lin, Lü Fang, Bai Sheng, Guo Sheng, Cai Qing, and Xiang Chong.

Guo Sheng is a fictional character in Water Margin, one of the Classic Chinese Novels. Nicknamed "Comparable to Rengui", he ranks 55th among the 108 Heroes and 19th among the 72 Earthly Fiends.

== Background ==
The novel describes Guo Sheng as a warrior dressed in a suit of silvery white armour over a white robe tied by a silver belt. In battle, he rides a white horse and wields a fangtian ji similar to the one used by the Han dynasty warrior Lü Bu. He is nicknamed "Comparable to Rengui" after the Tang dynasty general Xue Rengui, who is also known for using a ji in battle.

Originally a mercury seller from Jialing (嘉陵; present-day Jialing District, Nanchong, Sichuan), Guo Sheng becomes an outlaw after losing all his goods in the river during a storm and being unable to afford his journey home.

== Duel with Lü Fang ==
One day, Guo Sheng hears of Lü Fang, a warrior who also wields a fangtian ji and has defeated many challengers at Shadow-Facing Hill (對影山). He then travels to Shadow-Facing Hill to challenge Lü Fang to determine who is more worthy of using the weapon. As neither of them can overcome his opponent, their duel continues day after day.

Meanwhile, a group of outlaws led by Song Jiang, Hua Rong, and others are on their way to join the outlaw band at Liangshan Marsh after defeating government forces in Qingzhou (青州; in present-day Shandong). They pass by Shadow-Facing Hill and come across the duel between the warriors. At that moment, the tassels of Guo Sheng and Lü Fang's fangtian jis have gotten tangled, and the two are struggling to free their weapons. Hua Rong fires an arrow which hits exactly the tangled spot and separates the weapons, drawing cheers from everyone watching. Guo Sheng and Lü Fang stop their duel and introduce themselves to the group. Upon learning that the group is on its way to Liangshan, the two warriors request to join them and eventually become part of the Liangshan outlaw band.

== Campaigns and death ==
After the 108 Heroes are fully assembled, Guo Sheng and Lü Fang are appointed as guardians of the central camp to oversee the protection of the commanders whenever Liangshan forces go to battle. Guo Sheng participates in the campaigns against the Liao invaders and rebel forces in Song territory after the outlaws receive amnesty from Emperor Huizong.

During the final campaign against Fang La's rebel forces, Guo Sheng is assigned to attack Black Dragon Ridge (烏龍嶺; northeast of present-day Meicheng Town, Jiande, Zhejiang). While leading a charge up the ridge, he is crushed to death by boulders rolled down by the enemy.

== In other media ==
In the wuxia novel The Legend of the Condor Heroes by Jin Yong, the protagonist Guo Jing is a descendant of Guo Sheng.
