= Ma Lin (Water Margin) =

Fictional character in the Chinese classical novel Water Margin

- Water Margin character
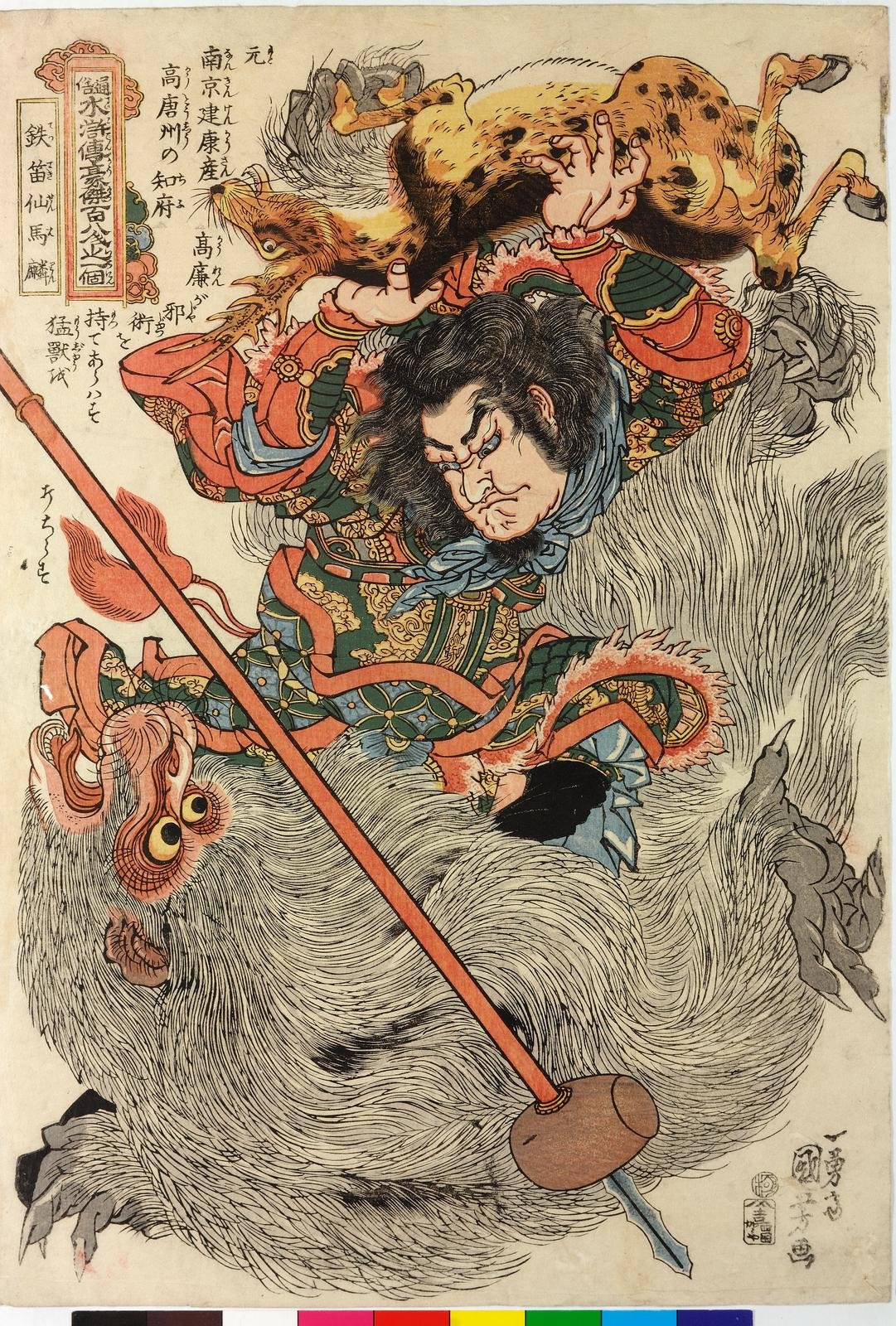
- an illustration of Ma Lin by Utagawa Kuniyoshi
- First appearance: Chapter 41

In-universe information
- Nickname: "Iron Flute Deity" 鐵笛仙
- Weapon: pair of sabres
- Origin: outlaw
- Designation: Tiger Cub Patrol Commander of Liangshan
- Rank: 67th, Bright Star (地明星) of the 72 Earthly Fiends
- Ancestral home / Place of origin: Jiankang Prefecture (present-day Nanjing, Jiangsu)

Chinese names
- Simplified Chinese: 马麟
- Traditional Chinese: 馬麟
- Pinyin: Mǎ Lín
- Wade–Giles: Ma Lin

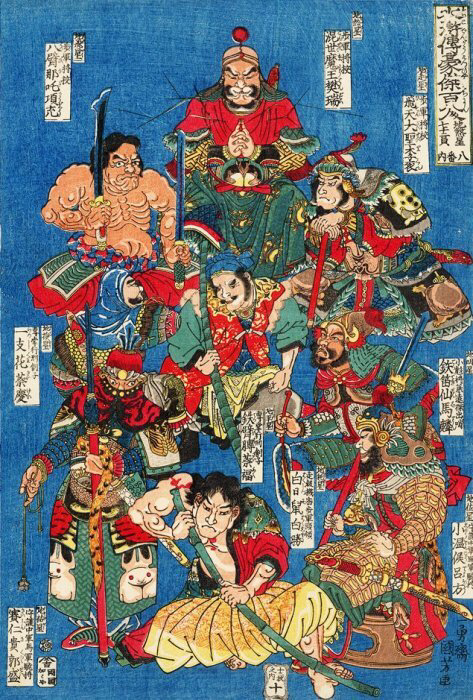
An illustration of nine of the 108 Heroes by Utagawa Kuniyoshi. Cai Fu is in the centre. The rest are (clockwise from top): Fan Rui, Li Gun, Ma Lin, Lü Fang, Bai Sheng, Guo Sheng, Cai Qing, and Xiang Chong.

Ma Lin is a fictional character in Water Margin, one of the Classic Chinese Novels. Nicknamed "Iron Flute Deity", he ranks 67th among the 108 Heroes and 31st among the 72 Earthly Fiends.

== Background ==
Originally from Jiankang Prefecture (present-day Nanjing, Jiangsu), Ma Lin is a highly-skilled fighter who specialises in using a pair of bronze sabres. He is also known for his expertise in playing the dizi (Chinese flute), which earns him the nickname "Iron Flute Deity".

== Joining Liangshan ==
Ma Lin is first introduced in the novel as one of four leaders of an outlaw group at Yellow Gate Hill (黃門山; in present-day She County, Anhui) along with Ou Peng, Tao Zongwang, and Jiang Jing.

When Song Jiang is following the outlaws of Liangshan Marsh back to their stronghold after they rescued him at Jiangzhou (江州; present-day Jiujiang, Jiangxi), they pass by Yellow Gate Hill. Ma Lin and the other three leaders stop the group and ask to speak to Song Jiang, whom they have heard of and admire, and request to join Liangshan. Song Jiang agrees and takes the Yellow Gate Hill outlaws with him to Liangshan.

When the Liangshan outlaws are attacking the Zhu Family Village, Ma Lin engages Hu Sanniang, then an ally of the Zhus, in a duel on horseback, and earns Song Jiang's praise for his fighting skills.

== Campaigns and death ==
Ma Lin is appointed as a Tiger Cub Patrol Commander of the Liangshan cavalry after all the 108 Heroes are fully assembled. He participates in the campaigns against the Liao invaders and rebel forces in Song territory after the outlaws receive amnesty from Emperor Huizong.

During the final campaign against Fang La's rebel forces, Ma Lin is assigned to attack Black Dragon Ridge (烏龍嶺; northeast of present-day Meicheng Town, Jiande, Zhejiang). He is knocked off horseback while fighting with Bai Qin, and gets sliced in two by Shi Bao before he can get back on his feet.
