= Gongsun Sheng =

Fictional character in the Chinese classical novel Water Margin

- Water Margin character
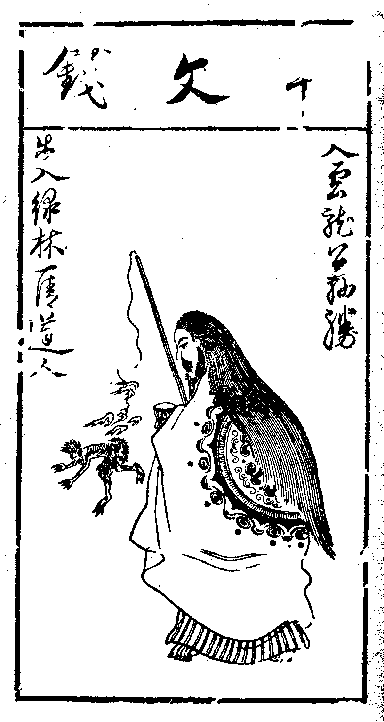
- an illustration of Gongsun Sheng by Chen Hongshou
- First appearance: Chapter 14

In-universe information
- Nicknames: "Dragon in the Clouds" 入雲龍
- Weapon: ancient copper sword
- Origin: Taoist
- Designation: Strategist of Liangshan
- Rank: 4th, Leisure Star (天閒星) of the 36 Heavenly Spirits
- Ancestral home / Place of origin: Jizhou (present-day Ji County, Tianjin)

Chinese names
- Simplified Chinese: 公孙胜
- Traditional Chinese: 公孫勝
- Pinyin: Gōngsūn Shèng
- Wade–Giles: Kung-sun Sheng

Gongsun Sheng is a fictional character in Water Margin, one of the Classic Chinese Novels. Nicknamed "Dragon in the Clouds", he ranks fourth among the 36 Heavenly Spirits, the first third of the 108 Heroes.

== Background ==
The novel describes Gongsun Sheng as an eight chi tall Taoist priest with a noble appearance. His eyebrows part like the Chinese character for "eight" (八) and his eyes are almond-shaped. Hailing from Jizhou (薊州; present-day Ji County, Tianjin), he is well-versed in Taoist sorcery, capable of summoning the wind and rain, riding the mist, and driving the clouds. His magical powers and mysterious behaviour earn him the nickname "Dragon in the Clouds". He also wields an ancient copper sword, which he uses for casting spells.

== Robbing the convoy of birthday gifts ==
Gongsun Sheng learns that Liang Shijie, the prefect of Daming Prefecture, is sending valuables to his father-in-law, the corrupt official Cai Jing, as birthday gifts. He rushes to Dongxi Village in Yuncheng County to ask Chao Gai, the village's headman famed for chivalry, to partner him in robbing the convoy. By then, Chao Gai has already gathered Wu Yong, Liu Tang and the Ruan brothers (Ruan Xiaoer, Ruan Xiaowu and Ruan Xiaoqi) for the heist. After Gongsun Sheng makes a row outside the house when he is denied entry, Chao Gai comes out to welcome him and ropes him into the group upon learning that he shares the same views as them.

Following Wu Yong's plan, the seven men disguise themselves as jujube traders and trick the convoy's escorts, led by Yang Zhi, into consuming an alcoholic drink spiked by Bai Sheng with menghanyao (蒙汗藥), a drug that will make the consumer dizzy and lose consciousness. Once Yang Zhi and the escorts are out cold, Gongsun Sheng and the other six rob the valuables and make off with them.

The authorities later determine that Chao Gai is behind the heist so they send soldiers to arrest him. However, Chao Gai and his friends have been forewarned by the magistrate's clerk Song Jiang, so they have already escaped to the fishing village where the Ruan brothers live. Wu Yong sets up a plan to lure the soldiers into the marsh, while Gongsun Sheng uses his magic to manipulate the weather and confuse them, allowing the others to defeat the soldiers. After that, the seven men head to the outlaw stronghold at Liangshan Marsh and take refuge there.

At Liangshan, Chao Gai replaces Wang Lun as chief of the outlaw band after Lin Chong kills Wang Lun.

== As an outlaw ==
After some time at Liangshan, Gongsun Sheng misses his mother, who lives alone, so he returns to Jizhou to visit her. He ends up staying there longer than expected as he continues practising Taoism under the tutelage of his master, Taoist Luo.

Meanwhile, the Liangshan outlaws are attacking Gaotangzhou (高唐州; around present-day Gaotang County, Shandong) in an attempt to free their ally Chai Jin, a nobleman who has been imprisoned by Gaotangzhou's corrupt governor Gao Lian. Although Gaotangzhou's forces are no match for Liangshan, the latter cannot breach the city's defences as Gao Lian, who is trained in black magic, conjures wild beasts to throw the outlaws into disarray. The Liangshan commander Song Jiang then sends Dai Zong and Li Kui to Jizhou to find Gongsun Sheng to help them.

In Jizhou, Taoist Luo refuses to allow Gongsun Sheng to leave with Dai Zong and Li Kui. Exasperated, Li sneaks into the sanctum at night and kills Luo. The next day, he is shocked to see that Luo is alive and well. Luo punishes Li for his impudence by summoning a divine guardian to capture him and drop him off in Suzhou's administrative office, where Li is mistaken for a demon and gets beaten up and thrown into prison.

Taoist Luo ultimately saves Li Kui and allows Gongsun Sheng to leave with Dai Zong and Li Kui on the condition that his apprentice must return to complete his training. Upon arriving at Gaotangzhou, Gongsun uses his sorcery to counter Gao Lian's dark magic, allowing the outlaws to break through and rescue Chai Jin.

Later, the Liangshan outlaws face a challenge from another outlaw band at Mount Mangdang (芒碭山; north of present-day Yongcheng, Henan) led by Fan Rui, Xiang Chong and Li Gun. Xiang Chong and Li Gun initially defeat and capture Shi Jin, who is leading the Liangshan vanguard. After the main Liangshan force arrives, Gongsun Sheng arranges the troops in a formation and traps Xiang Chong and Li Gun when they rush into it. Fan Rui, who is also skilled in Taoist sorcery, is unable to save his lieutenants, who are captured by the Liangshan outlaws. Song Jiang treats Xiang Chong and Li Gun respectfully and manages to convince them to join Liangshan; in return, they persuade Fan Rui to surrender and join Liangshan as well. Gongsun Sheng also takes Fan Rui as his apprentice to help him hone his sorcery skills.

== Campaigns ==
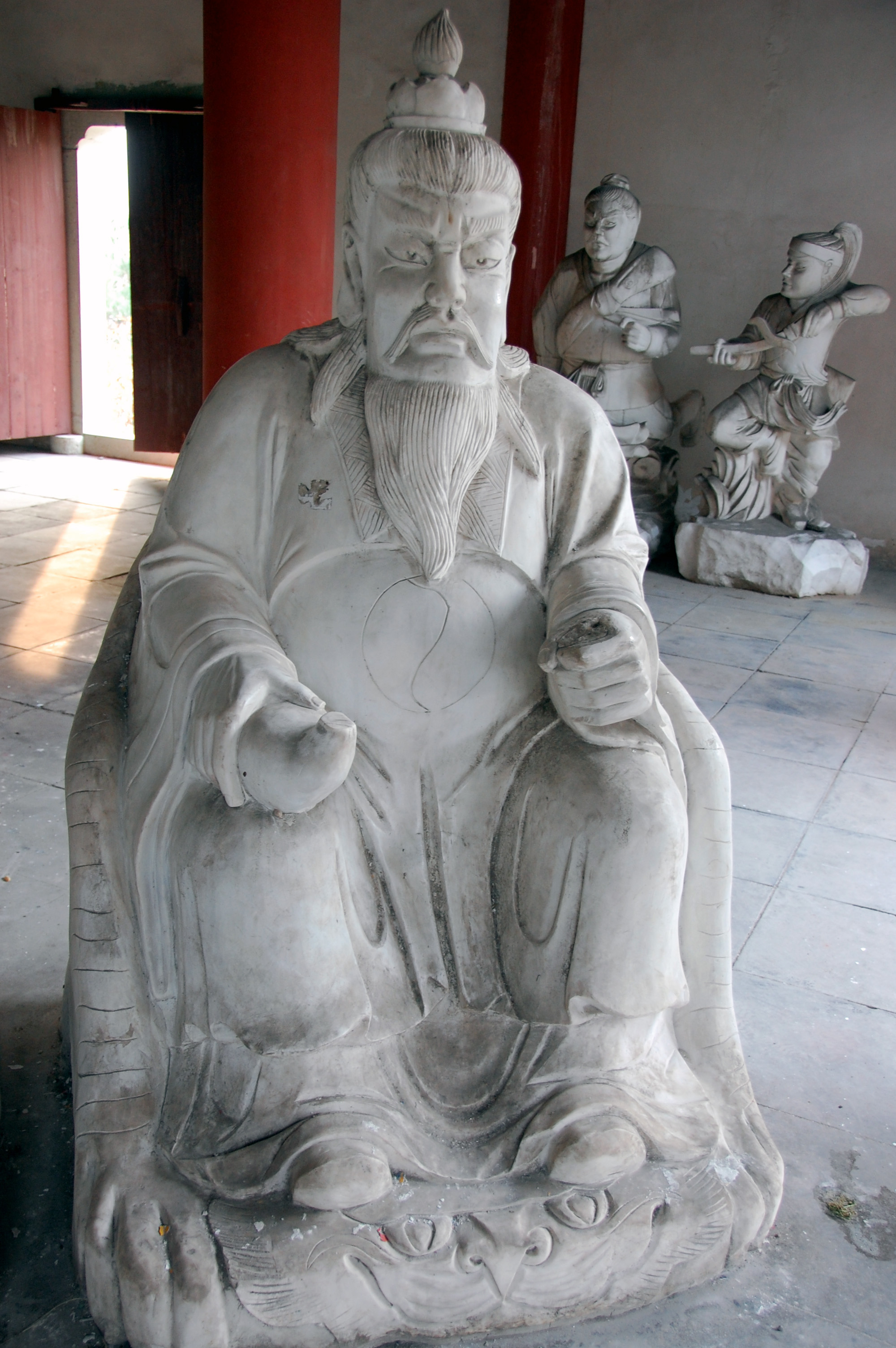
A stone statue of Gongsun Sheng at the Hengdian World Studios.

Gongsun Sheng is appointed as a chief strategist of Liangshan alongside Wu Yong after the 108 Heroes are fully assembled. He participates in the campaigns against the Liao invaders and other rebel forces in Song territory after the outlaws receive amnesty from Emperor Huizong.

During the campaign against the rebel leader Tian Hu, Gongsun Sheng defeats Qiao Daoqing, a sorcerer serving under Tian, and aids the Liangshan forces in overcoming Tian's forces. He does not participate in the final campaign against the rebel leader Fang La, and instead returns to Jizhou to continue his training under Taoist Luo's instruction as he has promised.
