= Bai Sheng =

Fictional character in the Chinese classical novel Water Margin

- Water Margin character
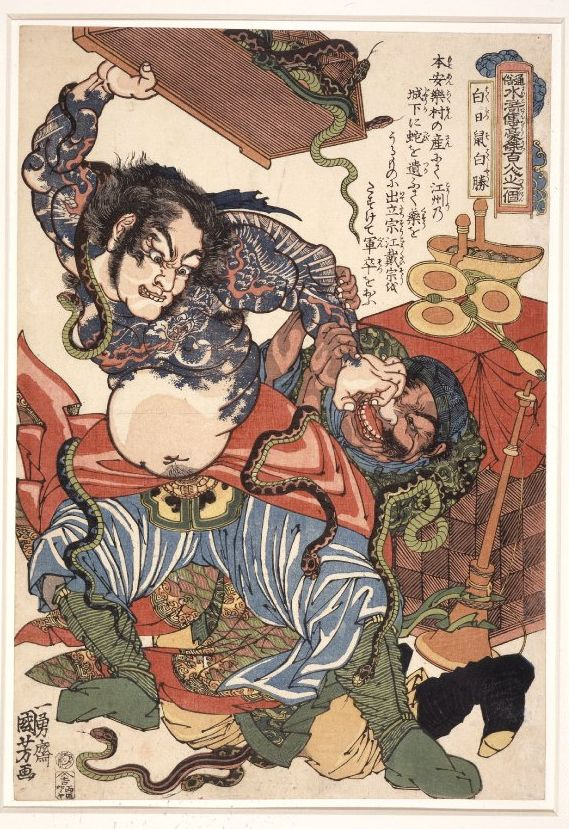
- an illustration of Bai Sheng by Utagawa Kuniyoshi
- First appearance: Chapter 16

In-universe information
- Nickname: "Daylight Rat" 白日鼠
- Origin: gambler
- Designation: Infantry Commander of Liangshan
- Rank: 106th, Rat Star (地耗星) of the 72 Earthly Fiends
- Ancestral home / Place of origin: Anle Village, Yuncheng County, Shandong

Chinese names
- Simplified Chinese: 白胜
- Traditional Chinese: 白勝
- Pinyin: Bái Shèng
- Wade–Giles: Pai Sheng

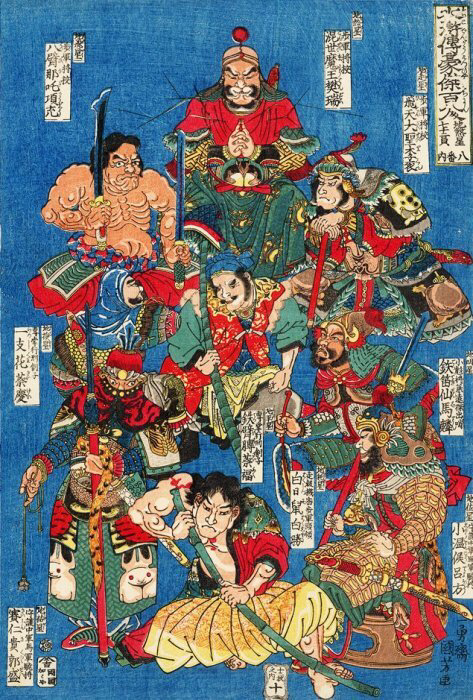
An illustration of nine of the 108 Heroes by Utagawa Kuniyoshi. Cai Fu is in the centre. The rest are (clockwise from top): Fan Rui, Li Gun, Ma Lin, Lü Fang, Bai Sheng, Guo Sheng, Cai Qing, and Xiang Chong.

Bai Sheng is a fictional character in Water Margin, one of the Classic Chinese Novels. Nicknamed "Daylight Rat", he ranks 106th among the 108 Heroes and 70th among the 72 Earthly Fiends.

== Background ==
Originally from Anle Village (安樂村) in Yuncheng County, Bai Sheng is nicknamed "Daylight Rat" because he is an idler who lacks a stable job and spends most of his time gambling. He is an acquaintance of Chao Gai, the headman of Dongxi Village in Yuncheng County, whom he has received help from.

== Robbing the convoy of birthday gifts ==
When news reaches Yuncheng County that a convoy of valuables – meant as birthday gifts for the corrupt official Cai Jing – is on its way to the capital Dongjing (東京; present-day Kaifeng, Henan), Chao Gai forms a team with six others – Wu Yong, Gongsun Sheng, Liu Tang, Ruan Xiao'er, Ruan Xiaowu, and Ruan Xiaoqi – to rob the convoy. Wu Yong plans the heist, which will take place at Yellow Mud Ridge (黃泥岡) in the southeast of Yuncheng County near Anle Village, and enlists the help of Bai Sheng.

The seven men disguise themselves as jujube traders and find the convoy, which is led by Yang Zhi, resting under the trees on a hot day. During this time, Bai Sheng pretends to pass by, selling two buckets of an alcoholic drink – one of which is secretly spiked with menghanyao (蒙汗藥), a drug that causes dizziness and unconsciousness. At first, Yang Zhi feels suspicious and refuses to allow his men to buy the drink to quench their thirst. However, they soon lower their guard after seeing that the jujube traders are fine after drinking from one bucket, so they buy the second bucket and drink from it. Bai Sheng then leaves with the two empty buckets.

Shortly after that, Yang Zhi and his men feel dizzy and gradually lose consciousness. Once they are out cold, the seven men steal the valuables and make off with them. Bai Sheng later also receives his share of the loot.

== Becoming an outlaw ==
Liang Shijie, Cai Jing's son-in-law and the governor of Daming Prefecture (大名府; present-day Daming County, Hebei) who had prepared the birthday gifts for his father-in-law, is furious when he learns of the heist, so he orders the local authorities to investigate and arrest the robbers. The Jizhou government, which oversees Yuncheng County, assigns the law enforcement officer He Tao to the case.

He Qing, He Tao's brother, had seen the seven men at a tavern near Yellow Mud Ridge on the day of the heist, and had recognised one of them as Chao Gai, the headman of Dongxi Village. Later that day, he had also seen Bai Sheng carrying two buckets of an alcoholic drink, and had found it odd. He shares the information with his brother, who immediately leads his men to Bai Sheng's house. While searching the house, they discover Bai Sheng's share of the loot buried in the ground under his bed. They arrest and torture him to force him to identify the seven robbers. Although he initially denies his involvement in the heist and insists he does not know any of them, he ultimately breaks under torture, and names Chao Gai, whom the authorities already know is one of the robbers.

Song Jiang, a clerk serving under Yuncheng County's magistrate, hears from He Tao that he has identified Chao Gai as one of the robbers. Unknown to He Tao, he is a friend of Chao Gai, so he secretly rushes to Chao's house to warn him and the other six men that the authorities are on their way to arrest them. Chao Gai and his six companions manage to flee and take shelter in the outlaw stronghold at Liangshan Marsh, where Chao eventually becomes the outlaw band's chief.

With the outlaws' covert assistance, Bai Sheng ultimately escapes from prison and takes his wife with him to Liangshan to join the outlaws.

== Campaigns and death ==
Bai Sheng is appointed as a commander of the Liangshan infantry after the 108 Heroes are fully assembled. His task is to deliver intelligence reports to and fro the frontline.

After Emperor Huizong grants amnesty to the Liangshan outlaws, Bai Sheng joins them in the campaigns against the Liao invaders and rebel forces in Song territory. During the final campaign against Fang La's rebel forces, Bai Sheng falls sick and dies of illness shortly after the battle of Hangzhou. After the campaign is over, the emperor awards him the posthumous title "Righteous Gentleman of Integrity" (義節郎) to honour him for his contributions during the campaigns.
