= Xiang Chong (Water Margin) =

Fictional character in the Chinese classical novel Water Margin

- Water Margin character
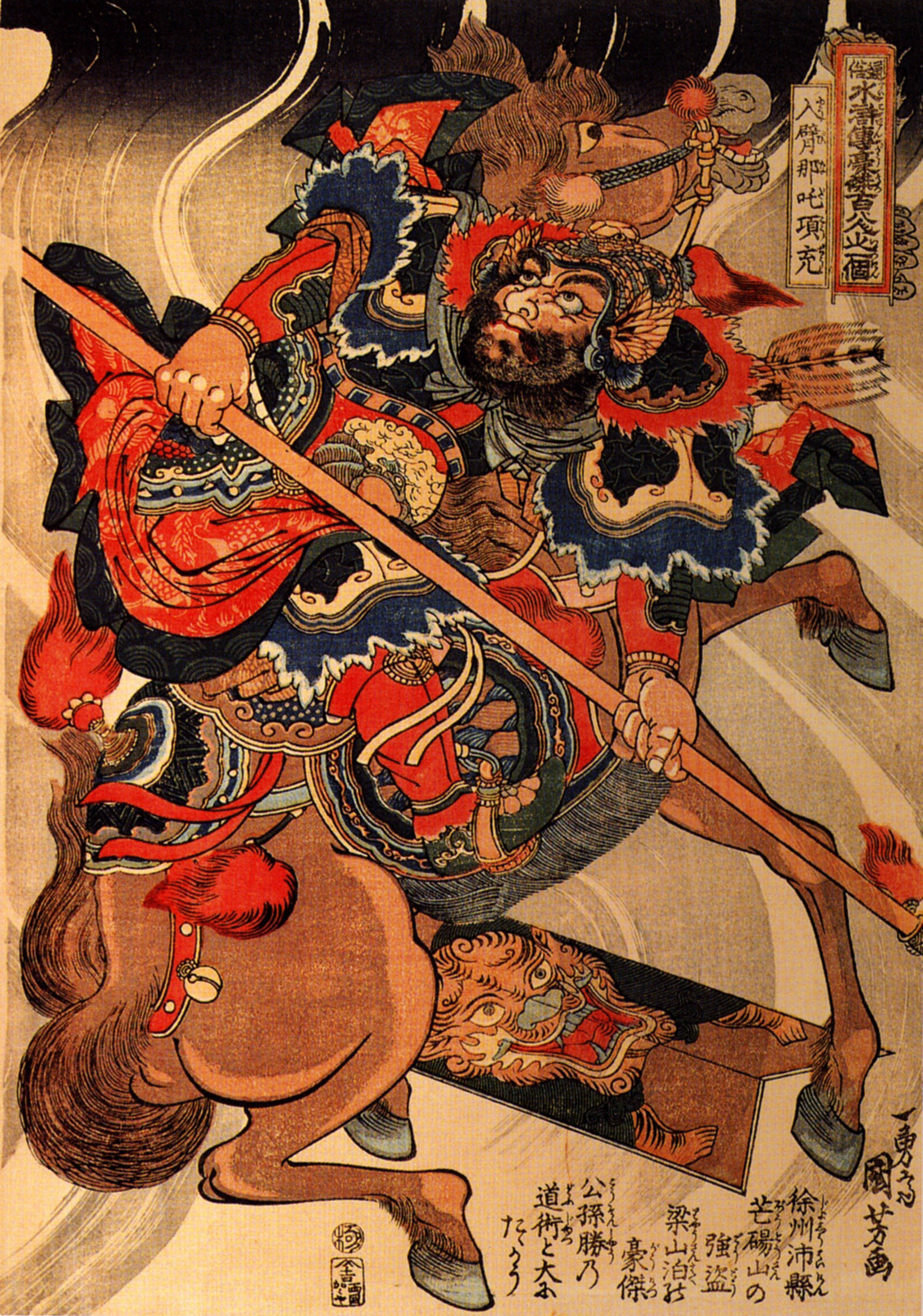
- an illustration of Xiang Chong by Utagawa Kuniyoshi
- First appearance: Chapter 59

In-universe information
- Nicknames: "Eight-armed Nezha" 八臂哪吒
- Weapon: spear, daggers, shield
- Origin: outlaw
- Designation: Infantry Commander of Liangshan
- Rank: 64th, Flying Star (地飛星) of the 72 Earthly Fiends
- Ancestral home / Place of origin: Pei County, Jiangsu

Chinese names
- Simplified Chinese: 项充
- Traditional Chinese: 項充
- Pinyin: Xiàng Chōng
- Wade–Giles: Hsiang Ch'ung

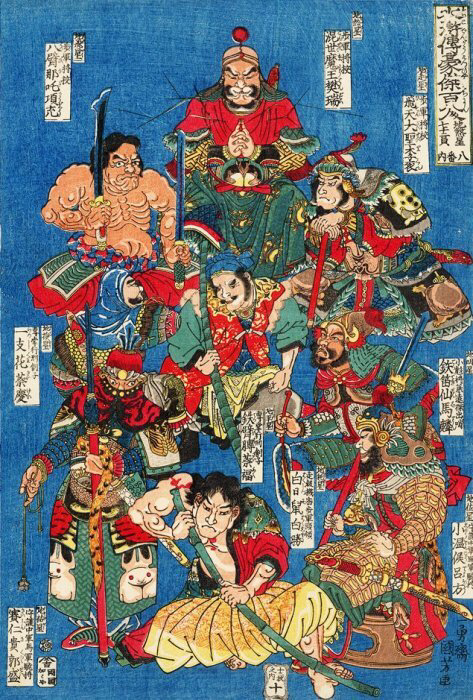
An illustration of nine of the 108 Heroes by Utagawa Kuniyoshi. Cai Fu is in the centre. The rest are (clockwise from top): Fan Rui, Li Gun, Ma Lin, Lü Fang, Bai Sheng, Guo Sheng, Cai Qing, and Xiang Chong.

Xiang Chong is a fictional character in Water Margin, one of the Classic Chinese Novels. Nicknamed "Eight-armed Nezha", he ranks 64th among the 108 Heroes and 28th among the 72 Earthly Fiends.

== Background ==
The novel describes Xiang Chong as a warrior who fights with an iron spear and a shield whose front has a beast's head carved on it. He also carries 24 daggers, which he throws with accuracy. Being a versatile fighter, he is nicknamed "Eight-armed Nezha" after the multi-headed and multi-armed warrior deity.

Originally from Pei County, Jiangsu, he and Li Gun serve as the deputies of Fan Rui, who leads an outlaw band of about 3,000 men at Mount Mangdang (芒碭山; north of present-day Yongcheng, Henan).

== Joining Liangshan ==
Fan Rui, Xiang Chong and Li Gun are first introduced in the novel when they boast about their superiority vis-à-vis their counterparts at Liangshan Marsh, and even declare that they are capable of wiping out Liangshan. When the Liangshan outlaws hear about it, they send Shi Jin to lead an attack on Mount Mangdang. However, Shi Jin cannot hold up against Xiang Chong and Li Gun, who inflict heavy casualties on the Liangshan forces. Soon, Liangshan reinforcements led by Song Jiang show up.

In the next battle, Fan Rui uses his sorcery to assist Xiang Chong and Li Gun in their assault by conjuring sandstorms to throw the Liangshan outlaws into disarray. However, the Liangshan outlaws, under their resident sorcerer Gongsun Sheng's guidance, have arranged themselves in the Eight Trigrams Formation. Gongsun Sheng, who is more powerful in Taoist sorcery compared to Fan Rui, uses his powers to engulf Xiang Chong and Li Gun in darkness, trapping them in the formation and causing them to fall into traps. Fan Rui is defeated and forced to retreat to his stronghold.

Song Jiang treats the captured Xiang Chong and Li Gun respectfully, and manages to convince them to surrender and join Liangshan. The duo agrees and returns to Mount Mangdang to meet Fan Rui, successfully persuading him to surrender and join Liangshan as well.

== Campaigns and death ==
Xiang Chong is appointed as a commander of the Liangshan infantry after 108 Heroes are fully assembled. He participates in the campaigns against the Liao invaders and rebel forces in Song territory after the outlaws receive amnesty from Emperor Huizong.

During the final campaign against Fang La's rebel forces, Xiang Chong and Li Gun are assigned to attack Muzhou (睦州; in present-day Hangzhou, Zhejiang). They encounter the enemy warrior Zheng Biao, who uses his lasso to trip Xiang Chong and kill him before he can get back on his feet.
