= Li Gun =

Fictional character in the Chinese classical novel Water Margin

- Water Margin character
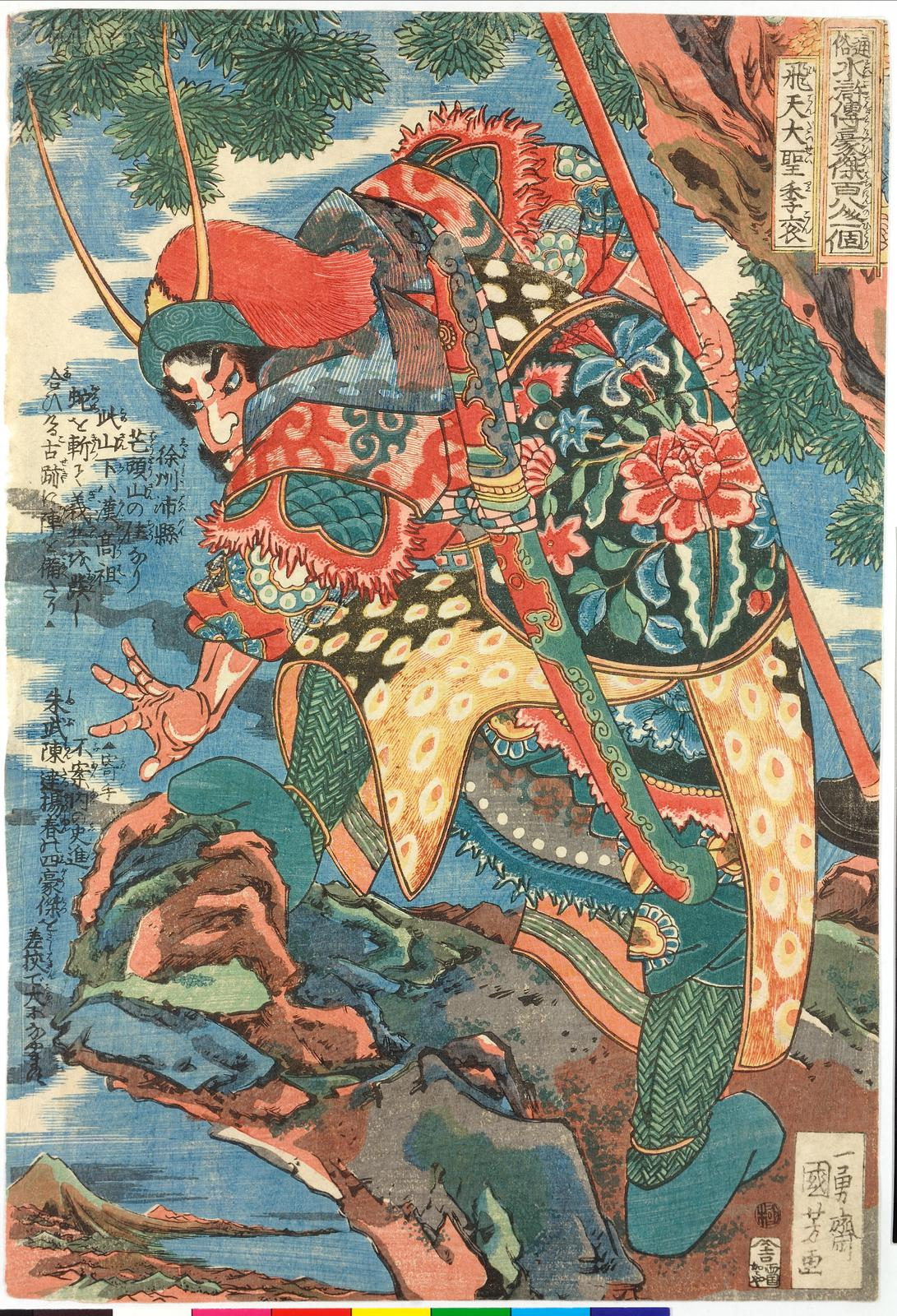
- an illustration of Li Gun by Utagawa Kuniyoshi
- First appearance: Chapter 59

In-universe information
- Nickname: "Sky Soaring Great Sage" 飛天大聖
- Weapon: sword, javelins, shield
- Origin: outlaw
- Designation: Infantry Commander of Liangshan
- Rank: 65th, Walking Star (地走星) of the 72 Earthly Fiends
- Ancestral home / Place of origin: Pei County, Jiangsu

Chinese names
- Simplified Chinese: 李衮
- Traditional Chinese: 李袞
- Pinyin: Lǐ Gǔn
- Wade–Giles: Li Kun

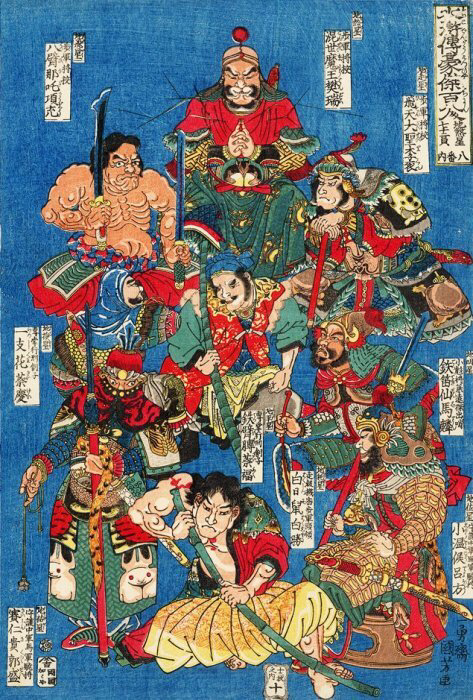
An illustration of nine of the 108 Heroes by Utagawa Kuniyoshi. Cai Fu is in the centre. The rest are (clockwise from top): Fan Rui, Li Gun, Ma Lin, Lü Fang, Bai Sheng, Guo Sheng, Cai Qing, and Xiang Chong.

Li Gun is a fictional character in Water Margin, one of the Classic Chinese Novels. Nicknamed "Sky Soaring Great Sage", he ranks 65th among the 108 Heroes and 29th among the 72 Earthly Fiends.

== Background ==
The novel describes Li Gun as a warrior who fights with a sword and a shield whose front has a beast's head carved on it. He also carries 24 short javelins, which he throws with accuracy. Being a versatile fighter, he is nicknamed "Sky Soaring Great Sage" after the "Great Sage Equal to Heaven" Sun Wukong.

Originally from Pei County, Jiangsu, he and Xiang Chong serve as the deputies of Fan Rui, who leads an outlaw band of about 3,000 men at Mount Mangdang (芒碭山; north of present-day Yongcheng, Henan).

== Joining Liangshan ==
Fan Rui, Xiang Chong and Li Gun are first introduced in the novel when they boast about their superiority vis-à-vis their counterparts at Liangshan Marsh, and even declare that they are capable of wiping out Liangshan. When the Liangshan outlaws hear about it, they send Shi Jin to lead an attack on Mount Mangdang. However, Shi Jin cannot hold up against Xiang Chong and Li Gun, who inflict heavy casualties on the Liangshan forces. Soon, Liangshan reinforcements led by Song Jiang show up.

In the next battle, Fan Rui uses his sorcery to assist Xiang Chong and Li Gun in their assault by conjuring sandstorms to throw the Liangshan outlaws into disarray. However, the Liangshan outlaws, under their resident sorcerer Gongsun Sheng's guidance, have arranged themselves in the Eight Trigrams Formation. Gongsun Sheng, who is more powerful in Taoist sorcery compared to Fan Rui, uses his powers to engulf Xiang Chong and Li Gun in darkness, trapping them in the formation and causing them to fall into traps. Fan Rui is defeated and forced to retreat back to his stronghold.

Song Jiang treats the captured Xiang Chong and Li Gun respectfully, and manages to convince them to surrender and join Liangshan. The duo agrees and returns to Mount Mangdang to meet Fan Rui, successfully persuading him to surrender and join Liangshan as well.

== Campaigns and death ==
Li Gun is appointed as a commander of the Liangshan infantry after 108 Heroes are fully assembled. He participates in the campaigns against the Liao invaders and rebel forces in Song territory after the outlaws receive amnesty from Emperor Huizong.

During the final campaign against Fang La's rebel forces, Li Gun and Xiang Chong are assigned to attack Muzhou (睦州; in present-day Hangzhou, Zhejiang). They encounter the enemy warrior Zheng Biao, who kills Xiang Chong. Determined to avenge his comrade, Li Gun chases Zheng Biao but accidentally falls into a stream and gets killed by enemy archers.
