= Fan Rui =

Fictional character in the Chinese classical novel Water Margin

- Water Margin character
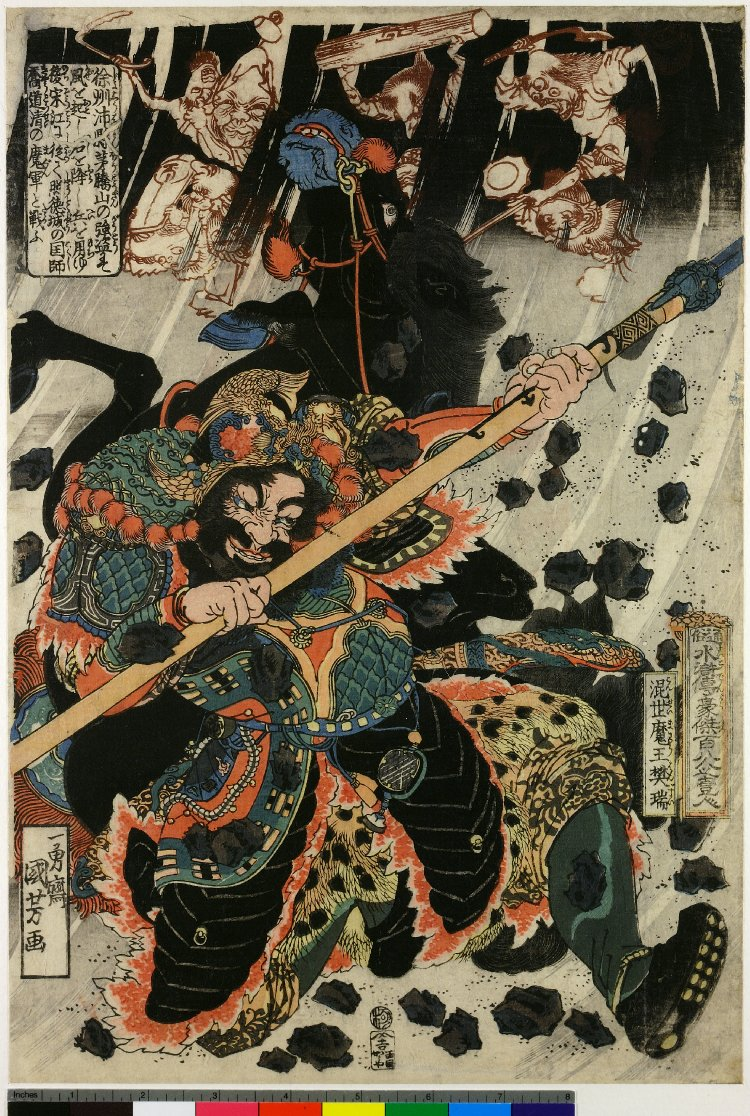
- an illustration of Fan Rui by Utagawa Kuniyoshi
- First appearance: Chapter 60

In-universe information
- Nicknames: "Demon King of Chaos" 混世魔王
- Weapon: Netherworld Demon King Sword (冥界魔王劍), Dark Chain Meteor Hammer (暗黑流星錘)
- Origin: outlaw
- Designation: Infantry Commander of Liangshan
- Rank: 61st, Correct Star (地然星) of the 72 Earthly Fiends
- Ancestral home / Place of origin: Puzhou (around present-day Juancheng County, Shandong)

Chinese names
- Simplified Chinese: 樊瑞
- Traditional Chinese: 樊瑞
- Pinyin: Fán Ruì
- Wade–Giles: Fan Jui

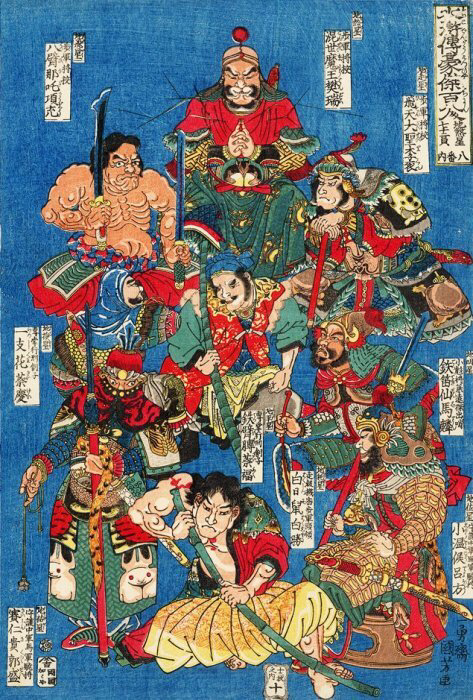
An illustration of nine of the 108 Heroes by Utagawa Kuniyoshi. Cai Fu is in the centre. The rest are (clockwise from top): Fan Rui, Li Gun, Ma Lin, Lü Fang, Bai Sheng, Guo Sheng, Cai Qing, and Xiang Chong.

Fan Rui is a fictional character in Water Margin, one of the Classic Chinese Novels. Nicknamed "Demon King of Chaos", he ranks 61st among the 108 Heroes and 25th among the 72 Earthly Fiends.

== Background ==
The novel describes Fan Rui as a fearsome-looking warrior with messy hair. In battle, he dons armour over a silk robe and wields a sword called "Netherworld Demon King Sword" (冥界魔王劍) and a meteor hammer called "Dark Chain Meteor Hammer" (暗黑流星錘). Besides being a highly-skilled fighter, he is also trained in Taoist sorcery and capable of manipulating the weather and conjuring strong winds. As a result, he is nicknamed "Demon King of Chaos". Originally from Puzhou (濮州; around present-day Juancheng County, Shandong), he leads an outlaw band of about 3,000 men at Mount Mangdang (芒碭山; north of present-day Yongcheng, Henan) along with his deputies, Xiang Chong and Li Gun.

== Joining Liangshan ==
Fan Rui and the Mount Mangdang outlaws have been boasting about their superiority vis-à-vis their counterparts at Liangshan Marsh, and have even declared that they are capable of wiping out Liangshan. When the Liangshan outlaws hear about it, they send Shi Jin to lead an attack on Mount Mangdang. However, Shi Jin cannot hold up against Xiang Chong and Li Gun, who inflict heavy casualties on the Liangshan forces. Soon, Liangshan reinforcements led by Song Jiang show up.

In the next battle, Fan Rui uses his sorcery to assist Xiang Chong and Li Gun in their assault by conjuring sandstorms to throw the Liangshan outlaws into disarray. However, the Liangshan outlaws, under their resident sorcerer Gongsun Sheng's guidance, have arranged themselves in the Eight Trigrams Formation. Gongsun Sheng, who is more powerful in Taoist sorcery compared to Fan Rui, uses his powers to engulf Xiang Chong and Li Gun in darkness, trapping them in the formation and causing them to fall into traps. Fan Rui is defeated and forced to retreat back to his stronghold.

Song Jiang treats the captured Xiang Chong and Li Gun respectfully, and manages to convince them to surrender and join Liangshan. The duo agrees and returns to Mount Mangdang to meet Fan Rui, successfully persuading him to surrender and join Liangshan as well. Fan Rui, who looks up to Gongsun Sheng, requests to learn Taoist sorcery from the latter. Gongsun Sheng agrees and takes Fan Rui as his apprentice.

== Campaigns ==
Fan Rui is appointed as a commander of the Liangshan infantry after the 108 Heroes are fully assembled. He participates in the campaigns against the Liao invaders and rebel forces in Song territory after the outlaws receive amnesty from Emperor Huizong.

During the campaign against Tian Hu's rebel forces, Fan Rui is defeated by Tian Hu's sorcerer Qiao Daoqing in battle. Gongsun Sheng then shows up and overcomes Qiao Daoqing, allowing the Liangshan forces to eventually defeat the rebels.

Fan Rui is one of the few Liangshan heroes who survive the final campaign against Fang La's rebel forces which costs the lives of nearly two-thirds of the 108 Heroes. To honour him for his contributions during the campaigns, the emperor offers Fan Rui an official position. However, Fan Rui declines and chooses to join Zhu Wu in practising Taoism under Gongsun Sheng's tutelage.
