= Lü Fang =

Fictional character in the Chinese classical novel Water Margin

- Water Margin character
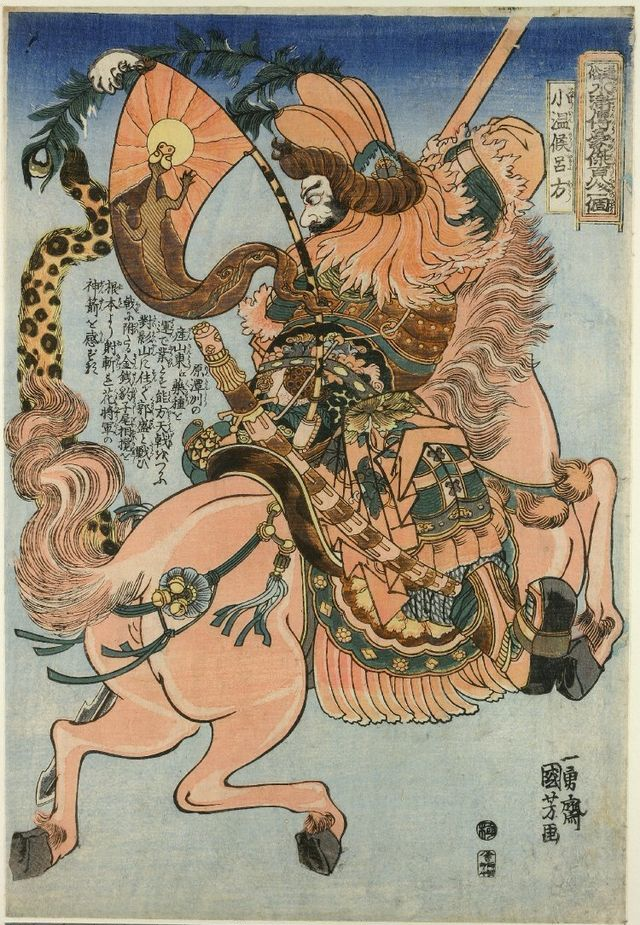
- an illustration of Lü Fang by Utagawa Kuniyoshi
- First appearance: Chapter 35

In-universe information
- Nickname: "Little Marquis of Wen" 小溫侯
- Weapon: "Sky Piercer" (方天畫戟)
- Origin: outlaw
- Designation: Central Camp Guardian of Liangshan
- Rank: 54th, Aid Star (地佐星) of the 72 Earthly Fiends
- Ancestral home / Place of origin: Tanzhou (around present-day Changsha, Hunan)

Chinese names
- Simplified Chinese: 吕方
- Traditional Chinese: 呂方
- Pinyin: Lǚ Fāng
- Wade–Giles: Lü Fang

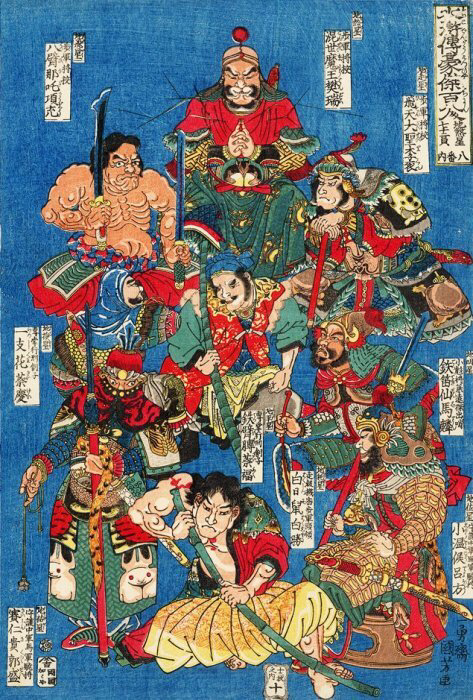
An illustration of nine of the 108 Heroes by Utagawa Kuniyoshi. Cai Fu is in the centre. The rest are (clockwise from top): Fan Rui, Li Gun, Ma Lin, Lü Fang, Bai Sheng, Guo Sheng, Cai Qing, and Xiang Chong.

Lü Fang is a fictional character in Water Margin, one of the Classic Chinese Novels. Nicknamed "Little Marquis of Wen", he ranks 54th among the 108 Heroes and 18th among the 72 Earthly Fiends.

== Background ==
The novel describes Lü Fang as a warrior dressed in a suit of red armour over a flowery robe tied by a silk belt. He also wears a knot-like headdress topped with a long feather. In battle, he rides a red horse and wields a fangtian ji. As he resembles the Han dynasty warrior Lü Bu, he is nicknamed "Little Marquis of Wen". (Note: Lü Bu held the peerage "Marquis of Wen" (溫侯).)

Originally a medicine trader from Tanzhou (around present-day Changsha, Hunan), Lü Fang suffered losses while doing business in Shandong and could not afford the journey home. He becomes an outlaw at Shadow-Facing Hill (對影山), gaining greater fame after defeating many challengers over the years.

== Duel with Guo Sheng ==
When the warrior Guo Sheng – who also wields a fangtian ji – hears of Lü Fang's prowess, he comes to Shadow-Facing Hill to challenge the latter to determine who is more worthy of using the weapon. As neither of them can overcome his opponent, their duel continues day after day.

Meanwhile, a group of outlaws led by Song Jiang, Hua Rong, and others are on their way to join the outlaw band at Liangshan Marsh after defeating government forces in Qingzhou (青州; in present-day Shandong). They pass by Shadow-Facing Hill and come across the duel between the warriors. At that moment, the tassels of Lü Fang and Guo Sheng's fangtian jis have gotten tangled, and the two are struggling to free their weapons. Hua Rong fires an arrow which hits exactly the tangled spot and separates the weapons, drawing cheers from everyone watching. Lü Fang and Guo Sheng stop their duel and introduce themselves to the group. Upon learning that the group is on its way to Liangshan, the two warriors request to join them and eventually become part of the Liangshan outlaw band.

== Campaigns and death ==
After the 108 Heroes are fully assembled, Lü Fang and Guo Sheng are appointed as guardians of the central camp to oversee the protection of the commanders whenever Liangshan forces go to battle. Lü Fang participates in the campaigns against the Liao invaders and rebel forces in Song territory after the outlaws receive amnesty from Emperor Huizong.

During the final campaign against Fang La's rebel forces, Lü Fang is assigned to attack Black Dragon Ridge (烏龍嶺; northeast of present-day Meicheng Town, Jiande, Zhejiang). He encounters the enemy warrior Bai Qin, whom he duels with on horseback. After an inconclusive fight, they discard their weapons and grapple with each other, eventually both falling off a cliff to their deaths.
