= Yan Qing =

Fictional character in the Chinese classical novel Water Margin

- Water Margin character
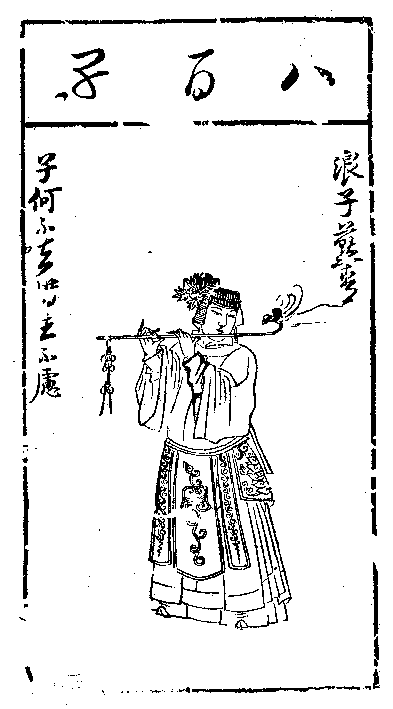
- an illustration of Yan Qing by Chen Hongshou
- First appearance: Chapter 60

In-universe information
- Nicknames: "Wanderer" / "Prodigal" 浪子
- Weapon: crossbow
- Origin: Lu Junyi's steward
- Designation: Infantry Commander of Liangshan
- Rank: 36th, Skilful Star (天巧星) of the 36 Heavenly Spirits
- Ancestral home / Place of origin: Daming Prefecture (present-day Daming County, Hebei)

Chinese names
- Simplified Chinese: 燕青
- Traditional Chinese: 燕青
- Pinyin: Yàn Qīng
- Wade–Giles: Yen Ch'ing

Yan Qing is a fictional character in Water Margin, one of the Classic Chinese Novels. Nicknamed "Wanderer / Prodigal", he ranks last among the 36 Heavenly Spirits, the first third of the 108 Heroes. A well-known character from the novel, the refined bon vivant Yan Qing, whose sensual appearance, female contacts, and cultured repertoire make him an exotic addition to the stolidly androcentric and misogynistic company of his peers.

== Historical basis ==
Yan Qing is believed to be inspired by Liang Xing (梁興), a Song dynasty warrior who served under the general Yue Fei and fought in the wars against the Jin dynasty in the first half of the 12th century. According to historical records, Liang Xing fought hundreds of battles against Jin forces, and killed more than 300 enemy officers. In 1135, he killed the Jin officers Yelu Ma Wu and Geng Guanglu at the Taihang Mountains. In the winter of that year, he led his troops across the Yellow River to join Yue Fei in fighting Jin forces. After Yue Fei returned, he continued to fight against Jin forces on the north banks of the Yellow River. Later, he was promoted to the positions of Imperial Guard Doctor, Governor of Zhongzhou, and Deputy Commander of the Imperial Front Army of Ezhou.

Furthermore, in the Remaining Stories of the Xuanhe Period of the Great Song Dynasty, composed during the Song and Yuan dynasties, Yan Qing is already depicted as one of the 36 followers of the rebel leader Song Jiang. Similarly, in Gong Kai's Praise of the 36 Men of Song Jiang' from the same period, Yan Qing is mentioned with the poetic description: "In the alleys of Pingkang, who could know your name? The spring scenery of Taihang blooms with a foot of green." Both works are considered early prototypes or foundational influences for the novel Water Margin.

== In Water Margin ==
=== Background ===
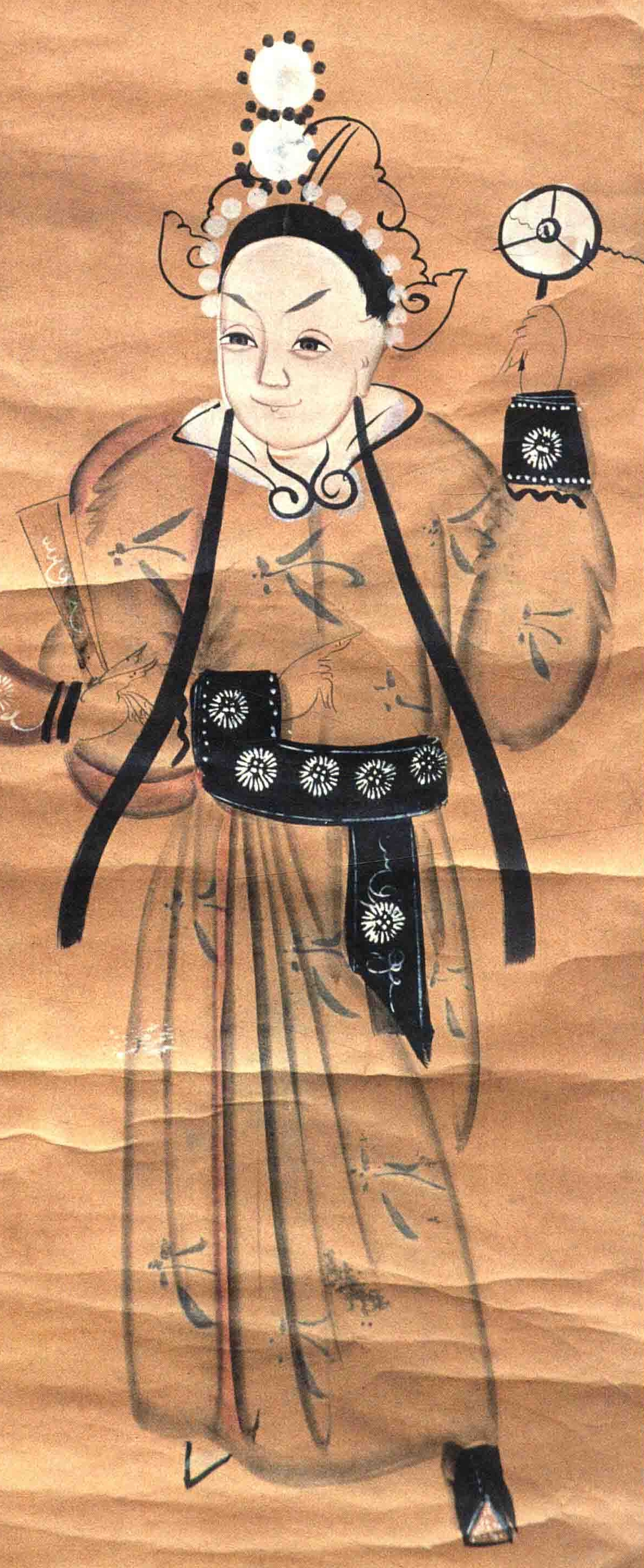
A Qing dynasty woodblock print of Yan Qing from Gaomi at the National Art Museum of China

The novel describes Yan Qing as a handsome youth over six chi tall, with a fair complexion, red lips, thick eyebrows, broad shoulders, a narrow waist, and large, bright-coloured floral tattoos all over his body. Besides being highly-skilled in martial arts, archery and wrestling, he also sings well and plays various instruments. His charming looks, aptitude for picking up new skills, and social astuteness make him an ideal candidate for a spy.

Orphaned as a child, Yan Qing was taken in and raised by the wealthy squire Lu Junyi, who lives in Daming Prefecture (大名府; present-day Daming County, Hebei). He expresses his gratitude to Lu Junyi by serving loyally as a steward in the Lu residence alongside Li Gu, Lu's other steward.

=== As Lu Junyi's steward ===
When Song Jiang is serving as the acting chief of the outlaw band at Liangshan Marsh, he recalls hearing about Lu Junyi and hopes to recruit Lu to the Liangshan cause of "upholding justice on Heaven's behalf" and boost their reputation.

Disguised as a fortune teller, Liangshan's chief strategist Wu Yong travels to Daming Prefecture and tricks Lu Junyi into leaving home and heading towards Liangshan. Lu Junyi goes on the trip with Li Gu, leaving Yan Qing in charge of the household in his absence. Near Liangshan, Lu Junyi falls into a trap and gets captured by the outlaws, who treat him respectfully and host him as an honoured guest at their stronghold for months, even though he declines to join them. Meanwhile, they secretly release Li Gu, who has accompanied Lu Junyi on the trip, and lie to him that his master has become an outlaw.

=== Saving Lu Junyi's life ===
Li Gu, who has been having an affair with Lu Junyi's wife, reports to the authorities that his master has joined the Liangshan outlaws. He then takes over the Lu residence with Lu's wife, and expels Yan Qing from the household when the latter tries to stop him. When Lu Junyi finally leaves Liangshan and returns to Daming Prefecture, he encounters Yan Qing, who tells him what has happened during his absence.

Refusing to believe Yan Qing, Lu Junyi heads home and gets arrested and imprisoned. Li Gu attempts to bribe the wardens Cai Fu and Cai Qing to murder Lu Junyi in prison, but the Cais have been counter-bribed by the Liangshan outlaws to take good care of Lu. In the end, Lu is exiled to Shamen Island (沙門島; present-day Changdao County, Shandong).

When Li Gu bribes the two escorts to murder Lu Junyi on the way to Shamen Island, Yan Qing shows up with a makeshift crossbow and kills the guards, saving his master. Lu Junyi, weakened from starvation and torture in prison, is unable to travel far with Yan Qing. When Yan Qing temporarily leaves his master to look for food, government forces find Lu Junyi and capture him again.

Meanwhile, Yan Qing runs into the Liangshan outlaw Shi Xiu, who has come to gather intelligence in Daming Prefecture, and attempts to rob him without knowing his identity. After they realise who each other is and Shi Xiu learns of what has happened, he tells Yan Qing to go to Liangshan to seek help. Shi Xiu infiltrates Daming Prefecture and learns that Lu Junyi has been sentenced to death, so he storms the execution ground alone in an attempt to rescue Lu Junyi. However, his efforts are futile as both of them get overwhelmed and taken captive by government forces.

This time, Liang Shijie, Daming Prefecture's governor, decides to keep Lu Junyi and Shi Xiu alive as hostages as the Liangshan outlaws, having been notified of the situation by Yan Qing, have shown up in full force to attack the prefecture and save the two men. Although the outlaws initially suffer setbacks, they ultimately break through the defences by infiltrating the prefecture in disguise during the Lantern Festival and cause chaos, seizing the opportunity to rescue Lu Junyi and Shi Xiu. After being freed, Lu Junyi returns home with Yan Qing and kills Li Gu and his unfaithful wife in revenge. Lu Junyi and Yan Qing then both become part of the Liangshan outlaw band.

=== Life at Liangshan ===
Yan Qing is appointed as a commander of the Liangshan infantry after the 108 Heroes are fully assembled. During his time in Liangshan, Yan Qing develops a close friendship with Li Kui, whom he regularly spars and wrestles with. On one occasion, he and Li Kui travel in disguise to Tai'anzhou, where they come across a lei tai contest staged by a burly wrestler, Ren Yuan, who claims he is undefeated throughout the empire. Yan Qing challenges Ren Yuan and defeats his opponent with his skill and agility despite being much smaller in stature. When Ren Yuan's followers rush in to snatch the prizes, Li Kui gets into a fight with them and some spectators recognise him as one of the Liangshan outlaws. Government forces rush in to arrest Li Kui and Yan Qing, resulting in a stampede. Yan Qing and Li Kui fight their way out of Tai'anzhou and return safely to Liangshan.

=== Role in securing amnesty for Liangshan ===
Song Jiang, having become Liangshan's chief, has a grand plan to secure amnesty for all the outlaws from Emperor Huizong and seek opportunities for the outlaws to redeem themselves by serving the ruling Song dynasty. When he hears the emperor has been secretly seeing Li Shishi, a well-known courtesan in the capital Dongjing (東京; present-day Kaifeng, Henan), he sends Yan Qing to contact her, hoping to get her to set up a clandestine meeting between him and the emperor. Li Shishi is infatuated with Yan Qing for his dashing appearance and tries to seduce him, but he rejects her advances and instead becomes sworn siblings with her.

One night when the emperor visits Li Shishi again, she introduces Yan Qing as her cousin to him. The emperor, charmed and entertained by Yan Qing's musical talent, hears of the Liangshan outlaws' desire for amnesty. At Li Shishi's insistence, the emperor also writes an edict granting Yan Qing immunity from prosecution except for capital offences, and promises to seriously consider the outlaws' request for amnesty. After that, Yan Qing and fellow outlaw Dai Zong visit Su Yuanjing, a grand marshal sympathetic to the outlaws, and gets him to help the outlaws put in a good word in front of the emperor.

=== Campaigns and later life ===
Song Jiang's dream finally comes true when Emperor Huizong grants amnesty to the Liangshan outlaws, and gives them the opportunity to serve the Song dynasty by going on campaigns to fight the Liao invaders and rebel forces in Song territory.

Midway during the final campaign against Fang La's rebel forces, Yan Qing and Chai Jin infiltrate the rebel base, Qingxi County (清溪縣; present-day Chun'an County, Zhejiang), in disguise as merchants and carry out an elaborate espionage mission that leads to Fang La's eventual defeat and capture.

After the campaign, while the surviving Liangshan heroes head to the capital to report their victory to the emperor, Yan Qing quietly slips away en route, leaving behind a poem saying that he does not seek glory despite his achievements. In legend, he goes to find Li Shishi and leaves with her to lead a reclusive and peaceful life.

== In other works ==
In the novel General Yue Fei written by Qian Cai during the Qing dynasty, Yan Qing is the leader of a bandit group at She Mountain in Haiyan County, Zhejiang. Emperor Gaozong of the Song dynasty, while fleeing the invading forces of the Jin dynasty, boarded a ship with some of his subjects and sailed out to sea, only to be taken captive by the bandits at She Mountain. Upon learning that his men had captured the Song emperor, Yan Qing had those men bound and executed for behaving disrespectfully towards the emperor. However, Li Gang, one of Emperor Gaozong's subjects, rebuked and cursed Yan Qing and his bandits. Yan Qing then sent the emperor and his subjects back out to sea and left them to survive on their own.
