= Hua Rong =

Fictional character in the Chinese classical novel Water Margin

- Water Margin character
- A Qing dynasty illustration of Hua Rong
- First appearance: Chapter 33

In-universe information
- Nicknames: "Little Li Guang" 小李廣 "Silver Lancer" 銀槍手
- Weapon: spear / lance; bow and arrows
- Origin: Military officer
- Designation: Tiger Cub Vanguard Commander of Liangshan
- Rank: 9th, Hero Star (天英星) of the 36 Heavenly Spirits
- Ancestral home / Place of origin: Qingzhou, Shandong

Chinese names
- Simplified Chinese: 花荣
- Traditional Chinese: 花榮
- Pinyin: Huā Róng
- Wade–Giles: Hua Jung

Hua Rong is a fictional character in Water Margin, one of the Classic Chinese Novels. Nicknamed "Little Li Guang", he ranks ninth among the 36 Heavenly Spirits, the first third of the 108 Heroes.

== Background ==
The novel depicts Hua Rong as a handsome-looking man with red lips, sparkling white teeth, a narrow waist, and broad shoulders. Deadly with a bow and arrows, he is nicknamed "Little Li Guang" after the Han dynasty general Li Guang, whose skill in archery was legendary. Hua Rong serves as a military officer in Qingfeng Fort (清風寨; in present-day Qingzhou, Shandong) under Liu Gao, the fort's commandant, who in turn answers to the governor of Qingzhou. Besides his prowess in archery, he is also highly-skilled at using the spear / lance, hence he is also nicknamed "Silver Lancer" (銀槍手) alongside "Golden Lancer" Xu Ning.

== Battle of Qingfeng Fort ==
When Song Jiang flees Yuncheng County after killing his mistress Yan Poxi, he heads to Qingfeng Fort to take shelter in Hua Rong's residence. En route, he befriends the outlaws at the nearby Mount Qingfeng (清風山) and convinces them to release Liu Gao's wife, whom they have abducted earlier.

While touring the fort during the Lantern Festival, Song Jiang is spotted by Liu Gao's wife, who lies to her husband that Song is one of the outlaws who kidnapped and attempted to rape her. Believing his wife, Liu Gao orders Song Jiang to be arrested and imprisoned.

Hua Rong tries to clarify the misunderstanding and get Liu Gao to release Song Jiang. When the commandant refuses, Hua Rong frees Song Jiang by force and takes him back to his residence. Liu Gao sends his men to arrest Song Jiang again, but Hua Rong scares them away with his archery prowess.

Liu Gao seeks help from his superior Murong Yanda, the governor of Qingzhou, who sends a military officer, Huang Xin, to Qingfeng Fort. Pretending to mediate the conflict, Huang Xin lures Hua Rong into a trap and captures him along with Song Jiang. After that, Huang Xin and Liu Gao lead their men to escort Hua Rong and Song Jiang as captives back to Qingzhou, but they are ambushed along the way by the Mount Qingfeng outlaws, who kill Liu Gao and rescue the prisoners. Huang Xin retreats back to the fort and reports the situation to Murong Yanda, who sends Qin Ming to lead troops to eliminate the outlaws.

During the battle, Hua Rong duels with Qin Ming on horseback and lures him into a trap, resulting in Qin being captured by the outlaws. Song Jiang treats Qin Ming respectfully and attempts to persuade him to join the outlaws, but Qin refuses even though he spends the night at the outlaw stronghold as their guest. That night, unknown to Qin Ming, the outlaws disguise themselves as him and his men and attack Qingzhou, causing Murong Yanda to believe that Qin Ming has joined the outlaws.

When Qin Ming returns to Qingzhou, Murong Yanda announces that he has executed Qin's family and orders archers to fire at Qin, driving him back. Devastated by the loss of his family, Qin Ming wanders around aimlessly until he meets Song Jiang and the outlaws again and learns of what they had done. Although he is initially furious, he ultimately accepts his fate and becomes an outlaw. To appease Qin Ming further, Song Jiang arranges for him to marry Hua Rong's sister. Qin Ming then heads to Qingfeng Fort and convinces Huang Xin to join the outlaws as well, after which all of them head to the outlaw stronghold at Liangshan Marsh.

== Life at Liangshan ==
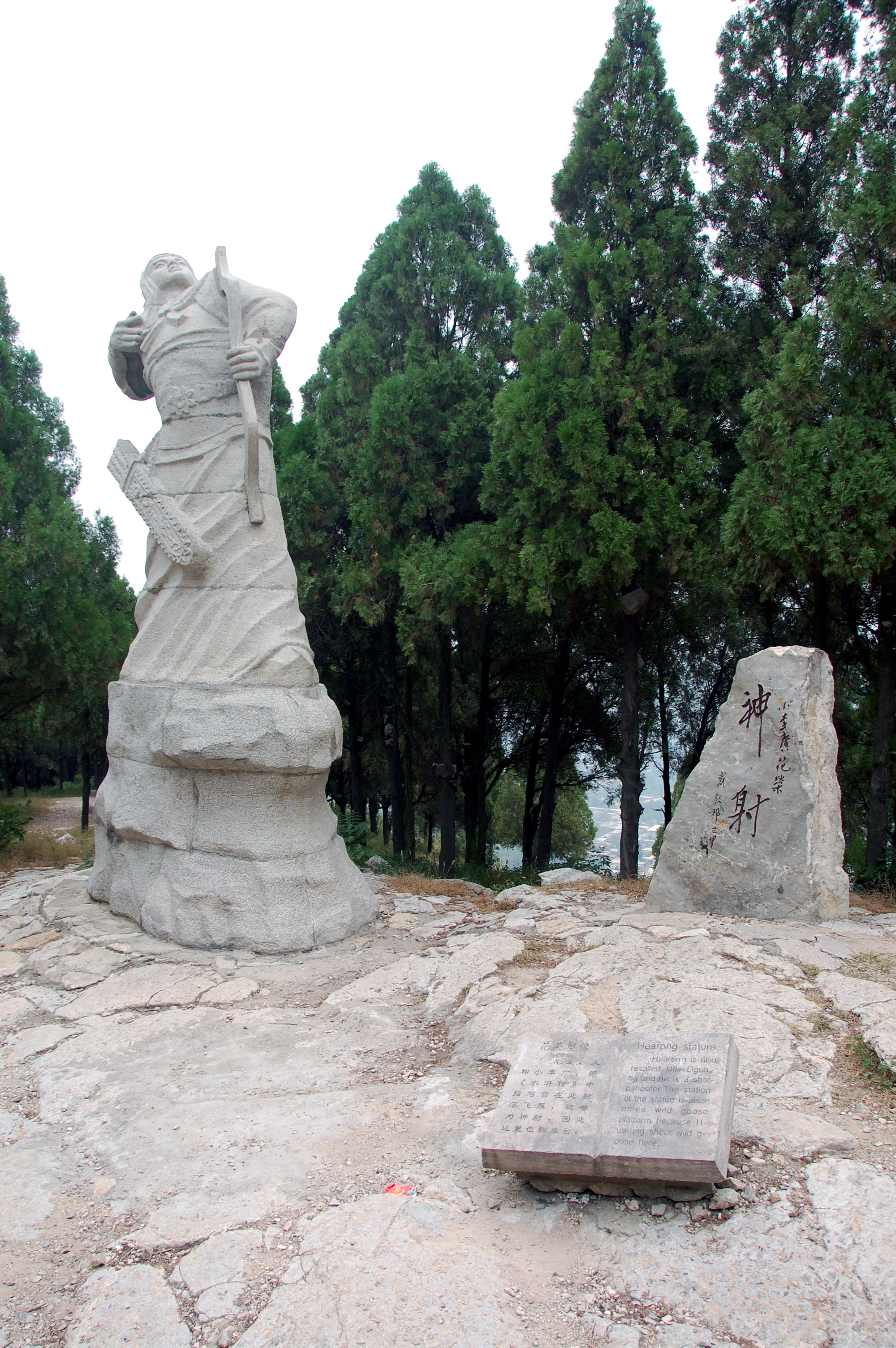
A stone statue of Hua Rong on Mount Liang.

En route to Liangshan Marsh, the group chances upon a duel between two warriors, Lü Fang and Guo Sheng, at Mount Duiying (對影山). When the tassels of their halberds are entangled, Hua Rong fires an arrow from afar which breaks the knot and separates them. Stunned by Hua Rong's archery prowess, Lü Fang and Guo Sheng greet the group and join them on their journey to Liangshan.

After everyone reaches their destination, the Liangshan outlaws' chief Chao Gai is initially sceptical when he hears of Hua Rong's feat. While they are on a tour of Liangshan, Hua Rong proves his archery skill by shooting down a pinpointed wild goose flying in a flock, awing everyone. His archery prowess subsequently serves Liangshan well in battles against their enemies. During the outlaws' first assault on the Zhu Family Village, Hua Rong shoots down a lantern used by the enemy as a signal, allowing the outlaws to safely withdraw after falling into ambushes and traps outside the village. During the battle of Gaotangzhou, he also shoots down an enemy officer with a single arrow shot.

== Death ==
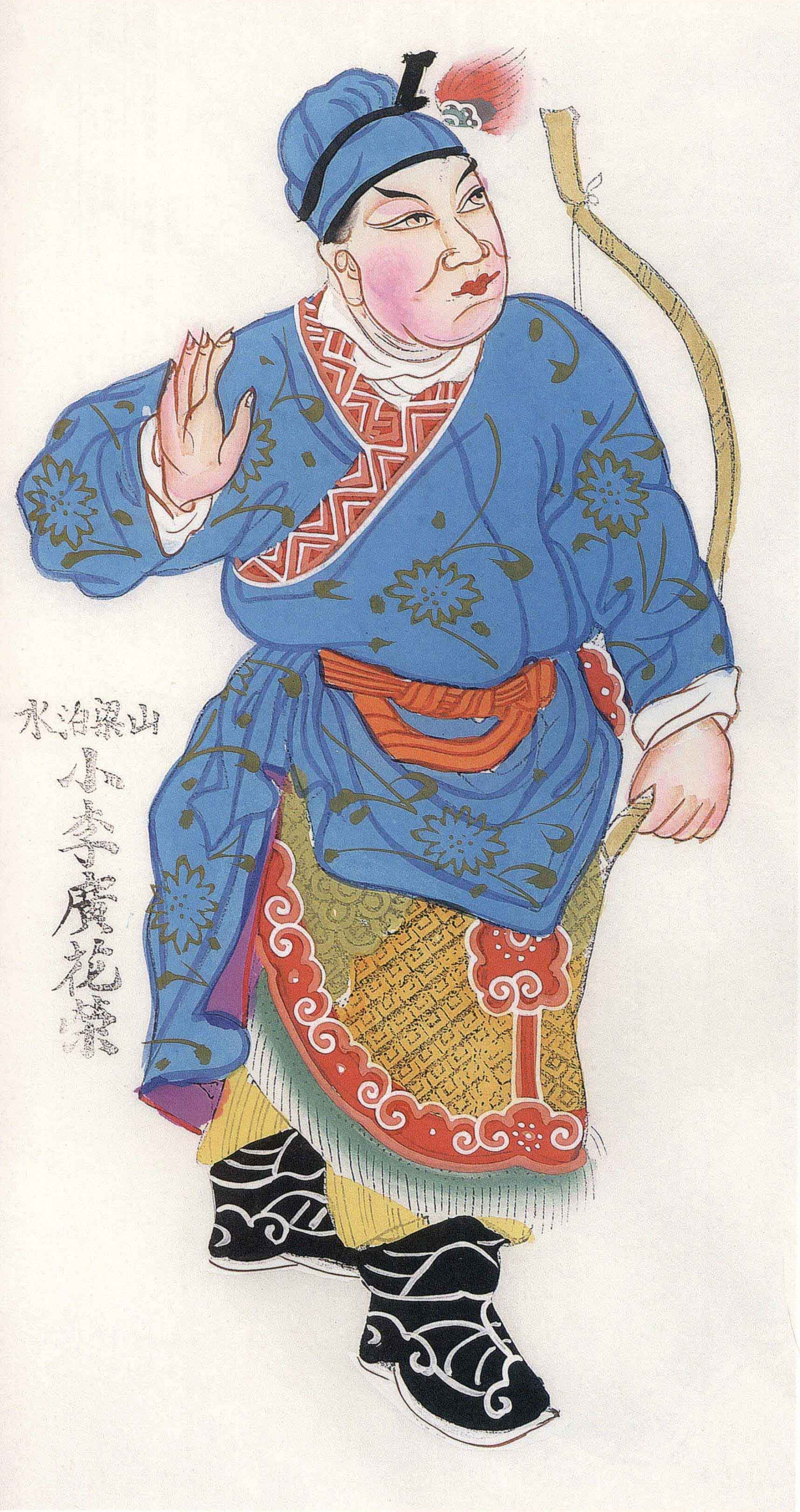
A portrait of Hua Rong as a door god.

Hua Rong is appointed as one of the eight Tiger Cub Vanguard Commanders of the Liangshan cavalry after the 108 Heroes are fully assembled. He participates in the campaigns against the Liao invaders and rebel forces in Song territory after the outlaws receive amnesty from Emperor Huizong.

Hua Rong survives the final campaign, which cost the lives of about two-thirds of the 108 Heroes. To honour him for his contributions, the emperor appoints him as a military officer in Yingtian Prefecture (應天府; present-day Shangqiu, Henan).

One night, Hua Rong dreams of Song Jiang, who tells him that he has been poisoned to death by the corrupt officials in the Song government who are jealous of the former outlaws' achievements. After waking up, he heads to Chuzhou (楚州; present-day Huai'an, Jiangsu), where he meets Wu Yong and they find the graves of Song Jiang and Li Kui. Overwhelmed by grief, Hua Rong and Wu Yong hang themselves from a tree beside the graves.
