= Lu Junyi =

Fictional character in the Chinese classical novel Water Margin

- Water Margin character
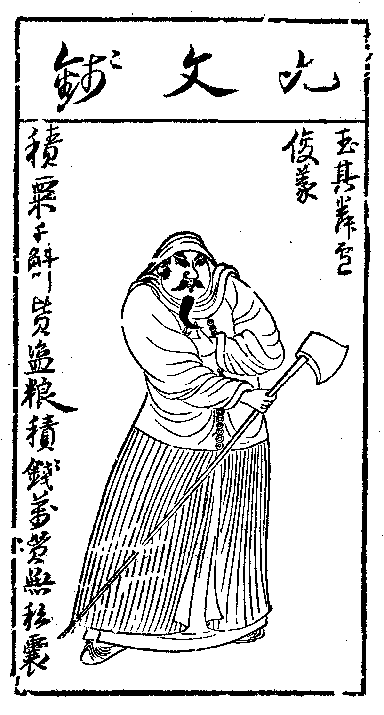
- an illustration of Lu Junyi by Chen Hongshou
- First appearance: Chapter 60

In-universe information
- Nicknames: Jade Qilin 玉麒麟
- Weapon: spear / lance, staff, podao
- Origin: Squire
- Designation: Deputy Leader of Liangshan
- Rank: 2nd, Strength Star (天罡星) of the 36 Heavenly Spirits
- Ancestral home / Place of origin: Daming Prefecture (present-day Daming County, Hebei)

Chinese names
- Simplified Chinese: 卢俊义
- Traditional Chinese: 盧俊義
- Pinyin: Lú Jùnyì
- Wade–Giles: Lu Chün-i

Lu Junyi is a fictional character in Water Margin, one of the Classic Chinese Novels. Nicknamed "Jade Qilin", he ranks second among the 36 Heavenly Spirits, the first third of the 108 Heroes. In folktales derived from the novel, Lu Junyi is a martial arts apprentice of Zhou Tong, who purportedly trained the Song dynasty general Yue Fei in archery.

== Background ==
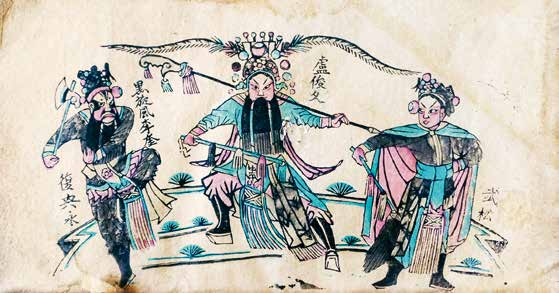
A late Qing dynasty opera image of (from left to right) Li Kui, Lu Junyi, and Wu Song.

The novel describes Lu Junyi as a nine chi-tall man with sparkling eyes, and the countenance and aura of a majestic deity. A native of Daming Prefecture (大名府; present-day Daming County, Hebei), he is a highly-skilled fighter, specialising in polearms such as the staff, spear / lance, and podao. His formidable combat prowess, impressive appearance, and prestigious status as a wealthy squire earn him the nickname "Jade Qilin".

== Arrest and imprisonment ==
When Song Jiang is serving as the acting chief of the outlaw band at Liangshan Marsh after Chao Gai's death, he hears about Lu Junyi and hopes to recruit him to boost Liangshan's reputation.

Disguised as a fortune-teller, Liangshan's chief strategist Wu Yong travels to Daming Prefecture, where he attracts Lu Junyi's attention by creating a commotion outside his house. Lu Junyi invites Wu Yong in and asks about his future. To his shock, Wu Yong warns him that he will die within 100 days. When Lu Junyi asks how to avert that fate, Wu Yong says the remedy is to leave home and travel southeast for more than 1,000 li. Before leaving, Wu Yong writes a poem on a wall in the house, claiming this will protect him for the time being. The poem has a hidden message that Lu Junyi will rebel against the Song government.

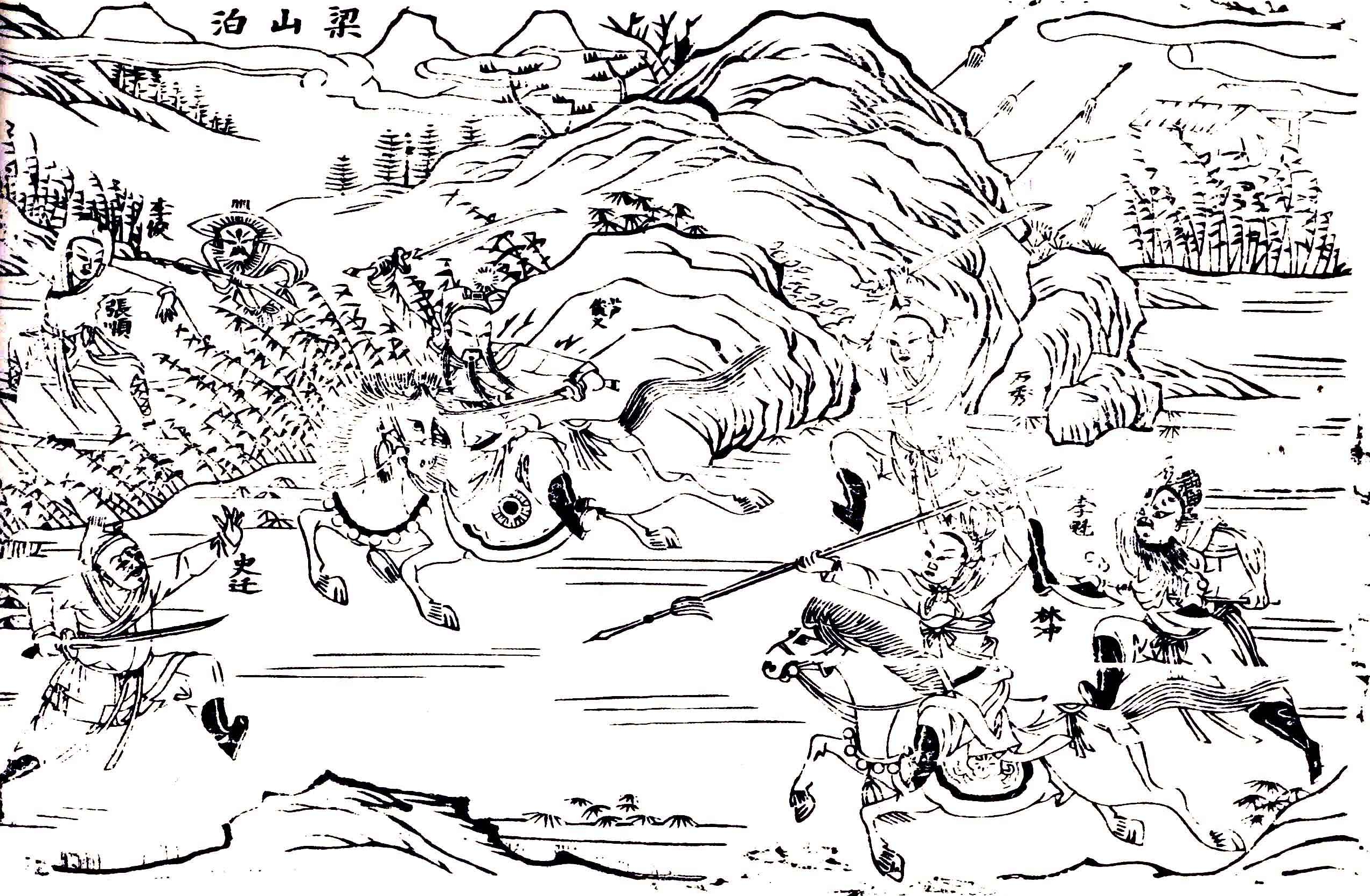
Lu Junyi (centre) captured by Zhang Shun and others.

Trusting Wu Yong's words, Lu Junyi travels southeast with his steward Li Gu and some servants. The group passes by Liangshan Marsh, where Lu Junyi gets lured into a trap and ends up being captured by Li Jun and Zhang Shun. He is taken to Song Jiang, who treats him with utmost respect and mitigates his hostility. Although Lu Junyi refuses to join the outlaws, he continues to stay at their stronghold as an honoured guest for months. Meanwhile, the outlaws secretly release Li Gu and lie to him that his master has joined them, with the poem serving as evidence.

When Lu Junyi finally leaves Liangshan, he hurries home and encounters Yan Qing, his other steward who has been reduced to begging on the streets. Yan Qing tells Lu Junyi that Li Gu, who has long had an affair with his master's wife, has reported to the authorities that Lu Junyi is in league with the Liangshan outlaws. Li Gu has also expelled Yan Qing from the household. Not believing Yan Qing, Lu Junyi goes home and is arrested. Li Gu takes over the residence and marries Lu Junyi's wife.

Li Gu attempts to bribe the jailers Cai Fu and Cai Qing to murder Lu Junyi in prison, but the Cais have been counter-bribed by the outlaws to take good care of Lu Junyi. In the end, Lu Junyi is exiled to Shamen Island (沙門島; present-day Changdao County, Shandong). Li Gu bribes the two escorts to kill Lu Junyi on the way, but Yan Qing shows up and kills the escorts when they are about to murder his master.

When Yan Qing temporarily leaves Lu Junyi to look for food, government forces track down a weakened Lu Junyi and capture him. Liang Shijie, the prefect of Daming Prefecture, orders Lu Junyi's immediate execution, but Liangshan's Shi Xiu, who has come to Daming Prefecture to gather intel, storms the execution ground alone in an attempt to save Lu Junyi. Both of them end up being overwhelmed and taken captive.

This time, Liang Shijie decides to keep Lu Junyi and Shi Xiu alive as hostages since the Liangshan outlaws are attacking Daming Prefecture. Although the outlaws are initially unable to breach the city walls, they eventually infiltrate the city during the Lantern Festival and cause chaos, seizing the chance to break into the prison and save Lu Junyi and Shi Xiu. Lu Junyi heads home and kills Li Gu and his unfaithful wife in revenge before joining Liangshan.

== Capturing Shi Wengong ==
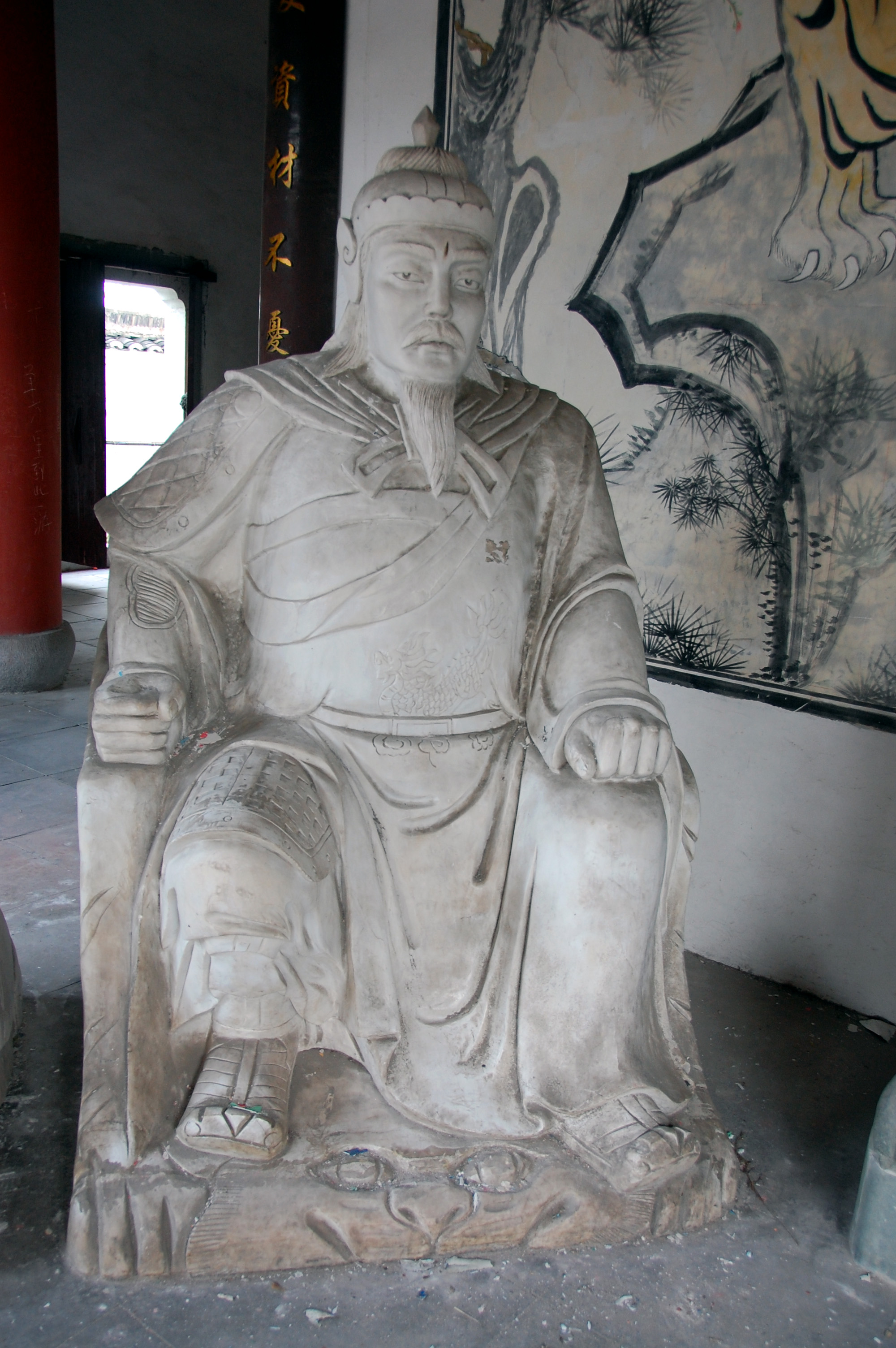
A stone statue of Lu Junyi at the Hengdian World Studios.

Lu Junyi joins the Liangshan outlaws in attacking the Zeng Family Fortress, whose martial arts instructor Shi Wengong killed Liangshan's chief Chao Gai earlier. On the night the outlaws breach the fortress's defences, Lu intercepts Shi Wengong while he is attempting to escape and knocks him off his horse, capturing him.

As Chao Gai's dying wish is that whoever avenges him becomes Liangshan's next chief, Lu Junyi should rightfully take the position but he firmly declines. It is then decided that, between Lu and Song Jiang, whoever first captures the prefecture assigned to him – Dongping for Song Jiang and Dongchang for Lu Junyi – will be Liangshan's chief. Song Jiang wins the contest as Lu Junyi has to deal with the formidable warrior Zhang Qing at Dongchang. Although the outlaws ultimately overcome Zhang Qing and capture Dongchang, Song Jiang is the undisputed winner of the contest. Lu Junyi then takes the second leadership position in Liangshan and remains in it when the 108 Heroes are fully assembled.

== Death ==
After the Liangshan outlaws receive amnesty from Emperor Huizong, Lu Junyi remains as Song Jiang's second-in-command when the Liangshan forces go on campaigns against the Liao invaders and rebel forces in Song territory. Lu Junyi distinguishes himself in battle during the campaigns, often leading part of the Liangshan forces on his own. After the last campaign is over, the emperor honours him by appointing him as an official in Luzhou (廬州; around present-day Hefei, Anhui).

However, the corrupt officials are jealous that the former outlaws are doing well. In their calculation, Lu Junyi must be eliminated first as he might start a revolt if Song Jiang is killed. They urge the emperor to summon Lu Junyi to the capital, where he is served – in the emperor's name – an alcoholic drink secretly laced with poison.

Unaware that he has been poisoned, Lu Junyi suffers from severe abdominal pain on the way back to Luzhou, so he cannot ride on horseback and instead has to travel by boat. When he comes to the Huai River at Sizhou, he feels dizzy and falls into the water, eventually drowning as he cannot swim. The local authorities retrieve his body and give him a proper burial.

== Wu Yong's poem ==
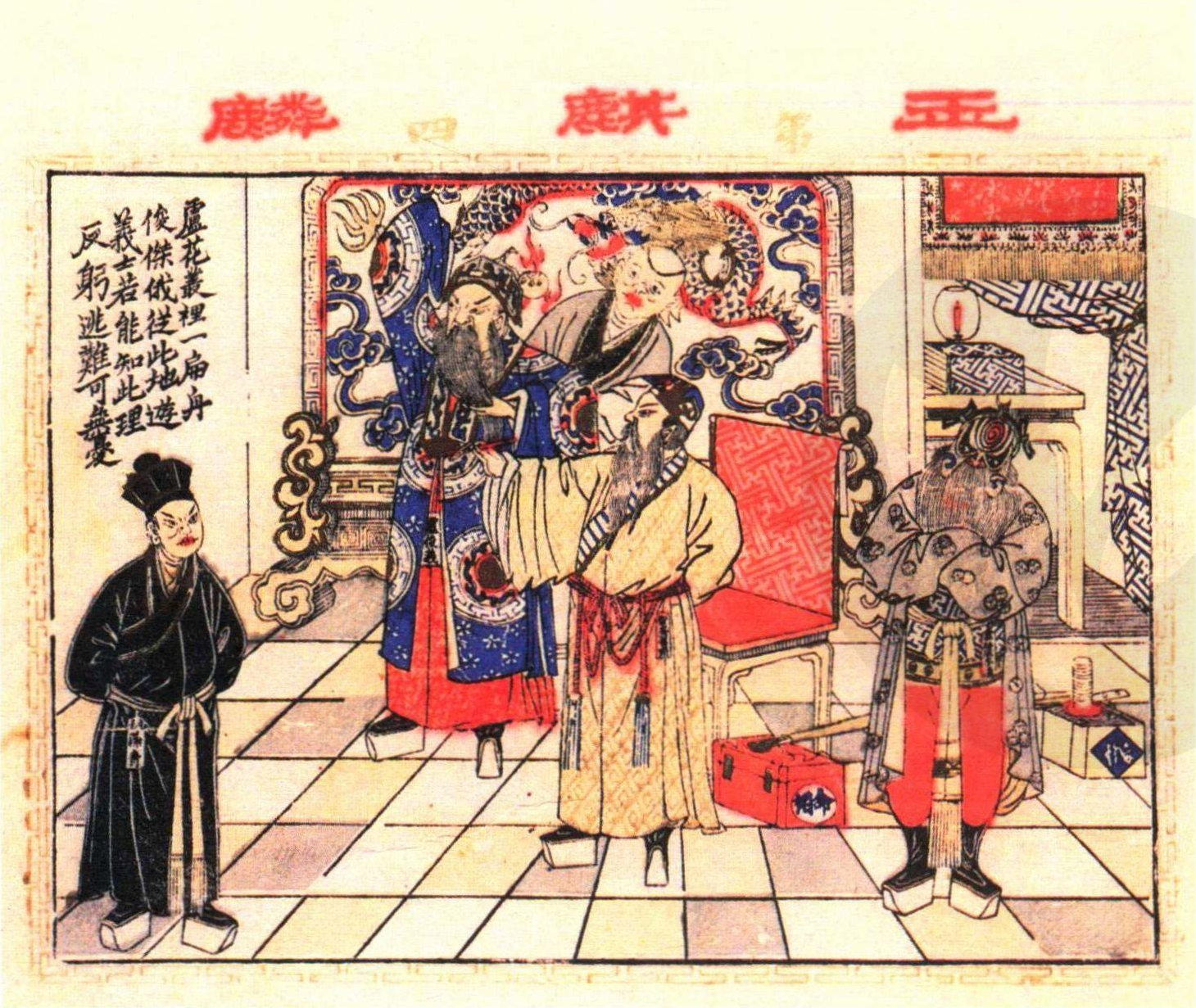
A Qing dynasty New Year picture depicting Wu Yong writing a poem on a wall in Lu Junyi's house.

The poem by Wu Yong is as follows:

**蘆**花叢裏一扁舟，

In a thicket of flowering reeds lies a small boat,

**俊**傑俄從此地遊。

A chivalrous man happens to pass by this place.

**義**士若能知此理，

If the virtuous man can attain this understanding,

**反**躬逃難可無憂。

He will have no worries about evading disaster.

The first Chinese character in each of the four lines (in bold) when combined reads "lu jun yi fan" (蘆俊義反), which means "Lu Junyi rebels". The lu in the poem is a homonym of the Lu in Lu Junyi's name. The poem is cited as proof that Lu Junyi has joined the outlaws.

== See also ==
- List of Water Margin minor characters#Lu Junyi's story for a list of supporting minor characters from Lu Junyi's story.
