= Cai Fu =

Fictional character in the Chinese classical novel Water Margin

- Water Margin character
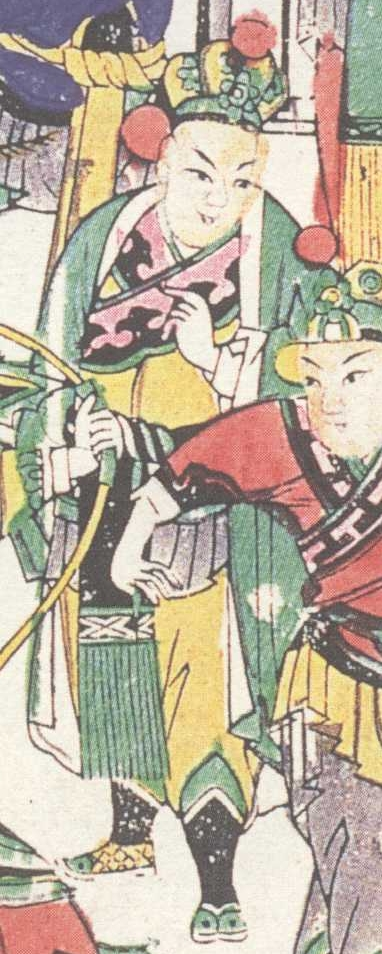
- a Qing dynasty illustration of Cai Fu
- First appearance: Chapter 62

In-universe information
- Nickname: "Iron Arm" 鐵臂膊
- Origin: jailer, executioner
- Designation: Chief Executioner of Liangshan
- Rank: 94th, Level Star (地平星) of the 72 Earthly Fiends
- Ancestral home / Place of origin: Daming Prefecture (present-day Daming County, Hebei)

Chinese names
- Simplified Chinese: 蔡福
- Traditional Chinese: 蔡福
- Pinyin: Cài Fú
- Wade–Giles: Ts'ai Fu

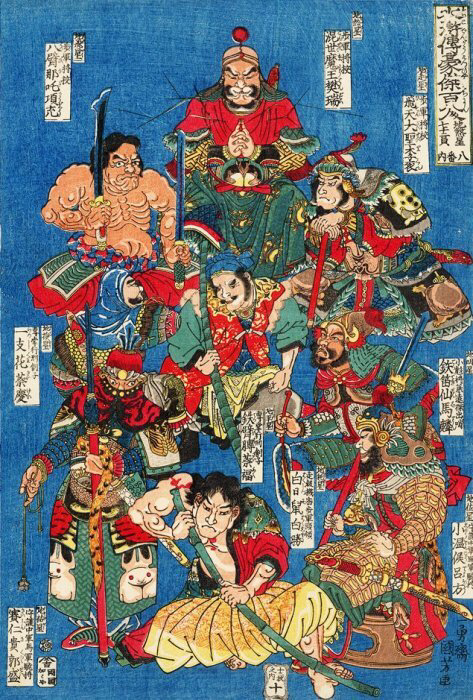
An illustration of nine of the 108 Heroes by Utagawa Kuniyoshi. Cai Fu is in the centre. The rest are (clockwise from top): Fan Rui, Li Gun, Ma Lin, Lü Fang, Bai Sheng, Guo Sheng, Cai Qing, and Xiang Chong.

Cai Fu is a fictional character in Water Margin, one of the Classic Chinese Novels. Nicknamed "Iron Arm", he ranks 94th among the 108 Heroes and 58th among the 72 Earthly Fiends.

== Background ==
Originally from Daming Prefecture (大名府; present-day Daming County, Hebei), Cai Fu and his younger brother Cai Qing work as jailers and executioners in the city's prison. He is nicknamed "Iron Arm" for his ability to behead convicts with one swing of the broadsword, giving them a quick and seemingly painless death.

== Becoming an outlaw ==
The Cai brothers are first introduced in the novel during Lu Junyi's story arc. After Lu Junyi is betrayed by his steward Li Gu and his unfaithful wife (who is having an affair with Li Gu), he is arrested and thrown into prison for consorting with the outlaws from Liangshan Marsh. In prison, Lu Junyi is subjected to torture and starvation, causing him to be weakened.

Li Gu bribes the Cai brothers to murder Lu Junyi in prison, but the brothers are counter-bribed by the nobleman Chai Jin, an ally of the Liangshan outlaws, to ensure that Lu is safe and well-cared for. Caught in a predicament as they do not wish to offend either side, the Cai brothers then bribe the judge overseeing Lu Junyi's case to sentence him to exile at Shamen Island (沙門島; present-day Changdao County, Shandong).

Dissatisfied with Lu Junyi's fate, Li Gu bribes the guards escorting Lu Junyi to Shamen Island to murder him along the way. However, Lu Junyi is saved by his faithful servant, Yan Qing. When Yan Qing temporarily leaves his master to look for food, a weakened Lu Junyi is recaptured by government forces and taken back to Daming Prefecture. Liang Shijie, the governor of Daming Prefecture, orders Lu Junyi to be executed in public. Cai Fu, who is assigned to be the executioner, is stunned when the Liangshan outlaw Shi Xiu shows up and storms the execution ground alone in an attempt to save Lu Junyi. Not wanting to antagonise the outlaws, the Cai brothers subtly loosen Lu Junyi's bonds and allow Shi Xiu to drag Lu Junyi away. However, Shi Xiu and Lu Junyi are eventually overwhelmed and captured by government forces.

This time, Liang Shijie decides to keep Lu Junyi and Shi Xiu alive as hostages in case the Liangshan outlaws attack Daming Prefecture. The Cai brothers ensure that the two men are well-taken care of in prison. The Liangshan outlaws ultimately show up to attack Daming Prefecture and manage to infiltrate the city during the Lantern Festival, causing widespread chaos. Chai Jin and other outlaws show up at the prison to force the Cai brothers to release Lu Junyi and Shi Xiu. Realising that it is pointless to resist, the brothers free the prisoners and join the outlaws as they return to Liangshan in triumph.

== Campaigns and death ==
Cai Fu is appointed as a chief executioner at Liangshan after the 108 Heroes are fully assembled. He participates in the campaigns against the Liao invaders and rebel forces in Song territory after the outlaws receive amnesty from Emperor Huizong.

During the final campaign against Fang La's rebel forces, Cai Fu is assigned to attack Qingxi County (清溪縣; present-day Chun'an County, Zhejiang). He is critically wounded in the battle and eventually succumbs to his wounds.
