= Naginata =

Type of Japanese polearm

Naginata (なぎなた, 薙刀)
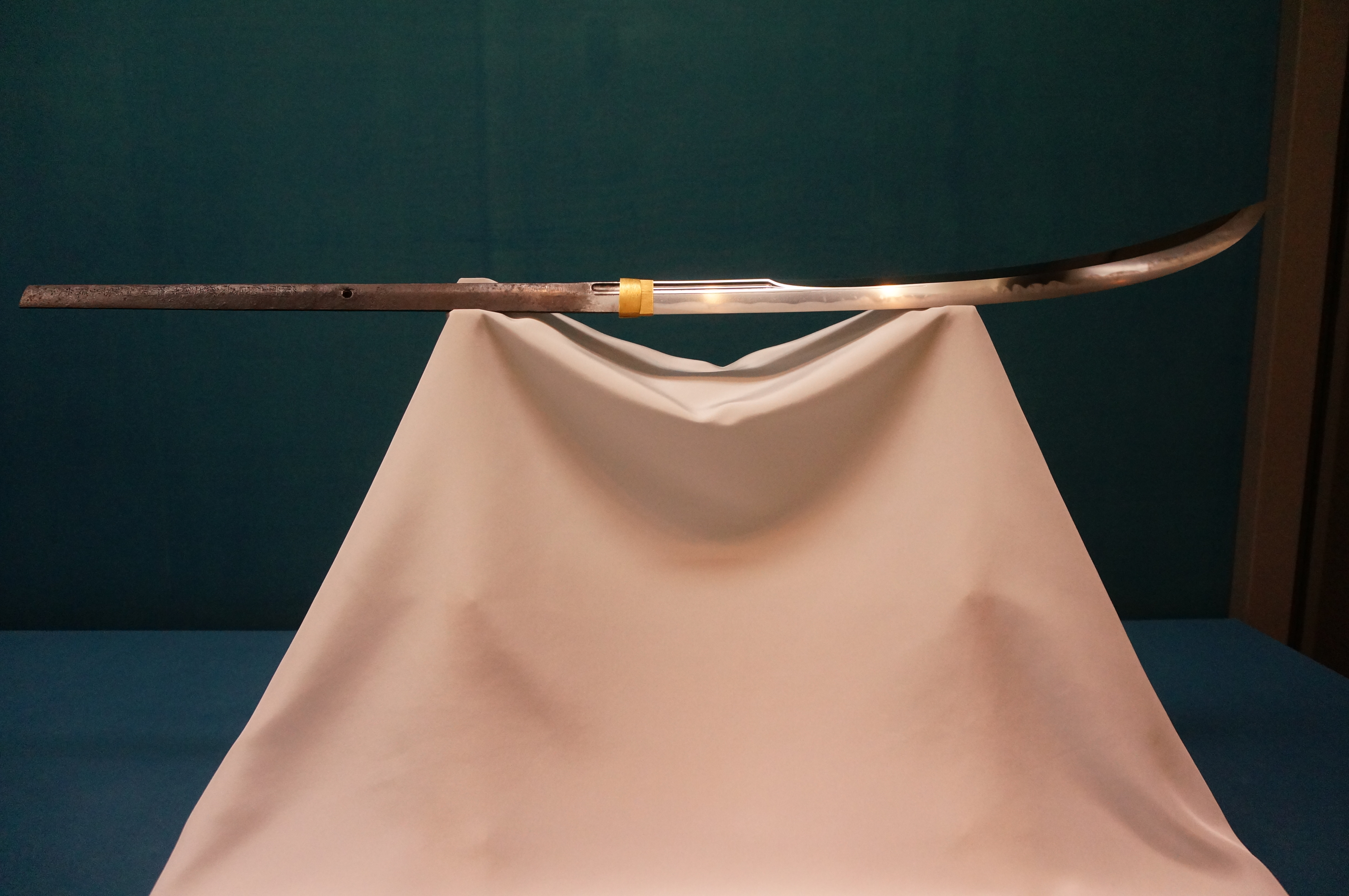
- A naginata blade forged by Osafune Katsumitsu. Muromachi period, 1503, Tokyo National Museum
- Type: Polearm
- Place of origin: Japan

Service history
- Used by: Samurai, Onna-musha, Naginatajutsu practitioners

Production history
- Produced: Since Heian period or Kamakura period

Specifications
- Mass: 650 grams (23 oz) and more
- Length: 205–260 centimetres (81–102 in)
- Blade length: 85–100 centimetres (33–39 in)
- Blade type: Curved, single-edged
- Hilt type: wood, horn, lacquer
- Scabbard/sheath: Lacquered wood

The naginata (なぎなた, 薙刀, lit. 'mowing sword') is a polearm and one of several varieties of traditionally made Japanese blades (nihontō). Naginata were originally used by the samurai class of feudal Japan, as well as by ashigaru (foot soldiers) and sōhei (warrior monks). The naginata is the iconic weapon of the onna-musha, a type of female warrior belonging to the Japanese nobility.

== Description ==
A naginata consists of a wooden or metal pole with a curved single-edged blade on the end; it is similar to the Chinese guan dao or the European glaive. Similar to the katana, naginata often have a round handguard (tsuba) between the blade and shaft, when mounted in a koshirae (furniture). The 30 to 60 cm (12 to 23.5 in) naginata blade is forged in the same manner as traditional Japanese swords. The blade has a long tang (nakago) which is inserted in the shaft.

The blade is removable and is secured by means of a wooden peg called mekugi (目釘) that passes through a hole (mekugi-ana) in both the tang and the shaft. The shaft ranges from 120 to 240 cm (47 to 94.5 in) in length and is oval shaped. The area of the shaft where the tang sits is the tachiuchi or tachiuke. The tachiuchi/tachiuke would be reinforced with metal rings (naginata dogane or semegane), and/or metal sleeves (sakawa) and wrapped with cord (san-dan maki). The end of the shaft has a heavy metal end cap (ishizuki or hirumaki). When not in use the blade would be covered with a wooden sheath.

== History ==
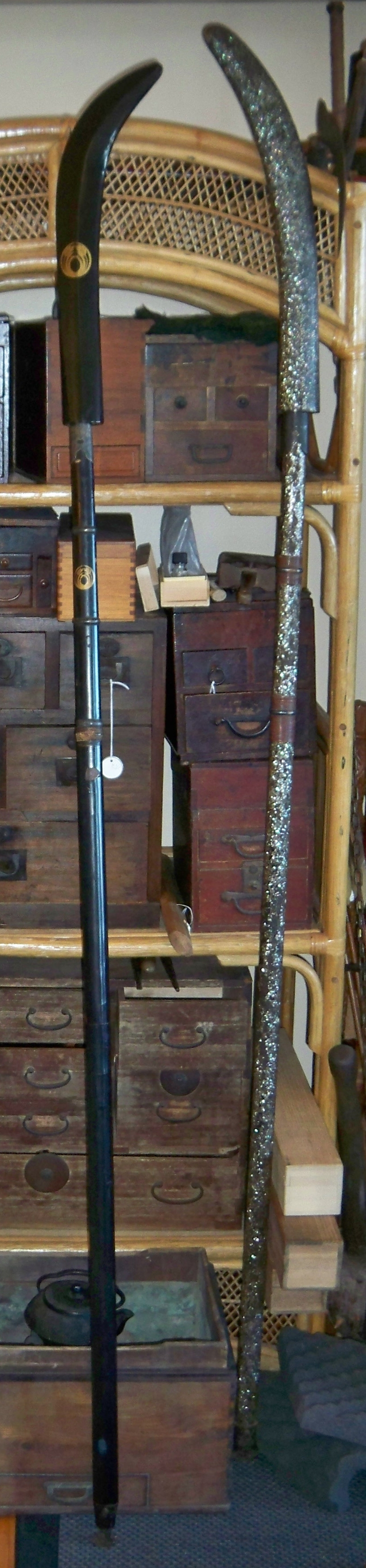
Mounting for naginata, Edo period

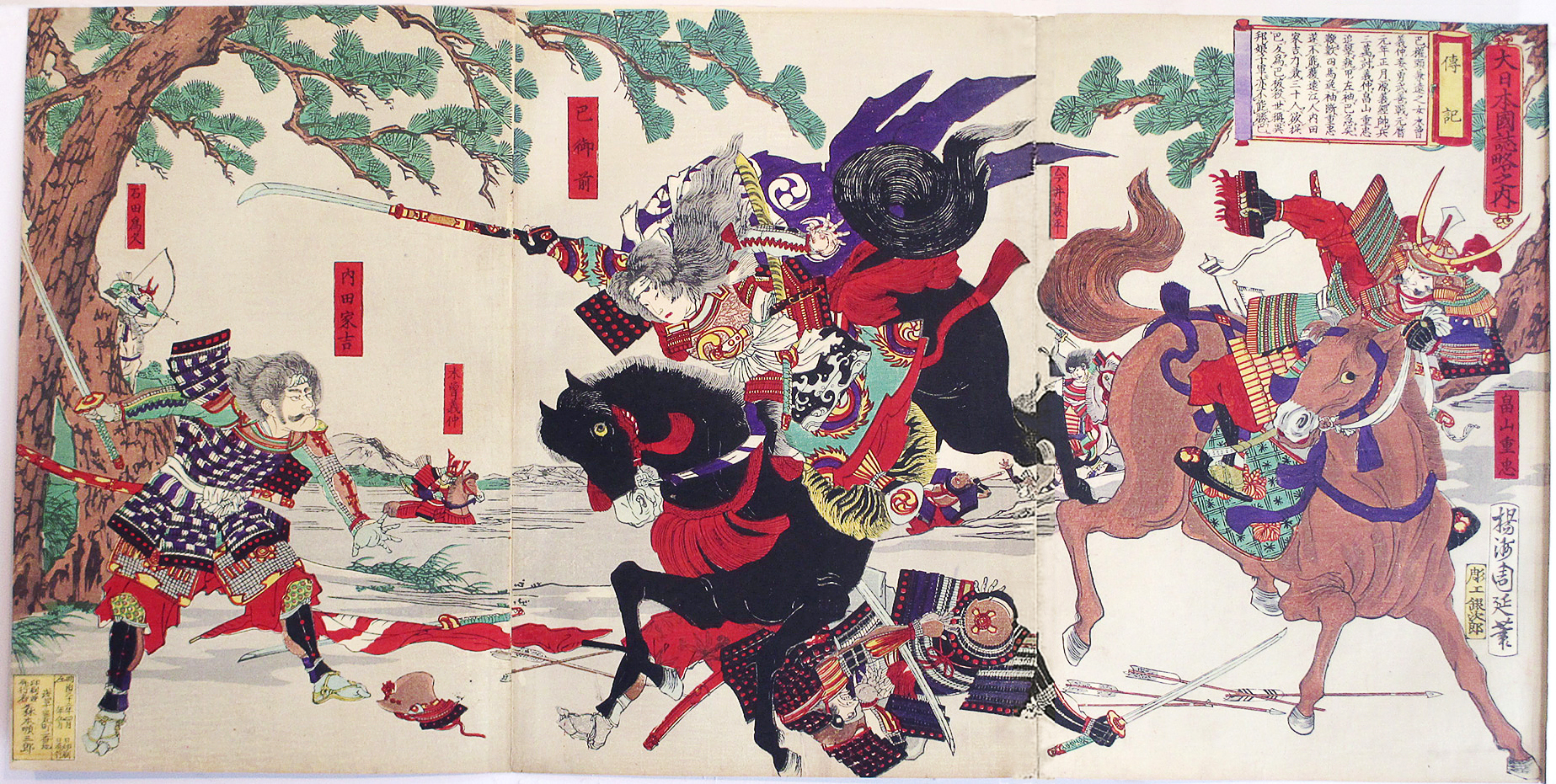
Tomoe Gozen, an "onna-musha", wields a naginata on horseback.

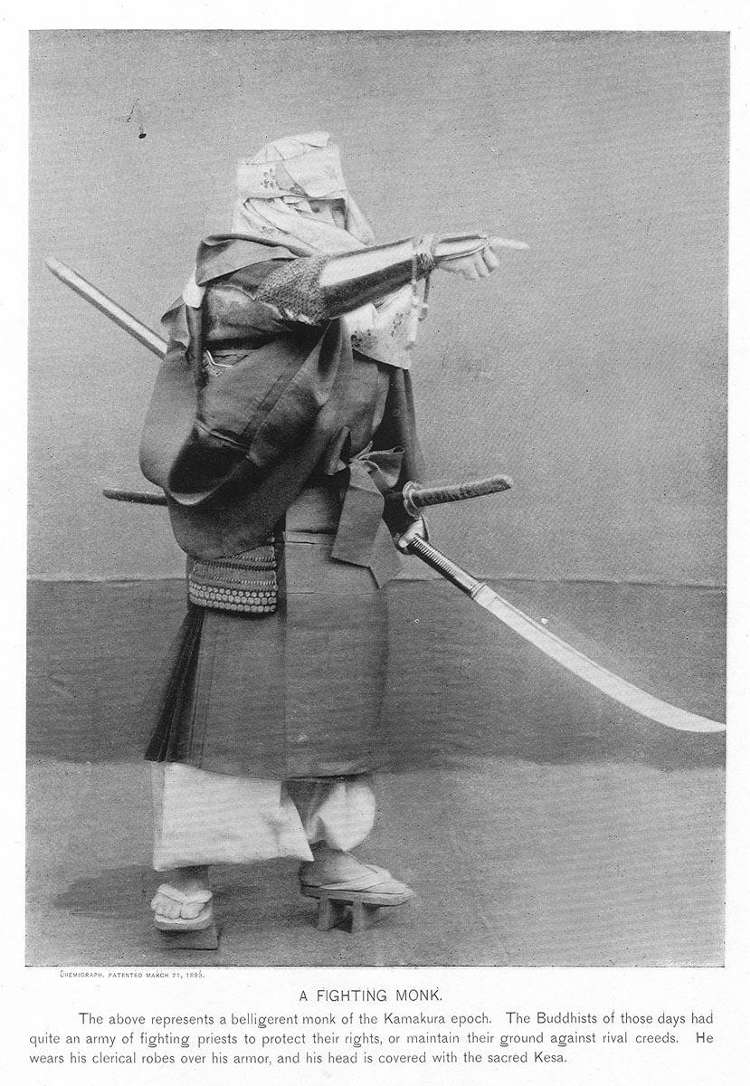
A Meiji-era depiction of a sōhei (warrior monk) with a naginata

It is assumed that the naginata was developed from an earlier weapon type of the later 1st millennium AD, the hoko yari. Another assumption is that the naginata was developed by lengthening the hilt of the tachi at the end of the Heian period, and it is not certain which theory is correct.

It is generally believed that naginata first appeared in the Heian period (794–1185). The term naginata first appeared in historical documents in the Heian period. The earliest clear references to naginata date from 1146. In Honchō Seiki compiled from 1150 to 1159 in the late Heian period, it is recorded that Minamoto no Tsunemitsu mentioned that his weapon was a naginata.

In the early Heian period, battles were mainly fought using yumi (longbow) on horseback, but in the late Heian period, battles on foot began to increase and naginata also came to be used on the battlefield. The naginata was appreciated because it was a weapon that could maintain an optimum distance from the enemy in close combat. During the Genpei War (1180–1185), in which the Taira clan was pitted against the Minamoto clan, the naginata rose to a position of particularly high esteem, being regarded as an extremely effective weapon by warriors. The Tale of the Heike, which records the Genpei War, there are descriptions such as ō naginata (lit. big naginata) and ko naginata (lit. little naginata), which show that naginata of various lengths were used. The naginata proved excellent at dismounting cavalry and disabling riders. The widespread adoption of the naginata as a battlefield weapon forced the introduction of greaves as a part of Japanese armor. Ōyamazumi Shrine houses two naginata that are said to have been dedicated by Tomoe Gozen and Benkei at the end of the Heian period and they are designated as Important Cultural Property.

However, according to Karl Friday, there were various notations for naginata in the Heian period and the earliest physical evidence for naginata was in the middle of the Kamakura period, so there is a theory that says when they first appeared is unclear. Earlier 10th through 12th century sources refer to "long swords" that while a common medieval term or orthography for naginata, could also simply be referring to conventional swords; one source describes a naginata being drawn with the verb nuku (抜く), commonly associated with swords, rather than hazusu (外す), the verb otherwise used in medieval texts for unsheathing naginata. Some 11th and 12th century mentions of hoko may actually have been referring to naginata. The commonly assumed association of the naginata and the sōhei is also unclear. Artwork from the late-13th and 14th centuries depict the sōhei with naginata but do not appear to place any special significance to it: the weapons appear as just one of a number of others carried by the monks, and are used by samurai and commoners as well. Depictions of naginata-armed sōhei in earlier periods were created centuries after the fact, and are likely using the naginata as a symbol to distinguish the sōhei from other warriors, rather than giving an accurate portrayal of the events.

After the Ōnin War (1467–1477) in the Muromachi period, large-scale group battles started in which mobilized ashigaru (foot soldiers) fought on foot and in close quarters, and yari (spear), yumi (longbow), and tanegashima (Japanese matchlock) became the main weapons. This made naginata and tachi obsolete on the battlefield, and they were often replaced with the nagamaki and short, lightweight katana.

In the Edo period (1603–1867), the hilts of naginata were often cut off and made into katana or wakizashi (short sword). This practice of cutting off the hilt of an ōdachi, tachi, naginata, or nagamaki and remaking it into a shorter katana or wakizashi due to changes in tactics is called suriage (磨上げ) and was common in Japan at the time. In Japan there is a saying about swords: "No sword made by modifying a naginata or a nagamaki is dull in cutting" (薙刀（長巻）直しに鈍刀なし). The meaning of this saying is that naginata and nagamaki are equipment for actual combat, not works of art or offerings to the kami, and that the sharpness and durability of swords made from their modifications have been proven on the battlefield.

In the peaceful Edo period, weapons' value as battlefield weapons became diminished and their value for martial arts and self-defense rose. The naginata was accepted as a status symbol and self-defense weapon for women of nobility, resulting in the image that "the Naginata is the main weapon used by women".

In the Meiji era, it gained popularity along sword martial arts. From the Taisho era to the post-War era, the naginata became popular as a martial art for women, mainly due to the influence of government policies.

Although associated with considerably smaller numbers of practitioners, a number of "koryu bujutsu" systems (traditional martial arts) which include older and more combative forms of naginatajutsu remain existent, including Suio Ryu, Araki Ryu, Tendo Ryu, Jikishinkage ryu, Higo Koryu, Tenshin Shoden Katori Shinto Ryu, Toda-ha Buko Ryu, and Yoshin ryu, some of which have authorized representatives outside Japan.

== Contemporary construction ==
In contemporary naginatajutsu, two types of practice naginata are in common use.

The naginata used in atarashii naginata (新しいなぎなた), the shiai-yo (試合場), has an oak shaft and a bamboo "blade" (habu). It is used for practice, forms competitions, and sparring. It is between 210 and 225 cm (83 and 89 in) in length and must weigh over 650 g (23 oz). The "blade" is replaceable. They are often broken or damaged during sparring and can be quickly replaced, being attached to the shaft with tape.

The naginata used by koryū practitioners has an oak shaft and blade, carved from a single piece of wood, and may incorporate a disc-shaped guard (tsuba). It is called a kihon-yo.

== Contemporary usage ==
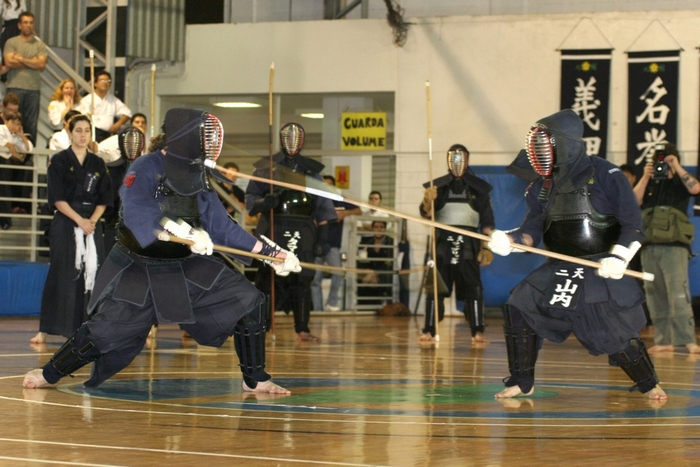
A naginatajutsu tournament in Brazil, organised by the Confederação Brasileira de Kobudo

Naginata can be used to batter, stab, or hook an opponent, but due to their relatively balanced center of mass, are often spun and turned to proscribe a large radius of reach. The curved blade provides a long cutting surface without increasing the overall length of the weapon.

Historically, the naginata was often used by foot soldiers to create space on the battlefield. They have several situational advantages over a sword. Their reach is longer, allowing the wielder to keep out of the reach of opponents. The weight of the weapon gave power to strikes and cuts, even though the weight of the weapon is usually thought of as a disadvantage. The weight at the end of the shaft (ishizuki), and the shaft itself (ebu) can be used offensively and defensively.

The martial art of wielding the naginata is known as naginatajutsu. Most naginata practice today is in a modernised form, a gendai budō called atarashii Naginata ("new Naginata"), which is organized into regional, national, and international federations, who hold competitions and award ranks. Use of the naginata is also taught within the Bujinkan and in some koryū schools such as Suio Ryu and Tendō-ryū.

Naginata practitioners wear an uwagi, obi, and hakama, similar to that worn by kendo practitioners, although the uwagi is generally white. For sparring, armor known as bōgu is worn. Bōgu for naginatajutsu adds shin guards (脛当, sune-ate) and the gloves (小手, kote) have a singulated index finger, unlike the mitten-style gloves used for kendo.

== Gallery ==
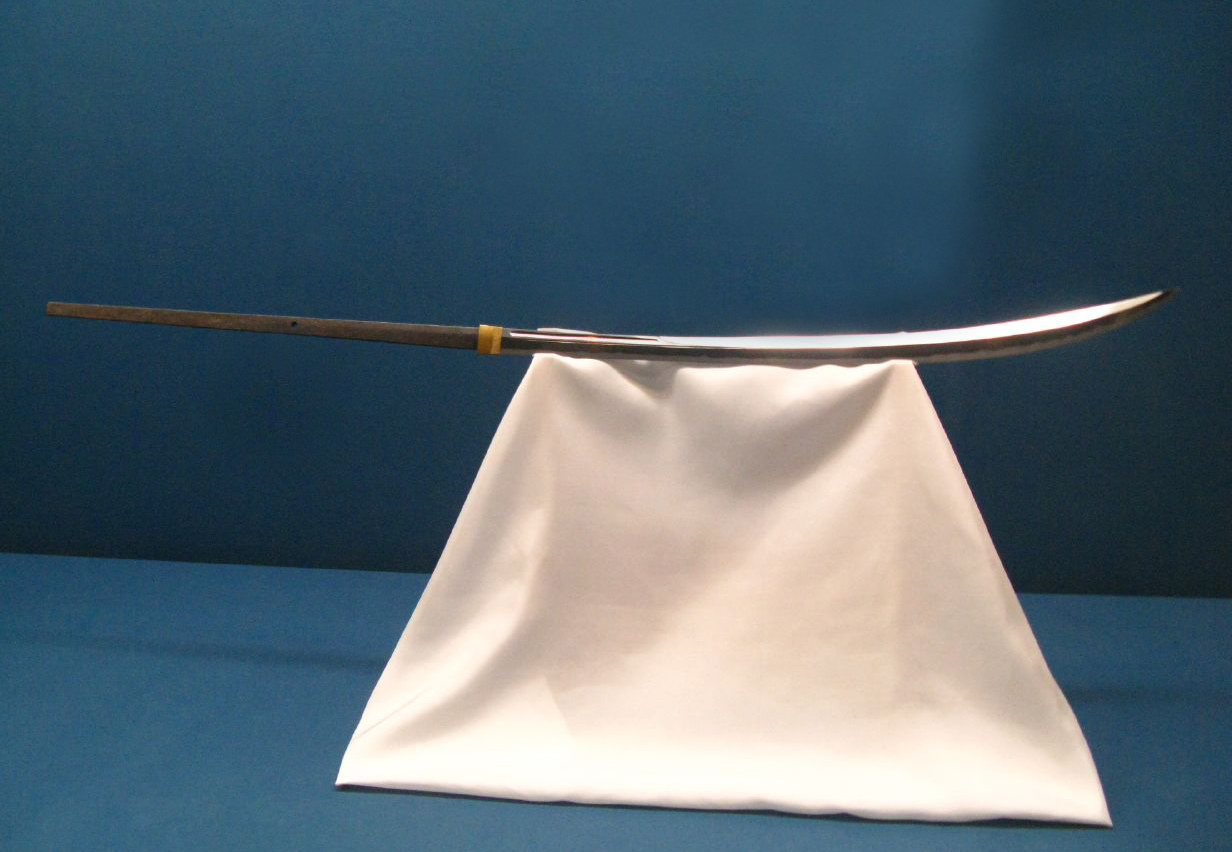
Antique naginata blade, Tokyo National Museum

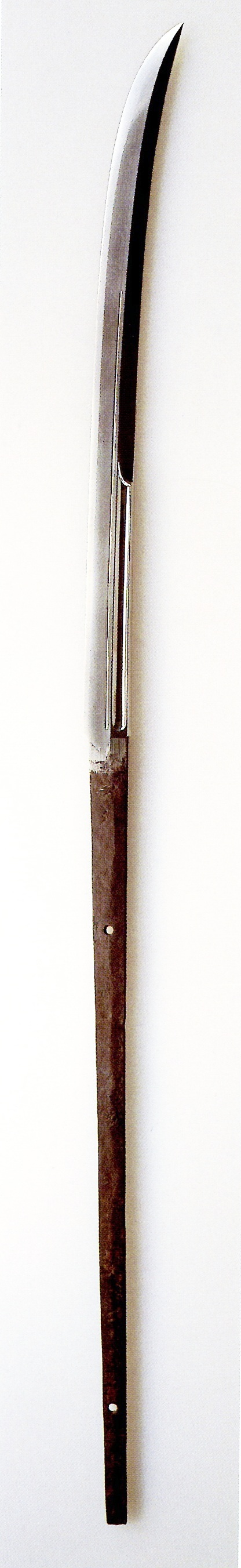
A naginata made in the Kamakura period

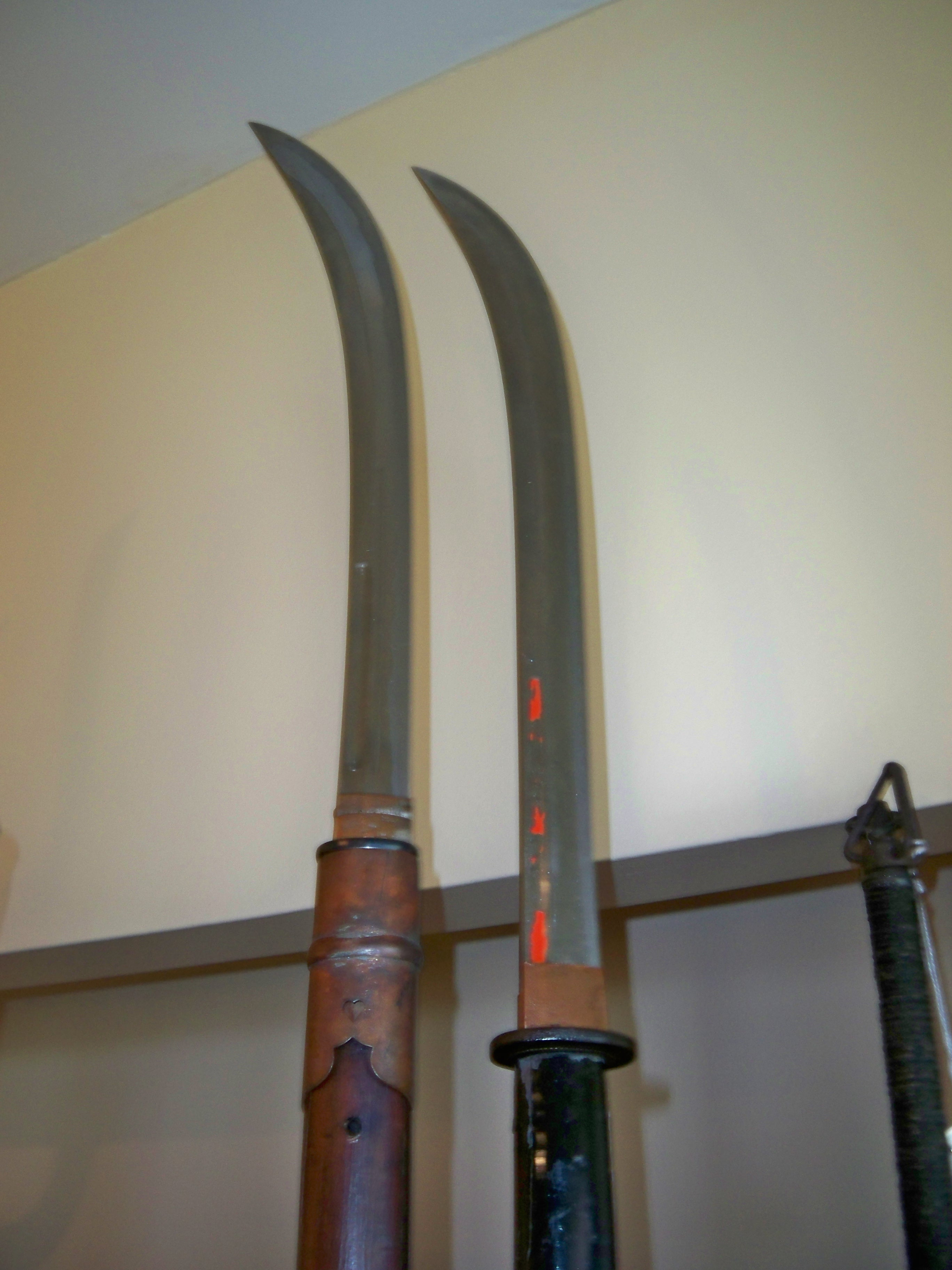
Two naginata

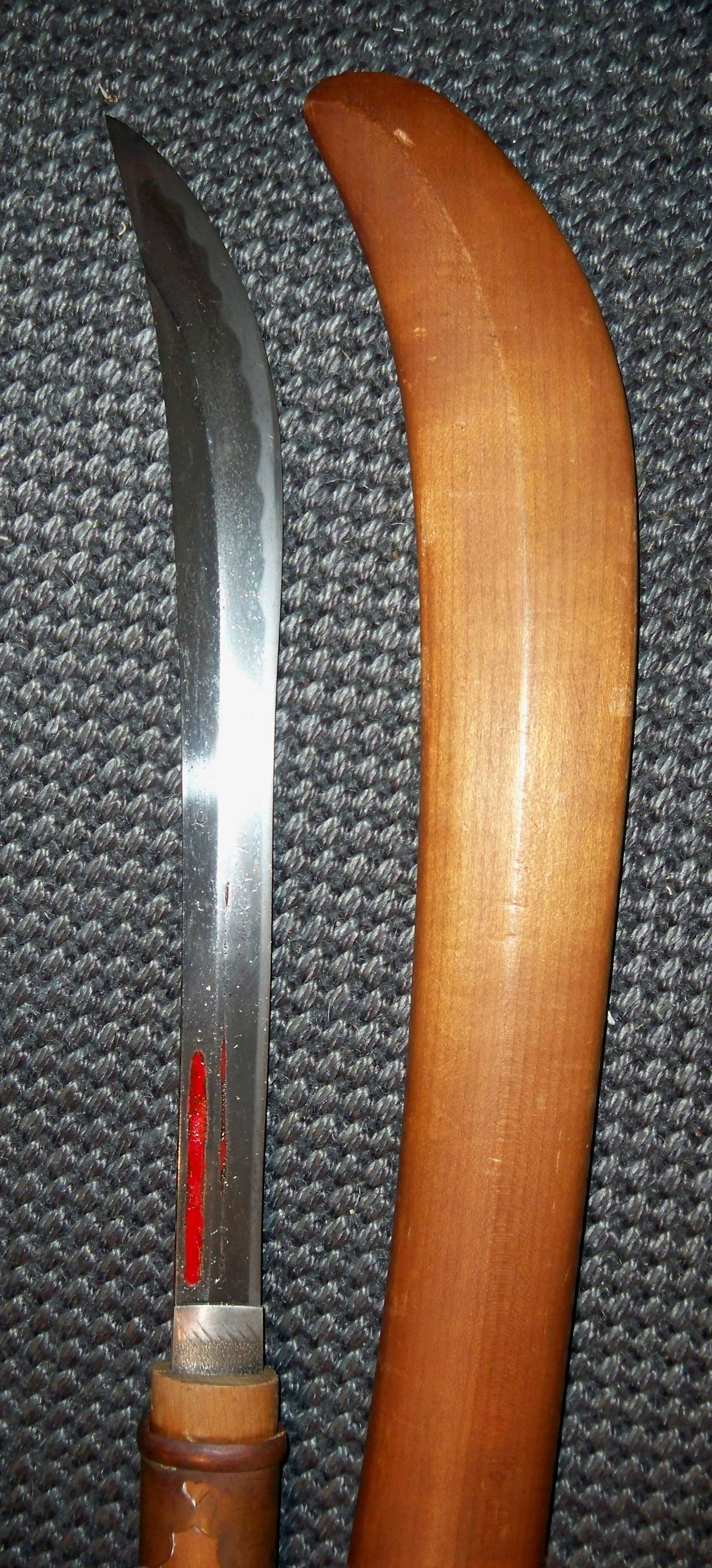
Naginata blade and a saya

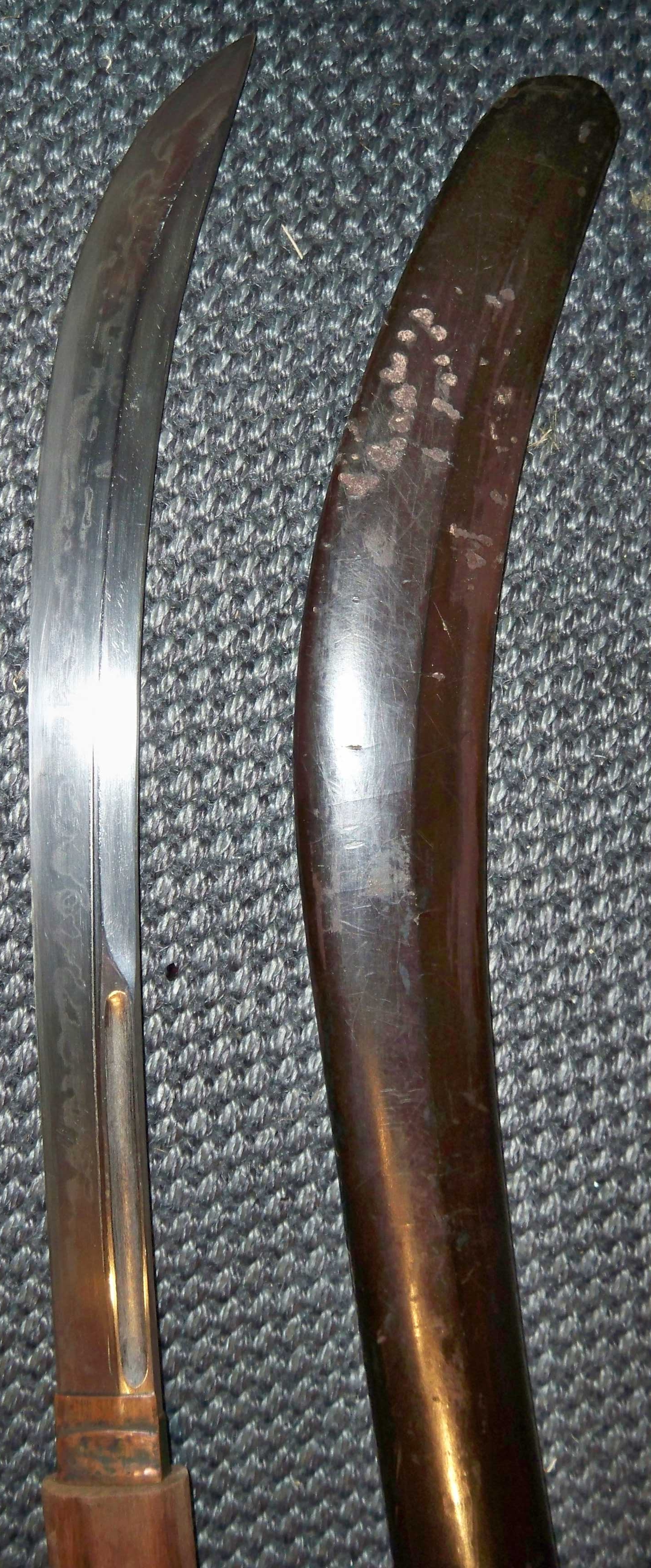

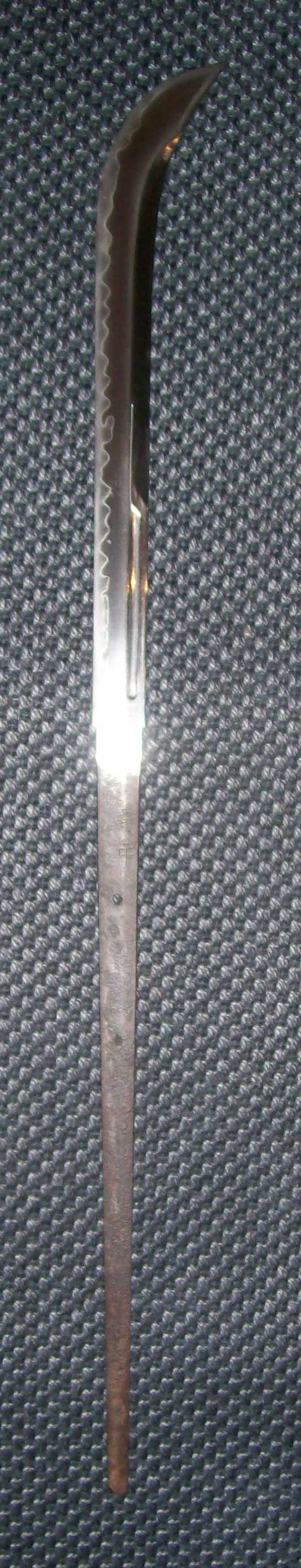

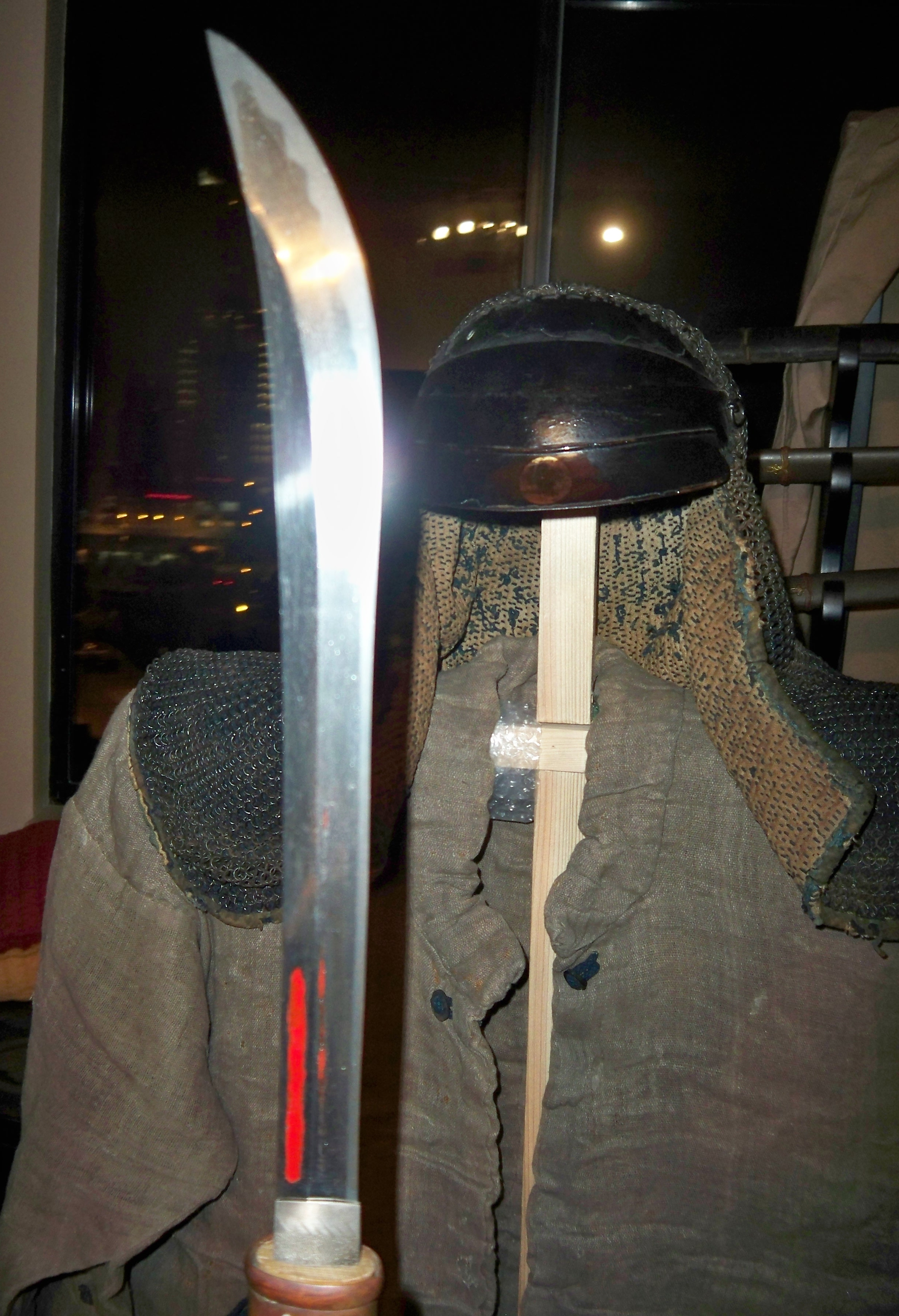

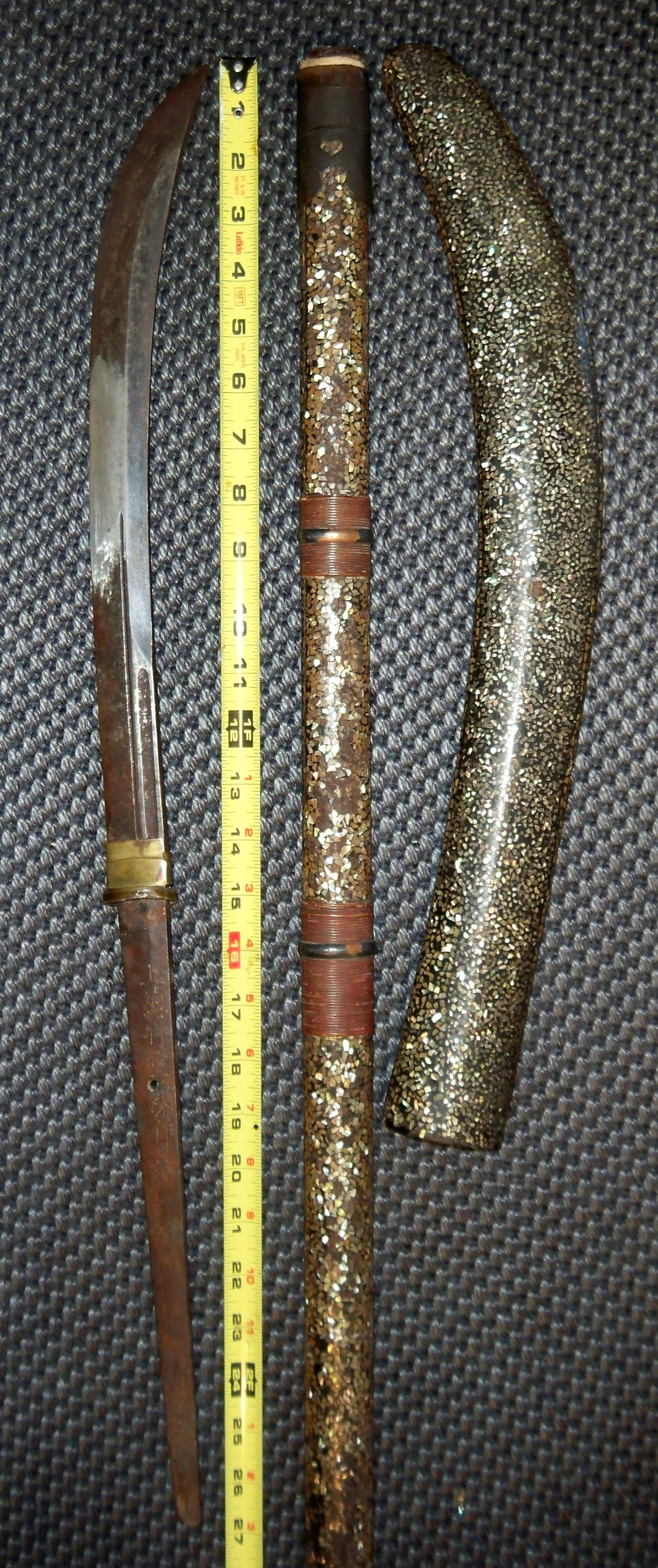

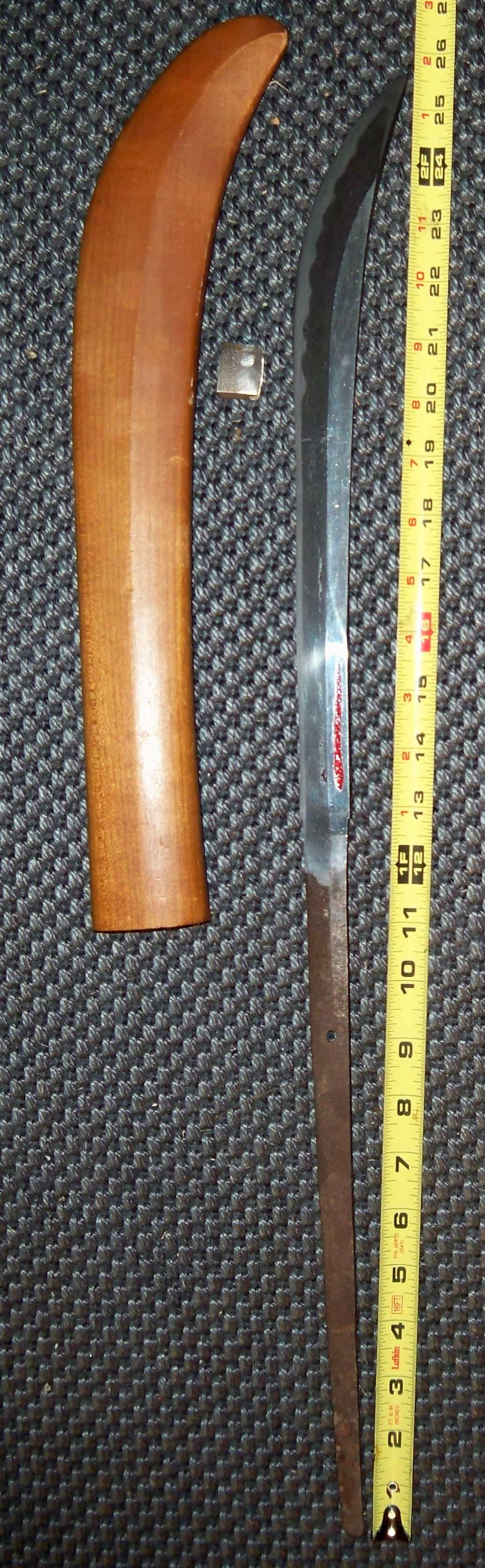

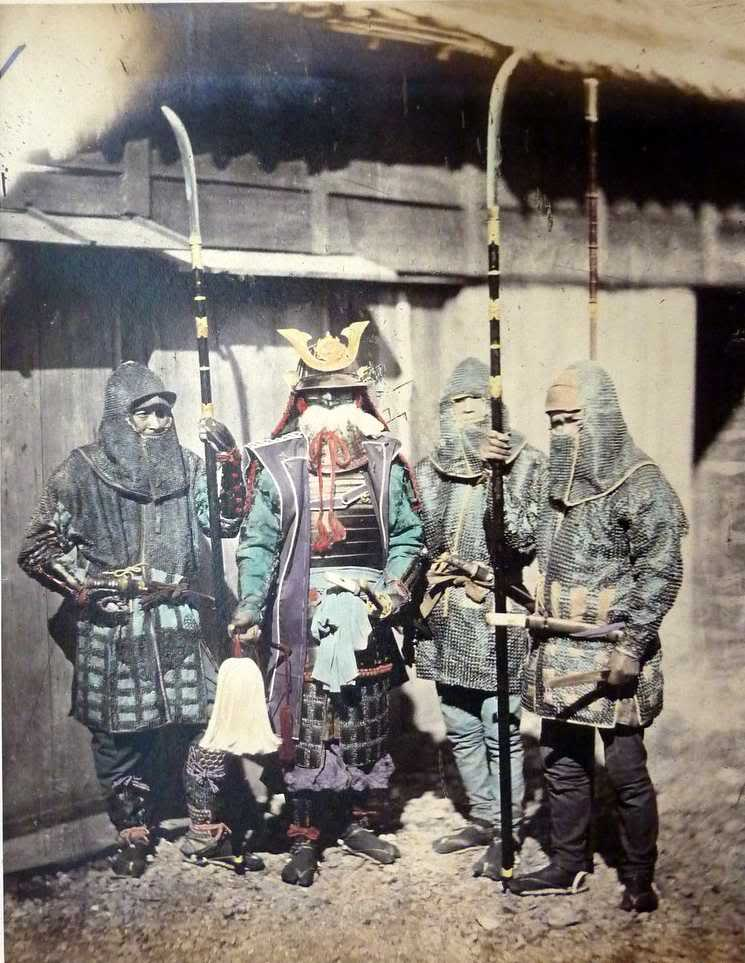
1870 photograph of samurai and retainers wearing mail armour and holding naginata

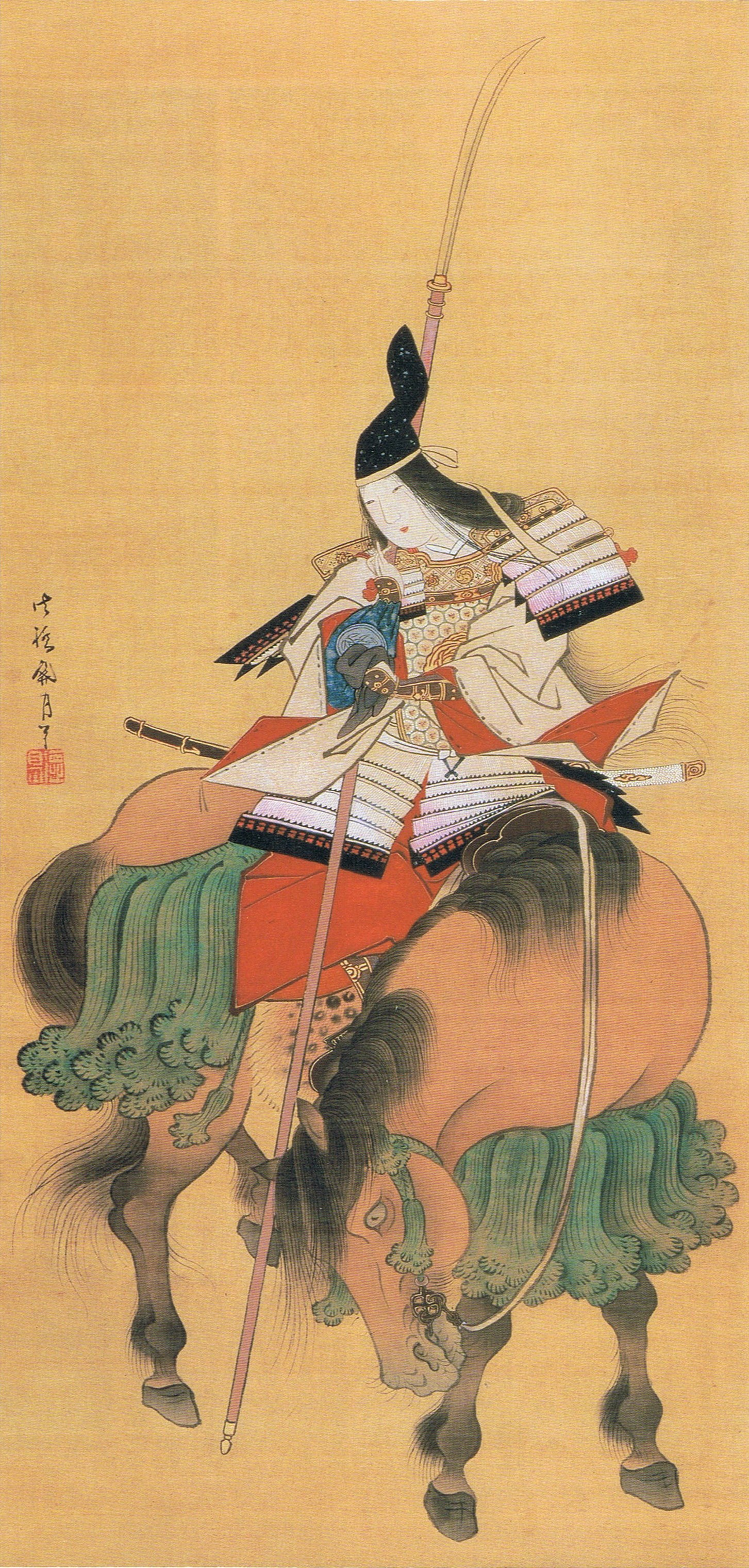
The onna-musha Tomoe Gozen on horseback with a naginata

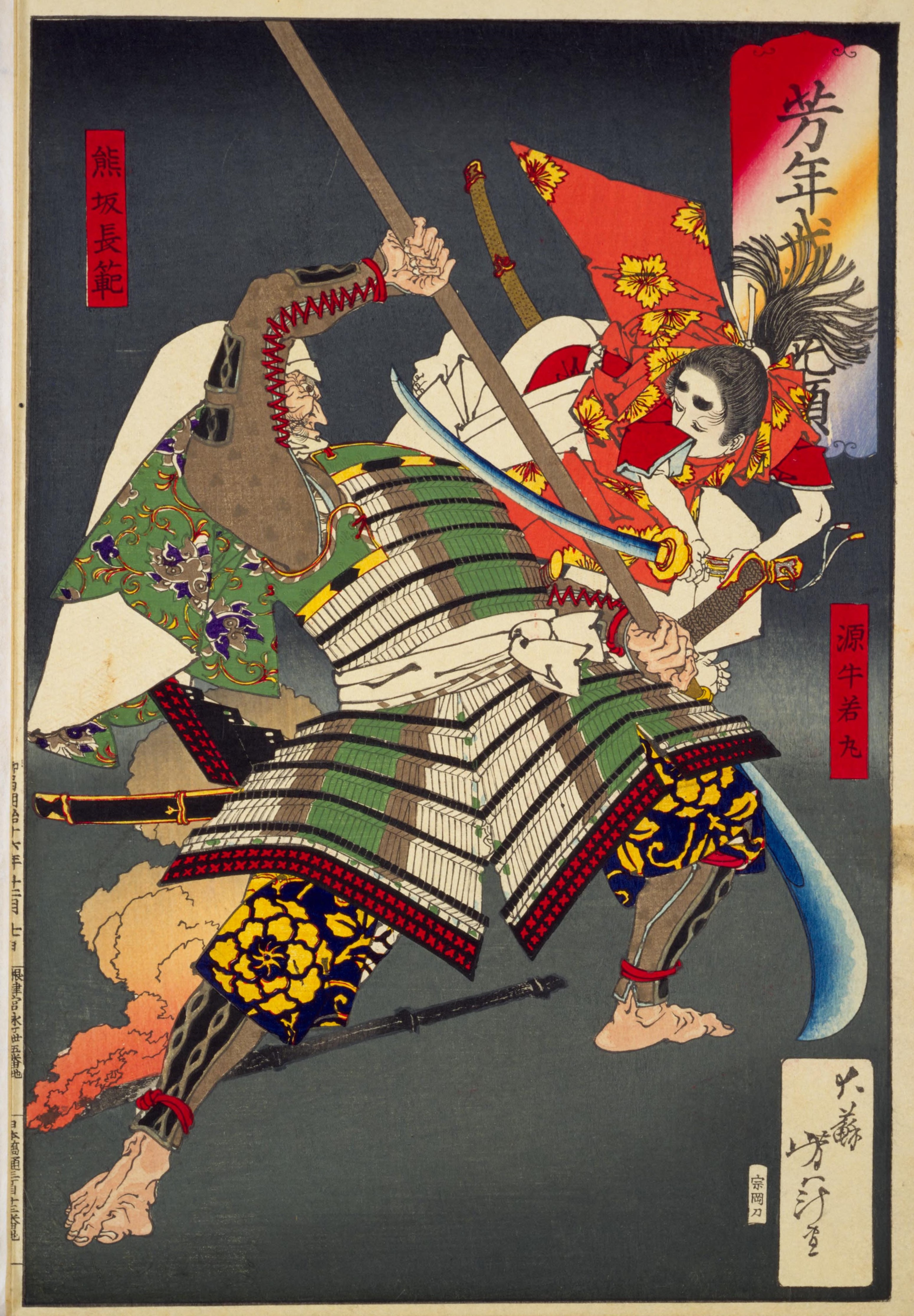
A duel between Ushiwakamaru, who uses a tachi, and Kumasaka Chohan, a bandit leader who uses a naginata. From Yoshitoshi's ukiyo-e series, Warriors Trembling with Courage.

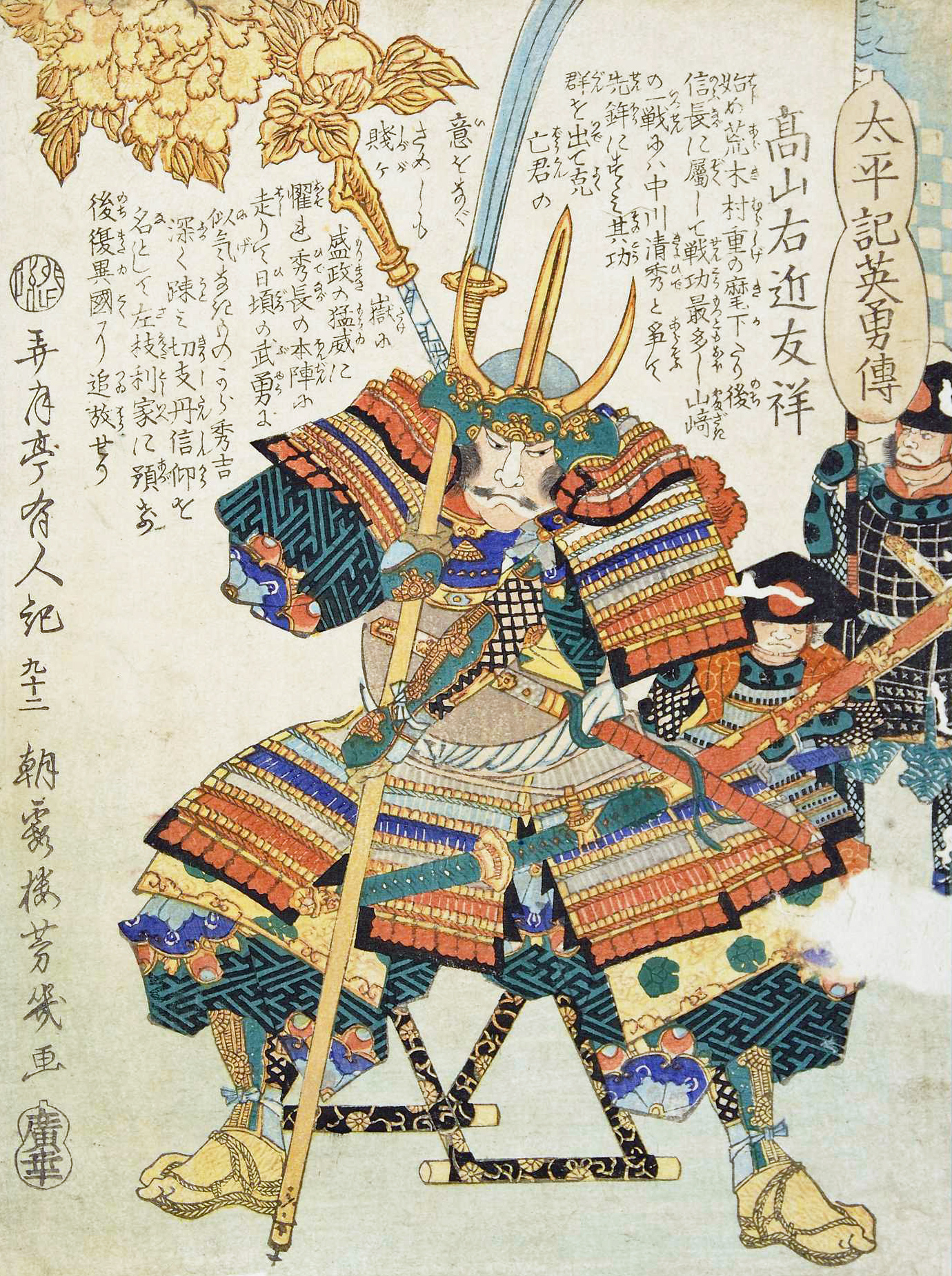
Samurai Takayama Ukon with a naginata. Ukiyo-e printed by Utagawa Yoshiiku (1867).

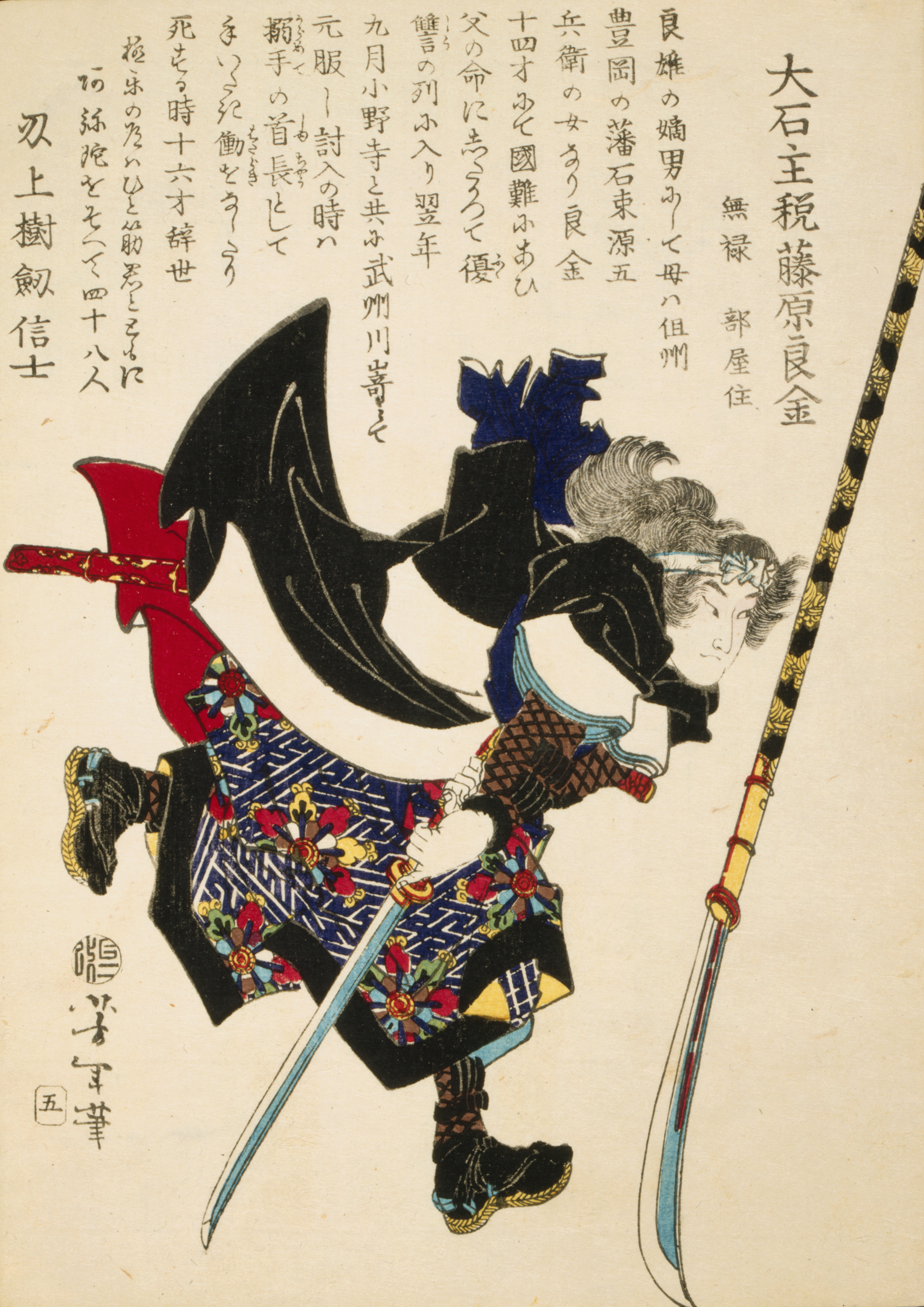
A ronin with a katana and naginata

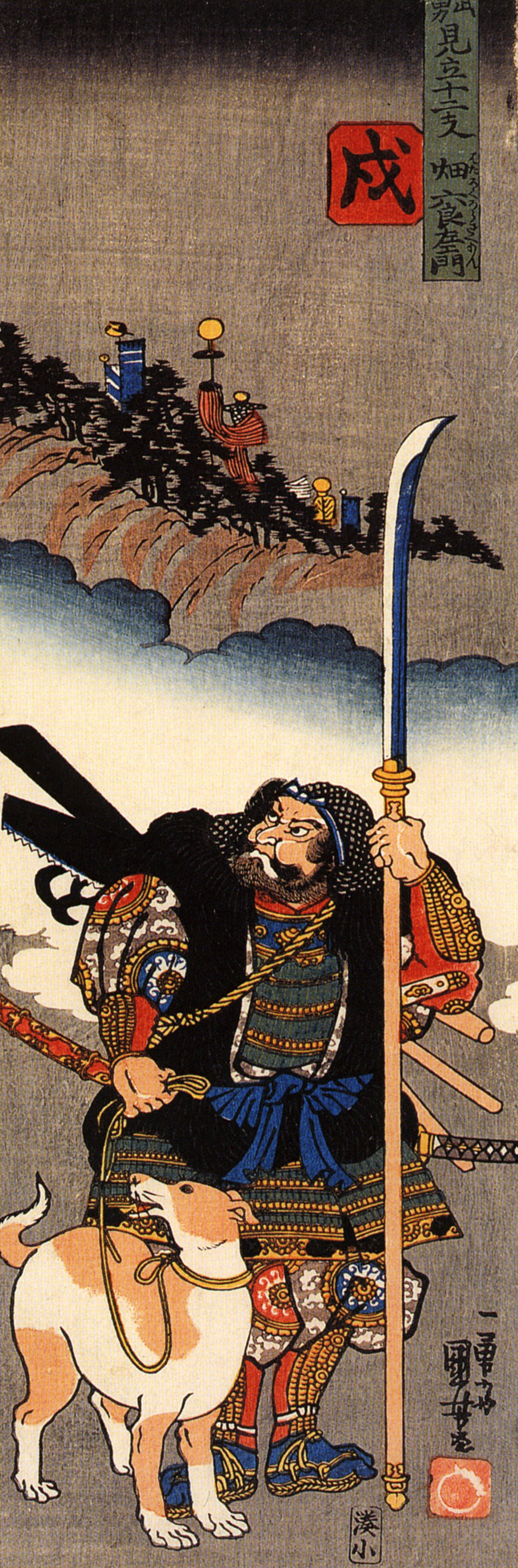
Depiction of samurai Hata Rokurozaemon carrying a naginata

== See also ==
- Bisento
- Dadao
- Glaive
- Guandao
- Halberd
- Podao
- Woldo

== Sources ==
- Clive Sinclair (2004): Samurai: The Weapons and Spirit of the Japanese Warrior. Guilford, CT: Lyons Press. p. 110. ISBN 978-1-59228-720-8. OCLC 62121288.
- George Cameron Stone, Donald J. LaRocca (1999): A Glossary of the Construction, Decoration and Use of Arms and Armor: In All Countries and in All Times. Mineola, N.Y.: Dover Publications. p. 463f. ISBN 978-0-486-40726-5 (reprint). OCLC 42038167.
