= War of God =

1976 Taiwanese-Hong Kong film by Chen Hung-min

- Directed by: Chen Hung-min
- Screenplay by: Lin Ching-Chieh
- Produced by: Fu Ching-Hua
- Starring: Yu Ming Lun; Tse Ling-Ling; Cindy Tang Hsin; Yu-Hsin Chen
- Cinematography: Shen Chung; Jui-Chang Huang; Wen Hsiung Lai; Tzu-Jung Lin
- Edited by: Fang-Jen Nan
- Music by: Mou-Shan Huang
- Production companies: Hsing Hua Film Production Company; Tai Ji Film Company
- Distributed by: Cathay Organisation (USA, Singapore)
- Release dates: July 24, 1976 (Taiwan); October 23, 1978 (United States)
- Running time: 91 minutes
- Country: Taiwan
- Language: Taiwanese

War of God or Gwan Gung Vs Aliens is a 1976 science fantasy film directed by Chen Hung-min and produced by Hsing Hua Film Production Company. The film is a Taiwanese-Hong Kong co-production. Special effects coordinator Koichi Takano provided effects for the film.

== Plot ==
Mr. Chao is an elderly blind sculptor who is building a statue depicting the mythological deity Guan Yu. When the statue is completed, a gigantic version of Guan Yu appears to fight giant Martians, who attacked Hong Kong, before he destroys them with his Green Dragon Crescent Blade.

== Cast ==
- Yu Ming Lun as Chao Chun
- Tse Ling-Ling as Li Yu
- Cindy Tang Hsin as Chun Lan
- Yu-Hsin Chen as Mr. Chao
- Fei Lung as Guan Yu
