= Green Dragon Crescent Blade =

Legendary Chinese weapon

- Traditional Chinese: 靑龍偃月刀
- Simplified Chinese: 青龙偃月刀
Transcriptions
Standard Mandarin
- Hanyu Pinyin: Qīnglóng yǎn yuè dāo
- IPA: [tɕʰíŋ.lʊ̌ŋ jɛ̀n.ɥê.táʊ]
Yue: Cantonese
- Yale Romanization: Chīng lùhng yín yuht dōu
- Jyutping: Cing^{1} lung^{4} jin^{2} jyut^{6} dou^{1}
- IPA: [tsʰɪŋ˥ lʊŋ˩ jin˧˥ jyt̚˨ tɔw˥]

Frost Fair Blade
- Traditional Chinese: 冷豔鋸
- Simplified Chinese: 冷艳锯
Transcriptions
Standard Mandarin
- Hanyu Pinyin: Lěngyàn jù
- IPA: [lə̀ŋ.jɛ̂n tɕû]
Yue: Cantonese
- Yale Romanization: Láahng yihm geui
- Jyutping: Laang^{5} jim^{6} geoi^{3}
- IPA: [laŋ˩˧ jim˨ kɵɥ˧]

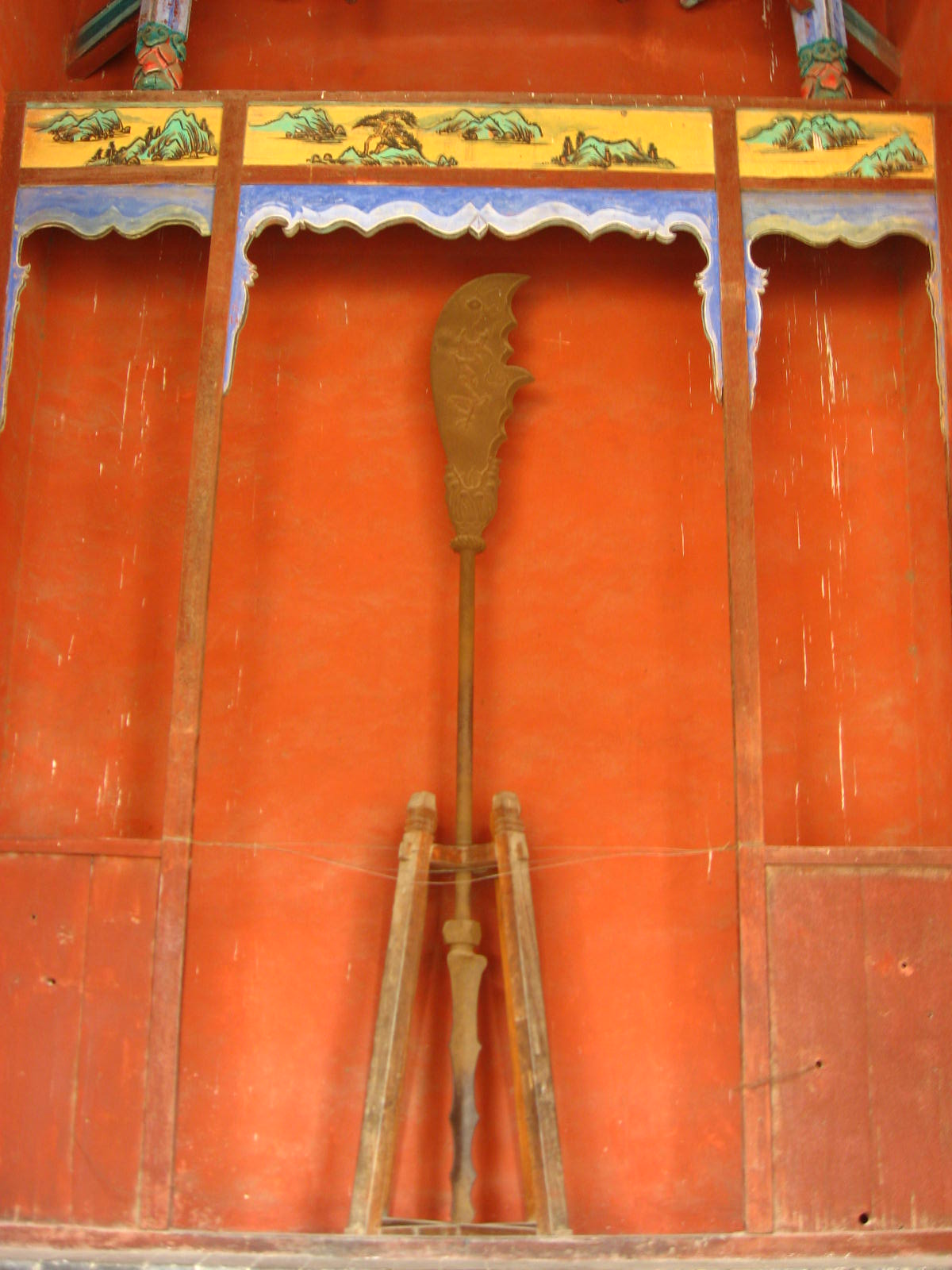
A depiction of the Green Dragon Crescent Blade in Xiezhou Guandi Temple, Yuncheng

The Green Dragon Crescent Blade (Chinese: 靑龍偃月刀) is a legendary weapon wielded by the Chinese general Guan Yu in the 14th-century historical novel Romance of the Three Kingdoms. It is a guandao, a type of traditional Chinese weapon.

It is also sometimes referred to as the Frost Fair Blade (冷豔鋸), from the idea that during a battle in the snow, the blade continuously had blood on it; the blood froze and made a layer of frost on the blade.

== In Romance of the Three Kingdoms ==
In the 3rd-century historical novel Romance of the Three Kingdoms, the blade is forged by a local blacksmith using steel sponsored by Zhang Shiping (張世平), a merchant sympathetic to Liu Bei's cause. When Guan Yu meets his end in 219, the blade is given to Pan Zhang by Sun Quan for his role in capturing Guan Yu. During the Battle of Yiling, Guan Yu's son Guan Xing kills Pan Zhang when the latter is stunned by a vision of Guan Yu's spirit. Guan Xing then takes back the Green Dragon Crescent Blade and later passes it down the generations from father to son in the Guan family.

== Historical validity ==
It is highly questionable whether Guan Yu actually wielded the Green Dragon or whether it was merely part of the myths surrounding him. Valid historical texts from his time period made no mention of him or anyone wielding a similar weapon. Because the guandao was known not to be widely used until the Song dynasty, there is some doubt as to whether the guandao existed during Guan Yu's time. The guandao may not have been very widely used because it was both difficult to wield and heavy (Guan Yu, reportedly, was able to wield it with agility with just one hand, while most people would have trouble using it effectively even with both hands). However, this may be due to the legend regarding the weight surrounding the blade, whereas in reality, it was much lighter.

According to Chapter 1 of the Romance of the Three Kingdoms, the Green Dragon Crescent Blade was said to weigh 82 catties. During the Eastern Han dynasty and Three Kingdoms periods, one catty was approximately 220 g (7.8 oz), so 82 catties would have been approximately 18 kg (40 lb). A weapon weighing about 44 kg (97 lb), purported to be the Green Dragon Crescent Blade, is on display at the Purple Cloud Temple in China today.

== Rumored origins ==
Legend says that Guan Yu invented the guandao. He had it forged after he met Liu Bei and Zhang Fei but before he made the Oath of the Peach Garden.

== See also ==
- Guandao
- Weapons and armor in Chinese mythology
- Serpent spear
- Fangtian Ji
