= Guandao =

Type of Chinese polearm

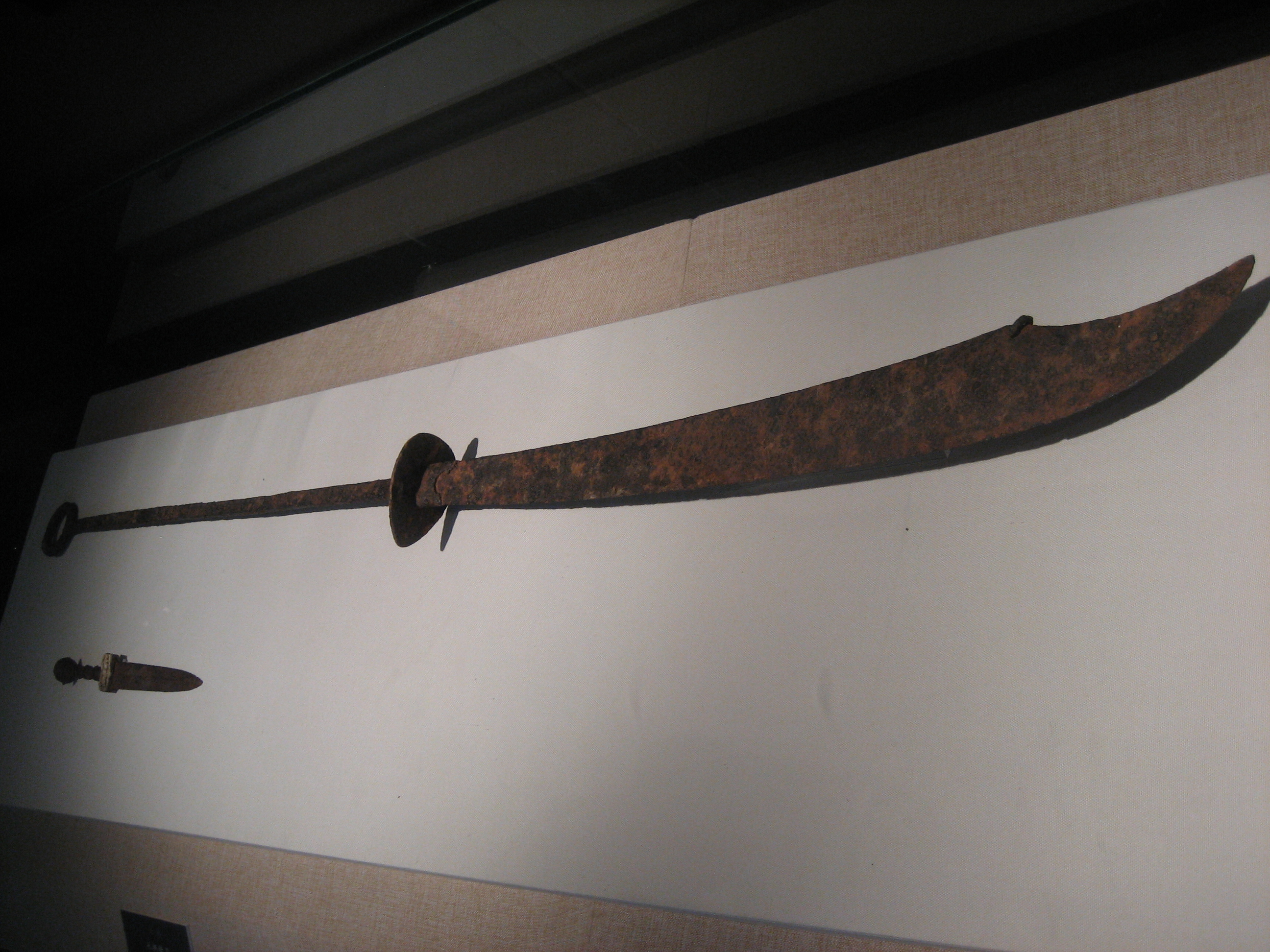
- Guandao, housed in the Inner Mongolia Museum
- Traditional Chinese: 關刀
- Simplified Chinese: 关刀
- Literal meaning: blade of Guan (Yu)
Transcriptions
Standard Mandarin
- Hanyu Pinyin: guāndāo
Yue: Cantonese
- Jyutping: gwaan1 dou1
- IPA: [kʷáːn tóu]

Yanyuedao
- Chinese: 偃月刀
- Literal meaning: reclining moon blade
Transcriptions
Standard Mandarin
- Hanyu Pinyin: yǎnyuèdāo
Yue: Cantonese
- Jyutping: jin2 jyut6 dou1
- IPA: [jǐːn jỳːt tóu]

A guandao is a type of Chinese polearm that is used in some forms of Chinese martial arts. In Chinese, it is properly called a yanyuedao (偃月刀; lit. "reclining moon blade"), the name under which it appears in texts such as the Wujing Zongyao and Huangchao Liqi Tushi. It consists of a heavy blade with a spike at the back and sometimes also a notch at the spike's upper base that can catch an opponent's weapon. In addition, there are often irregular serrations that lead the back edge of the blade to the spike. The blade is mounted atop a 1.5 to 1.8 m (4 ft 11 in to 5 ft 11 in) long wooden or metal pole and a pointed metal counterweight on the opposite end, which is used to balance the heavy blade and for striking.

On modern versions, a red sash or tassel is attached at the joint of the pole and blade. Variations include rings along the length of the straight back edge as found in the nine-ring guandao, the tip curling into a rounded spiral as in the elephant guandao, or a more ornate design as exemplified by the dragon head guandao. However, apart from the "elephant guandao", none of these variations seem to have historical grounding.

== History ==
According to legend, the guandao was invented by the famous general Guan Yu during the early 3rd century AD, hence the name. It is said that he specified its form and size to be made by a smithy and was uniquely able to wield such an imposing weapon due to his large stature and legendary strength. Guan Yu's guandao was called "Green Dragon Crescent Blade" (青龍偃月刀, Qīnglóng yǎnyuèdāo) and weighed 82 Chinese jin. This weight is estimated either at 18.26 kg (40.3 lb) or 48.38 kg (106.7 lb), as a Han dynasty jin was 222.72 g (7.856 oz), while the jin used in the Ming dynasty—during which the Romance of the Three Kingdoms was written—was 590 g (21 oz).

However, while the famous novel Romance of the Three Kingdoms by Luo Guanzhong describes him as wielding the guandao, this description may have been an anachronistic one intended to make the character seem more imposing: historically speaking there was no evidence to show that Guan Yu used the weapon that is thus attributed to him, and indeed there is no indication of the existence of what is now known as the guandao prior to the 11th century, when it was first illustrated in the military manual Wujing Zongyao. The guandao, therefore, possibly did not even exist during Guan Yu's era, meaning that it could be somewhat of a pop culture-derived misnomer. Furthermore, the scholar Tao Hongjing (456–536 AD) recorded in the Gujin Daojianlu (古今刀劍錄, "A Catalogue of Ancient and Modern Sabers and Rapiers") that Guan Yu forged a pair of sabres using iron ore he harvested from Wudushan mountain (武都山) himself, which may have inspired the story that Guan Yu invented his weapon. However, this would also indicate that he did not use a guandao or even anything resembling a guandao, since the pole-mounted or long-handled dao weapons such as the pudao or dadao were all wielded with two hands and so would not have been made or used in a pair.

While some historians still contend that the guandao was simply an uncommon weapon prior to the Tang dynasty and was thus not illustrated before then, historical evidence leans towards the attribution being an instance of creative license. By the time of the Qing dynasty the guandao, for the most part, was not actually intended for field use but was instead used as a tool to test the strength of those who wished to become military officers: weapons of various weights were made, and the test comprised simply performing various required maneuvers using such weapons. During the Qing dynasty some extraordinarily heavy versions of guandao were made for this purpose: a candidate had to be able to wield a weapon weighing 80, 100, or 120 jin (48 kg (106 lb), 60 kg (130 lb), or 72 kg (159 lb), using the modern value for 1 jin = approximately 0.6 kg (1.3 lb)), with weapons of each weight being successively higher grades in the exam, the passage of which led to appointment as military officers of various ranks based on the grade. The heaviest known "testing guandao", which resides in a museum at Shanhaiguan, weighs 83 kg (183 lb). While the examples are taken from the Qing dynasty and therefore may have been influenced by the book (which was written in the Ming dynasty), military officer tests (which began in the Tang dynasty) have always involved lifting heavy stones of standardized weight and maneuvering them about, possibly contributing to the writer's decision to assign an unusual weight to Guan Yu's weapon.

The weapon was also widely adopted by martial artists for the purposes of training and for demonstrating their strength, perhaps also to train specifically for the military officers' tests. Where it was used, it was largely used by infantry. In the Qing dynasty, it was used by the all Han Green Standard Army. Apart from that, the lack of standardization of the antique examples that survive to today seems to indicate that at least from the 19th century onwards it was popular in the civilian martial arts realm as well.

The modern guandao as adopted by martial artists today usually weighs between 2 and 10 kg (4.4 and 22.0 lb), and is typically composed of a wood shaft of about 3 to 5 ft (0.91 to 1.52 m) in length, a short blade of about 12 to 18 in (300 to 460 mm) on one end, and a mace head on the other (which serves mostly as a counterweight to the blade but can also be used for striking), the whole assembly rarely exceeding 5 to 6 ft (1.5 to 1.8 m) in total length. The greatly reduced weight and length reflect its nature as a more practical form for martial artists.

== Combat uses ==
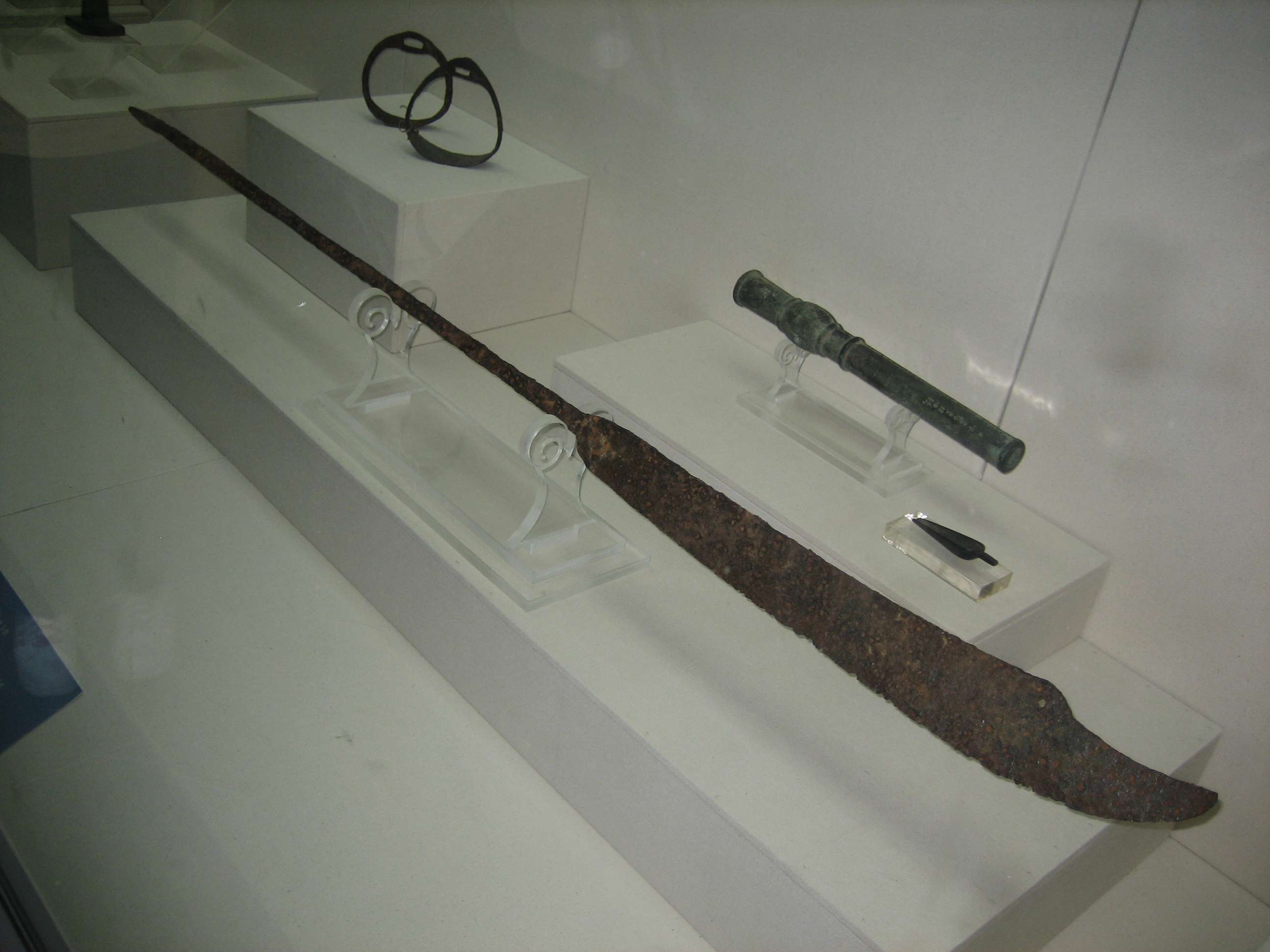
Guandao (Inner Mongolia Museum)

The guandao is used quite frequently in the martial art of contemporary Wushu derived from the Shaolin or Wudangquan form of martial arts in modern times. According to contemporary Wushu practice, its purpose is more to disarm an opponent and deflect his strikes rather than to attack. To that end, a large veil cloth is attached to the end to dissuade and confuse opponents. However, there is no evidence of this being an authentic depiction of the weapon's historical usage. Tassels and cloths are attached to numerous weapons such as jian, dao, meteor hammer, and guandao used in Chinese opera, one of the sources of movements found in contemporary Wushu.

Forms utilizing the weapon in nearly all traditional styles of Chinese martial arts emphasize strong slashing movements and momentum to keep the heavy blade moving through a series of spinning cuts. The considerable weight of the weapon also makes guandao forms good for training the overall conditioning of the body.

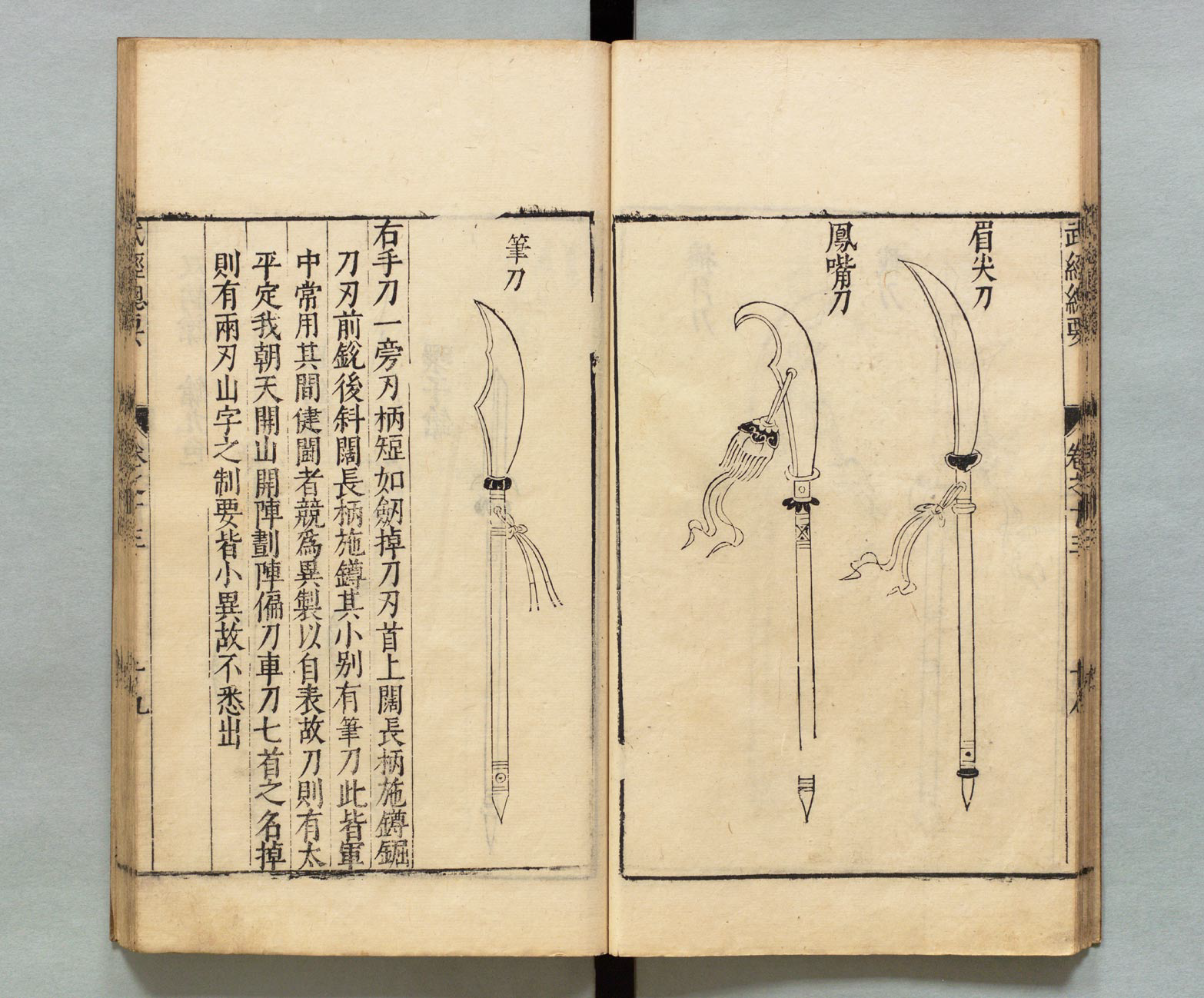
Guandao from the Wujing Zongyao

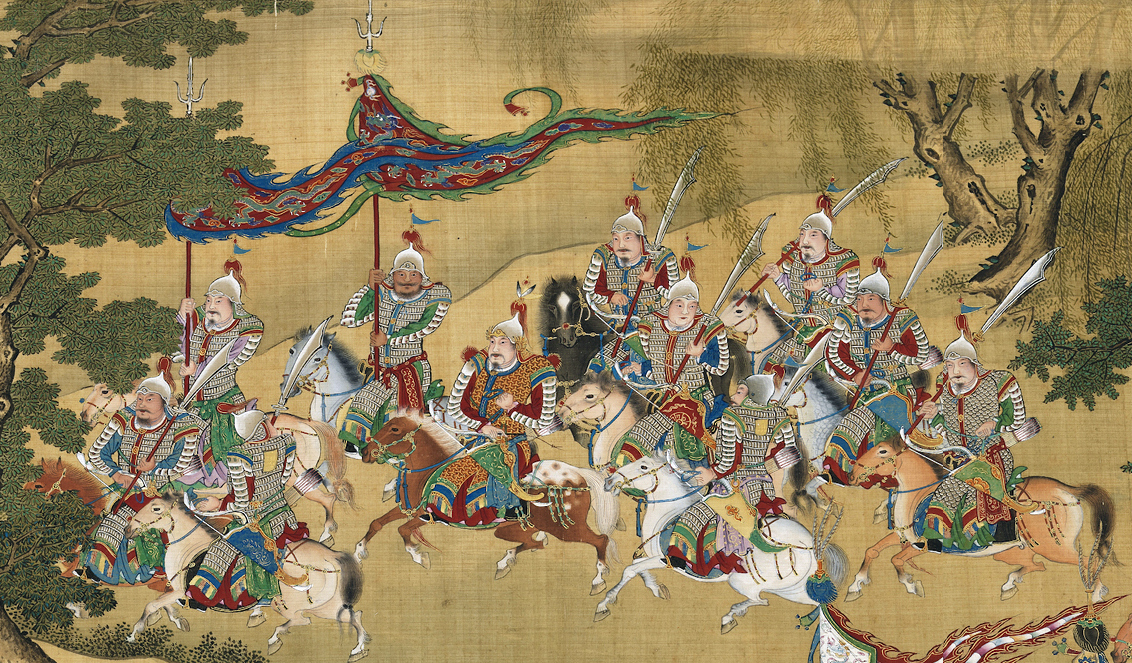
Ming dynasty cavalrymen holding short guandao

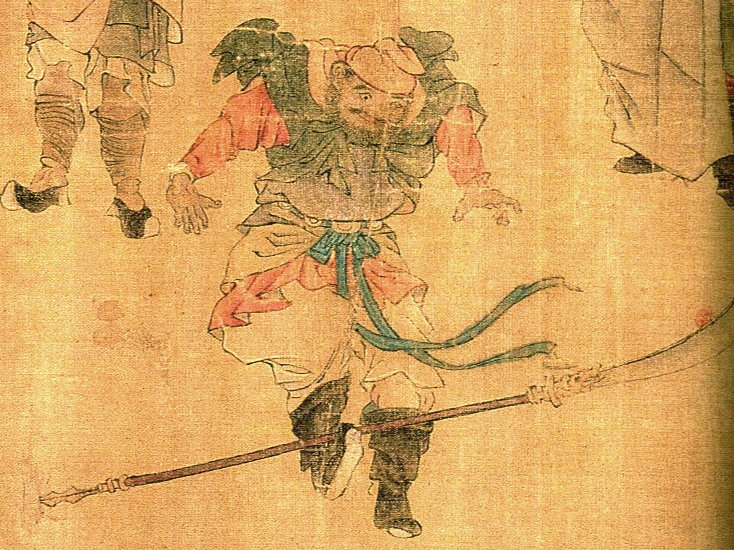
Man kicking a guandao, Ming dynasty

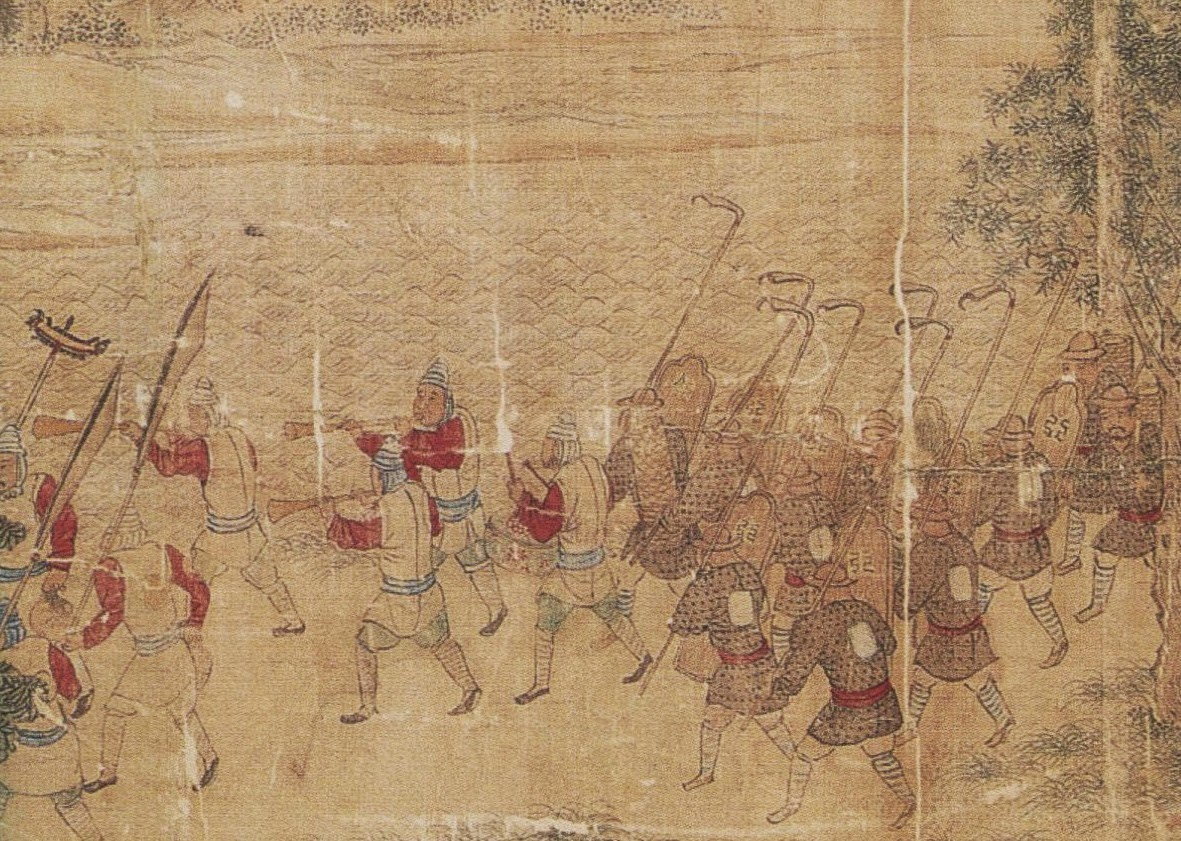
Ming "wolf warriors" holding guandao (left)

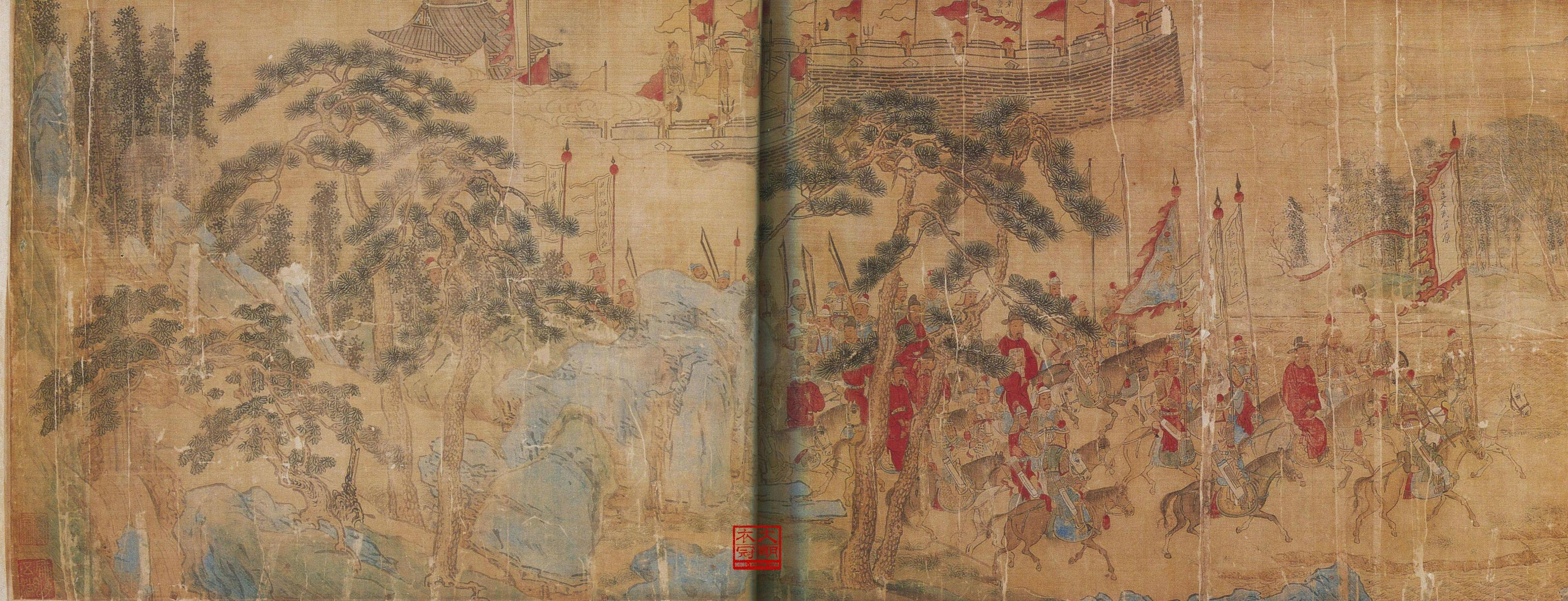
Ming soldiers with guandaos

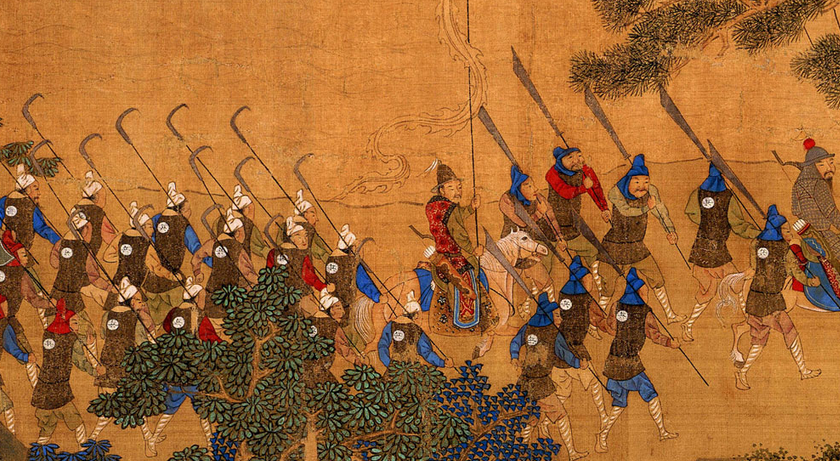
Ming soldiers with guandaos

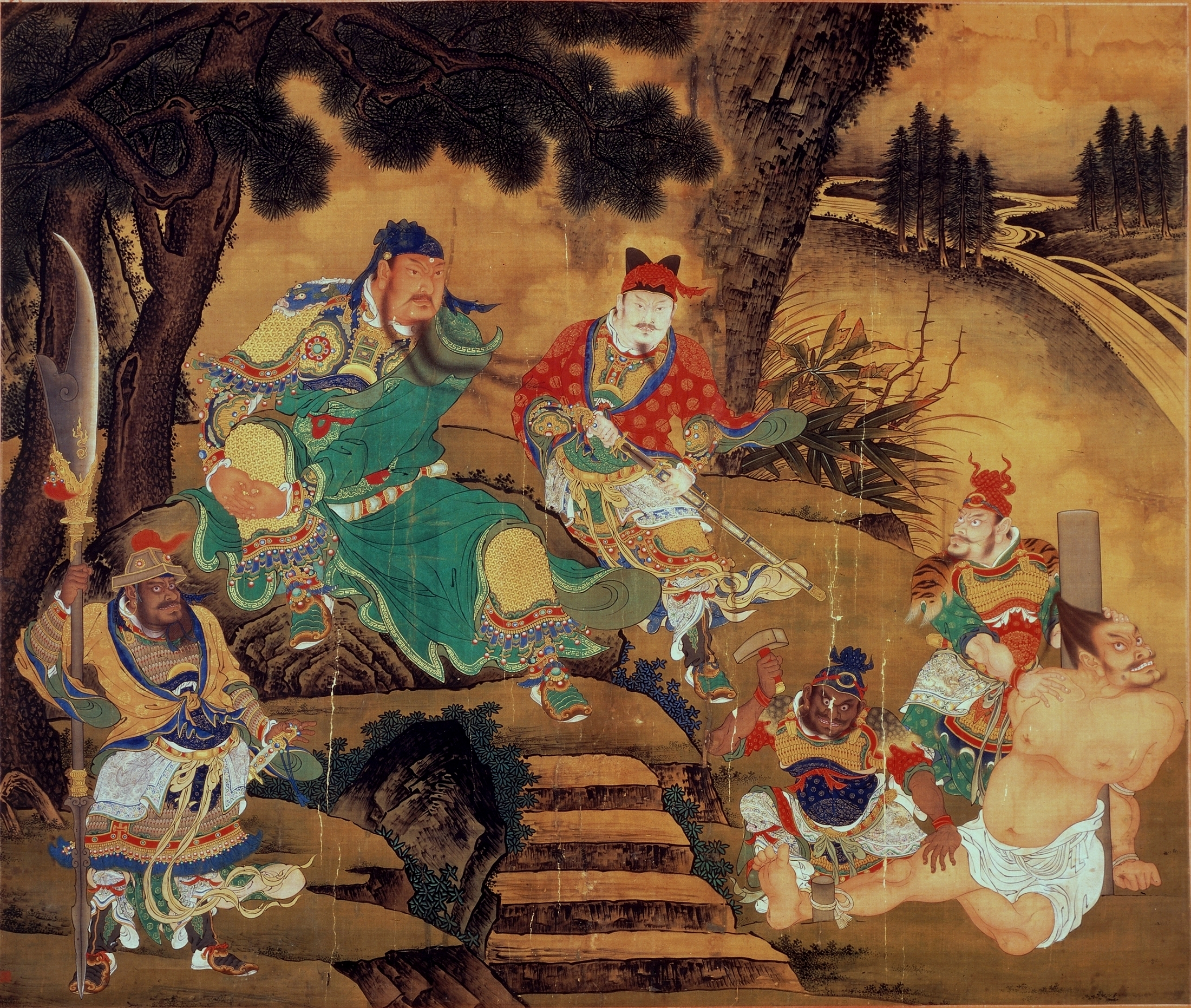
Painting depicting a stylized guandao, c. 1430

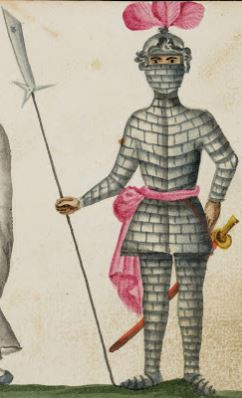
Dutch depiction of a late Ming dynasty soldier wielding a guandao

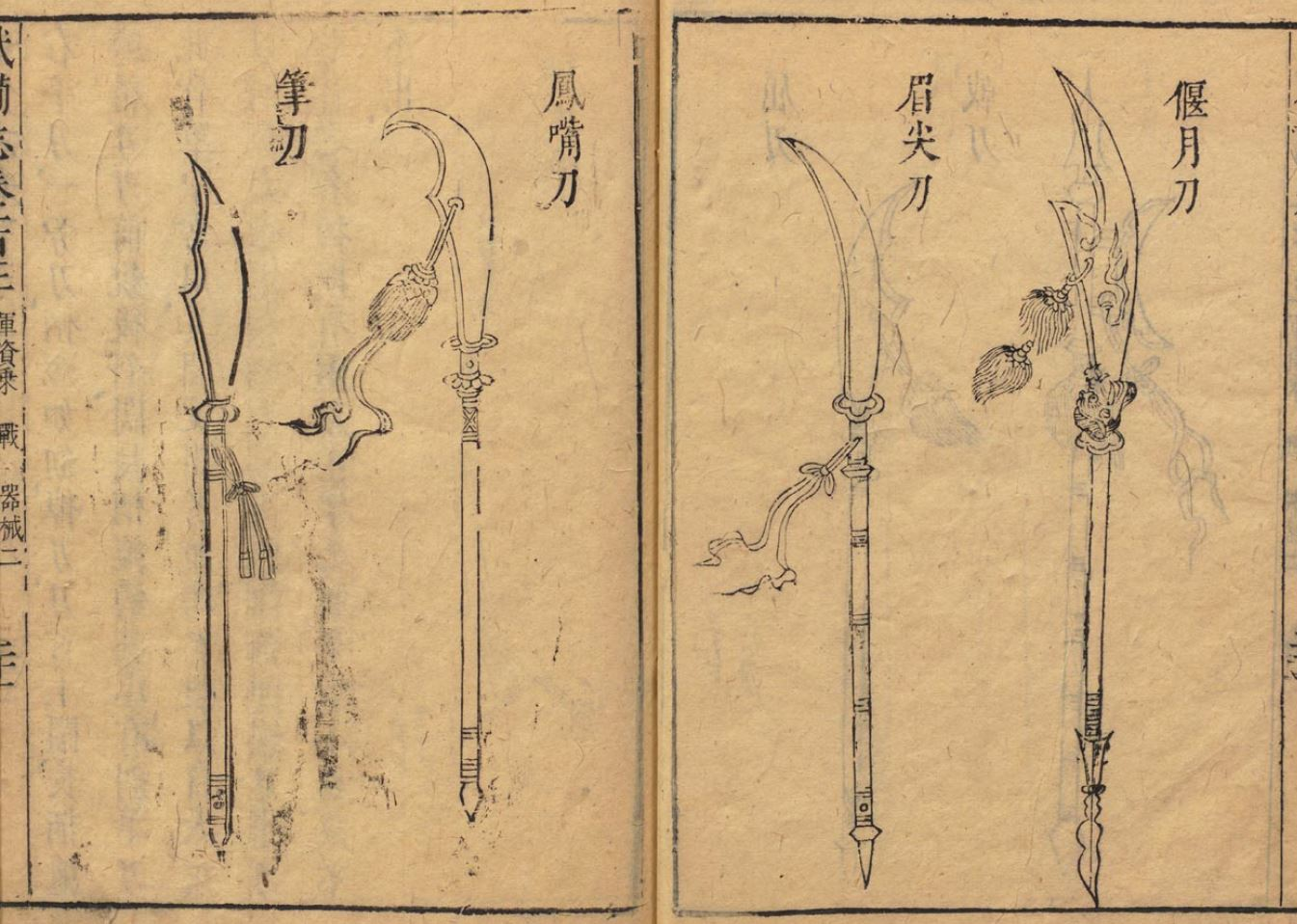
Depictions of guandao from the Wubei Zhi

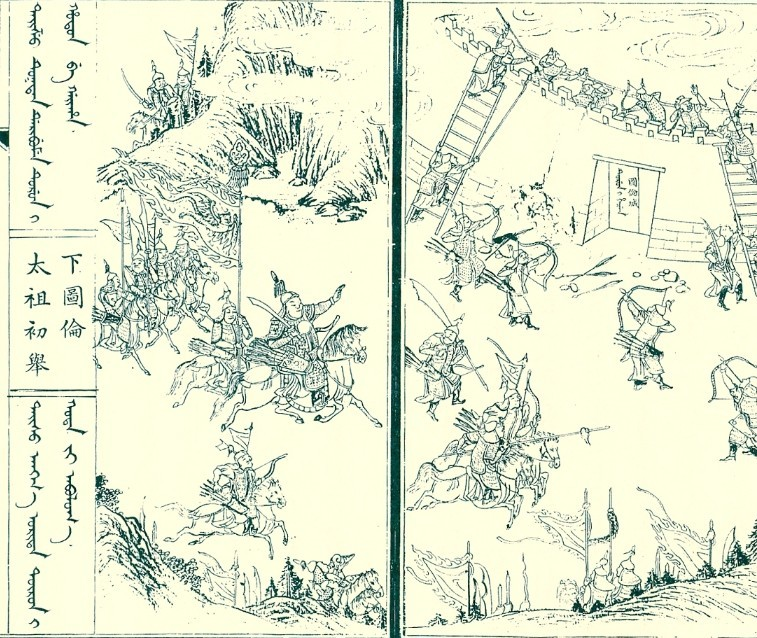
Soldier carrying a guandao fleeing from Nurhaci (center right), 17th c.

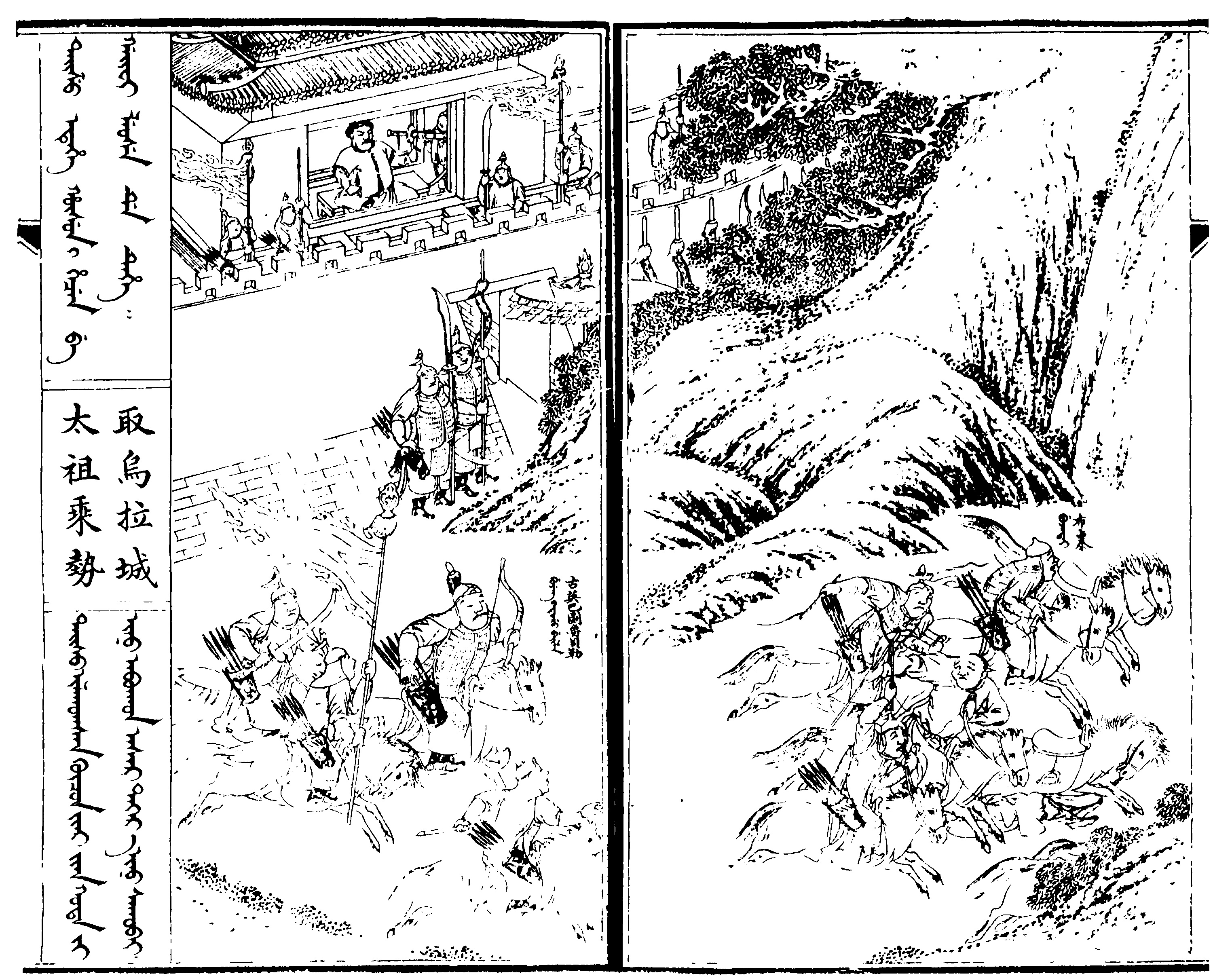
Two Jurchen soldiers wielding guandao

== Popular culture ==
- In Avatar: The Last Airbender, a guandao is used by Kahchi, a member of the Rough Rhinos.
  - In The Legend of Korra, guandaos are used by the Chou Brothers.
- In Xiaolin Showdown, Chase Young's primary weapon is a double-bladed guandao with extendable blades.
- Power Rangers Jungle Fury features Carnisoar, the Sky Overlord with the Spirit of the Hawk, using a double-bladed guandao.
- In the series Yona of the Dawn, the character Hak uses a guandao.
- In the video game For Honor, the character Jiang Jun wields a guandao.
- In the video game Warframe, the Guandao and Guandao prime are a type of polearm that the player can craft.
- Dynasty Warriors features Guan Yu wielding a guandao.
- In the manga Kingdom, General Ouki uses as his main weapon a guandao, and he gives it to the main character Shin. There are many other references to these kinds of weapons.
- In the video game Library of Ruina, the character Xiao wields a guandao alongside a longsword. This follows into the follow up game Limbus Company, where the character Hong Lu also wields a guandao.
- In the video game Hades, one of the weapons that the character can unlock is a stylized guandao, named after Guan Yu.
- In Honkai: Star Rail, Jing Yuan wields a guandao.
- In Totally Accurate Battle Simulator, Lady Red Jade wields a guandao.
- In the series Friends, the character Ross has a guandao hanging on his apartment wall.
- In the video game Yakuza, the character Lau Ka Long wields a guandao in the first phase of his boss fight. The character and the weapon subsequently reappeared in Yakuza 3.
- In the fantasy novel series The Wheel of Time, the character Mat Cauthon wields a guandao, which in the fictional language of the setting is called an "ashandarei".

== See also ==
- Bisentō
- Dadao
- Fangtian Ji
- Glaive
- Halberd
- Naginata
- Pudao
- Serpent spear
- Woldo
