= Bisentō =

Japanese polearm

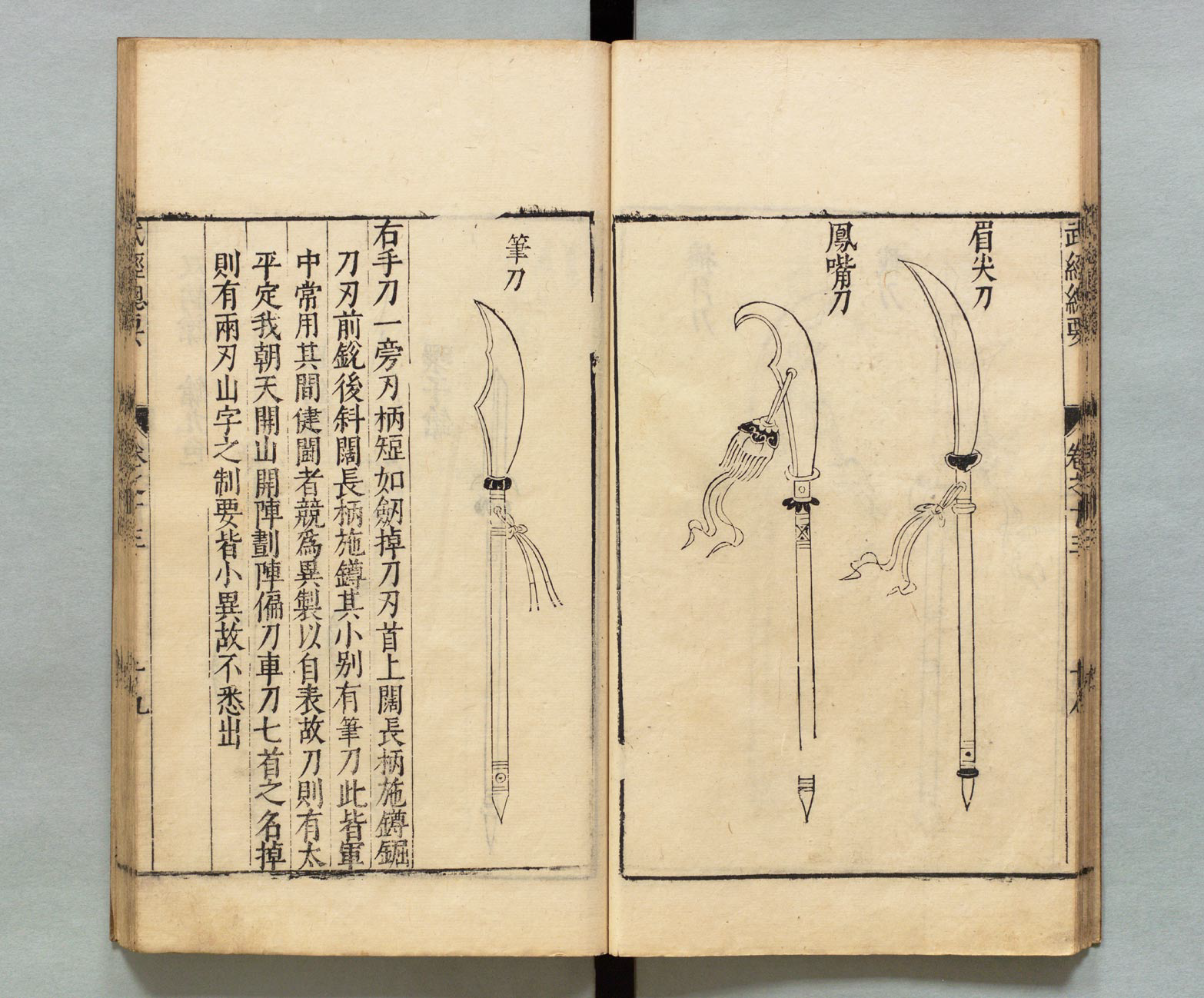
Bisento (Méi jiāndāo; 眉尖刀) from the Wǔjīng Zǒngyào (武經總要)

A bisentō (眉尖刀, 'brow blade') is a polearm used in feudal Japan. The bisentō has various descriptions, "a double-edged long sword with a thick truncated blade", "a spear-like weapon with a blade at the end that resembles a scimitar", "a polearm resembling a glaive, with a long, heavy haft and a heavy, curved blade". The bisentō is said to have been used by ninja and peasants.

Depictions of this weapon can be found in the Chinese military compilations the Wǔ jīng zǒng yào, Sāncái tú huì, the Wǔbèi zhì, and many others, though no artifact representations currently exist of this implement.

== See also ==
- Guandao
- Naginata
