= Fangtian ji =

Close combat weapon

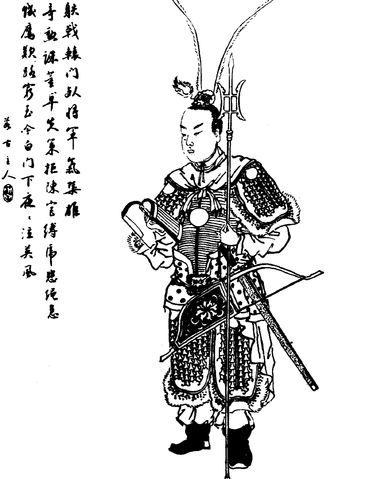
Lü Bu holding a Fangtian ji in a Qing-dynasty illustration

Fangtian ji (Chinese: 方天戟, or Traditional Chinese: 方天畫戟; pinyin: Fāngtiān huàjǐ) is a term in Chinese cultural and literary tradition for a distinctive type of ji, a class of polearms that combine spear- and blade-like elements.

In popular usage, fangtian ji is most commonly understood as a highly ornamented, halberd-like polearm, featuring a central spear point with additional symmetrical side blades on both sides, and is especially famous as the signature weapon attributed to the warlord Lü Bu in later retellings and fictions of Three Kingdoms period. The weapon is widely recognized in Chinese opera, folklore, martial-arts performance, and modern media, though the term's exact historical form and standardization are not uniform across sources.

== Name ==
Fangtian (方天) is a metaphorical term indicating that the weapon's top is symmetrical and rectangular in shape.

Huaji (畫戟), literally "painted ji," interpreted as "decorated," "ornamented," ji. In practice, the term functions primarily as a specific named variant within the broader and historically diverse category of ji polearms.

== See also ==
- Chinese polearm
- Guandao
- Lü Bu
- Romance of the Three Kingdoms
- Serpent spear
