= Podao =

Type of pole weapon

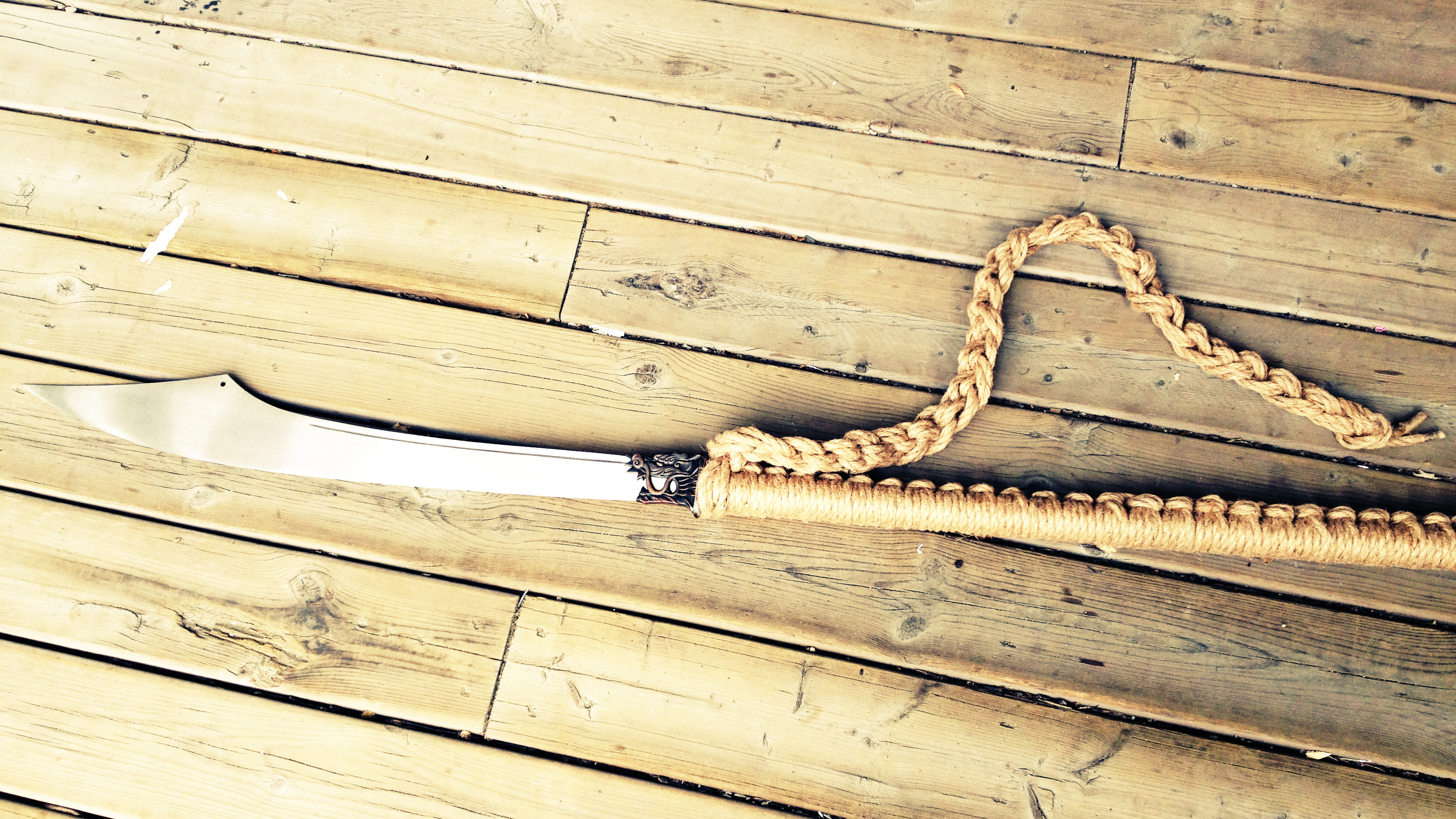
- A photograph of a Chinese podao, with the handle wrapped in hemp rope.
- Traditional Chinese: 朴刀
- Simplified Chinese: 朴刀
Transcriptions
Standard Mandarin
- Hanyu Pinyin: pōdāo
- Wade–Giles: p'o^{1} tao^{1}
Yue: Cantonese
- Yale Romanization: pok3 dou1

Podao or pudao (Chinese: 朴刀; pinyin: pōdāo) is a Chinese single-edged infantry weapon that is still used primarily for training in various Chinese martial arts. The blade of the weapon is shaped like a Chinese broadsword, but the weapon has a longer handle, usually around one to two meters (about three to six feet) which is circular in cross-section. It looks somewhat similar to the guandao.

The pudao is sometimes called a "horse-cutter sword" since it is speculated to have been used to slice the legs out from under a horse during battle (like the zhanmadao). It is somewhat analogous to the Japanese nagamaki, although the nagamaki sword may have been developed independently. The pudao also resembles the Korean hyeopdo.

== Popular culture ==
- Shang-Chi and the Legend of the Ten Rings features locations in Ta Lo as well as Razor Fist using dragon scale podao to fight the Dweller-in-Darkness.

== Gallery ==
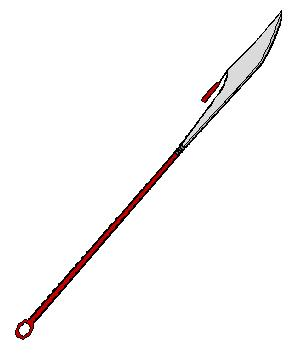
A drawing of a pudao
