= Serpent spear =

Ancient Chinese polearm

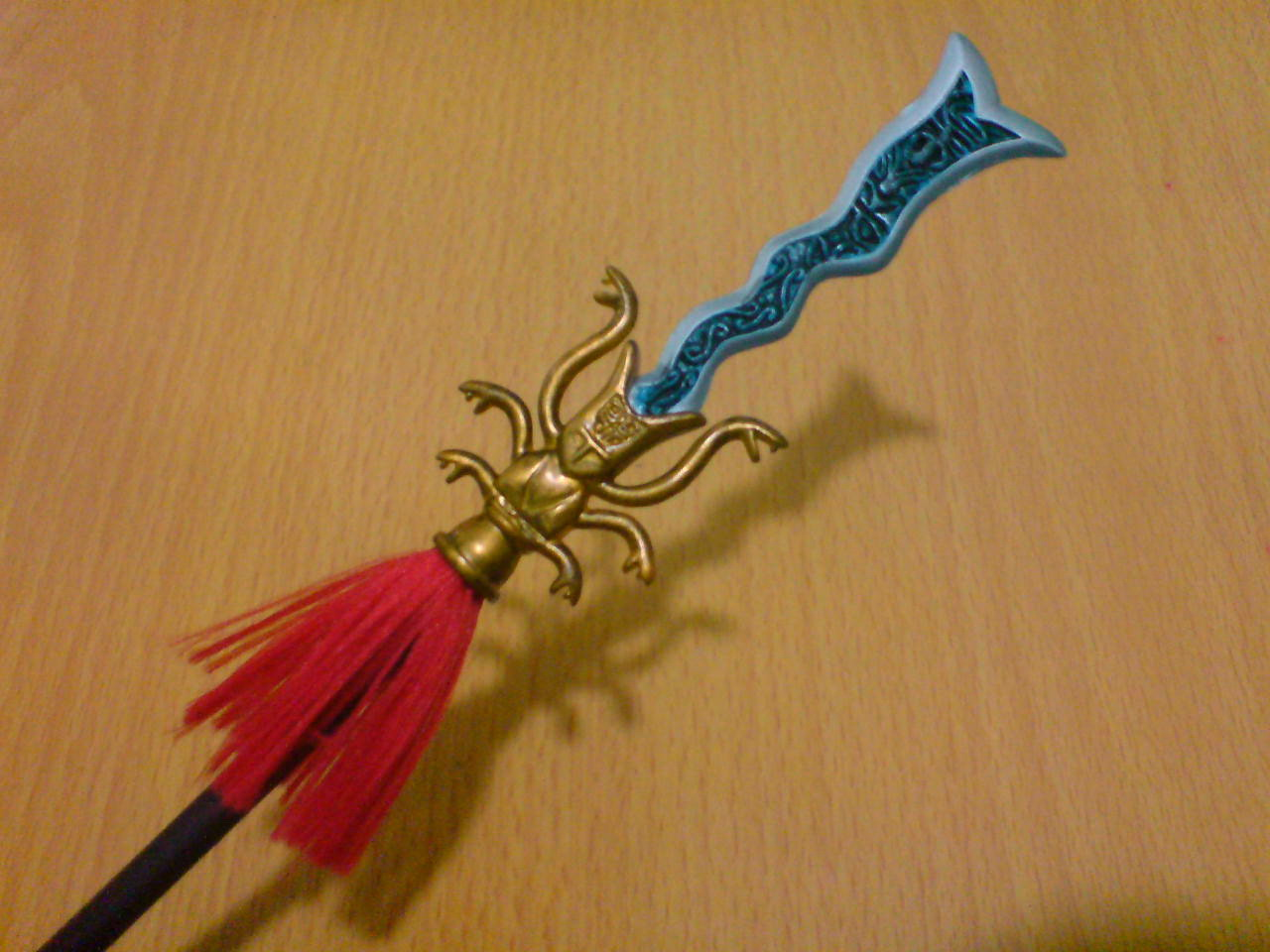
The 1.8-zhang Serpent Spear in the Japanese videogame Dynasty Warriors (model product)

Serpent spear (Chinese: 蛇矛) is a class of ancient Chinese polearms. Its spearhead is wavy in shape, resembling the movement of a snake. The wavy spear blade also increases pulling resistance, enabling the disarming of an opponent's weapon, and thus differs slightly in use from ordinary long spears.

In the fiction Romance of the Three Kingdoms, the general Zhang Fei’s weapon is called "1.8-zhang Serpent Spear" (丈八蛇矛), also known as the "1.8-zhang Steel-Piercing Spear" (丈八點鋼矛). Its exceptional length increases its reach and destructive power. Some works depict the spear tip as forked snake tongue shape; being difficult to thrust in, it further highlights Zhang Fei's strength.

== Characteristics ==
The serpent spear's greatest characteristic lies in its spearhead, which resembles the curved body of a snake. In Chinese literature, the most famous type of serpent spear is the “1.8-zhang Serpent Spear”, of which the one used by the Shu Han general Zhang Fei in Romance of the Three Kingdoms is the most renowned. “1.8 zhang” refers to the length of the spear. The scholar Liu Xi mentioned in Shiming that “a spear of 1.8 zhang is called a shuo, held on horseback”, which is the prototype of the 1.8-zhang spear. According to the Three Kingdoms-period weights and measures, one zhang is about 242 centimetres long, so the length of “1.8 zhang (one zhang eight chi)” is a little over 4 metres. This type of 1.8-zhang serpent spear, famed for its length, is somewhat difficult to use.

== History ==
Serpent spears also appear in historical records. The Book of Jin records: “Chen An brandished a seven-chi broadsword in his left hand, and held a 1.8-zhang serpent spear in his right.” Chen An was a fierce general of the Western and Eastern Jin period, and the serpent spear he used became a symbol of his martial prowess.

== In fictions ==
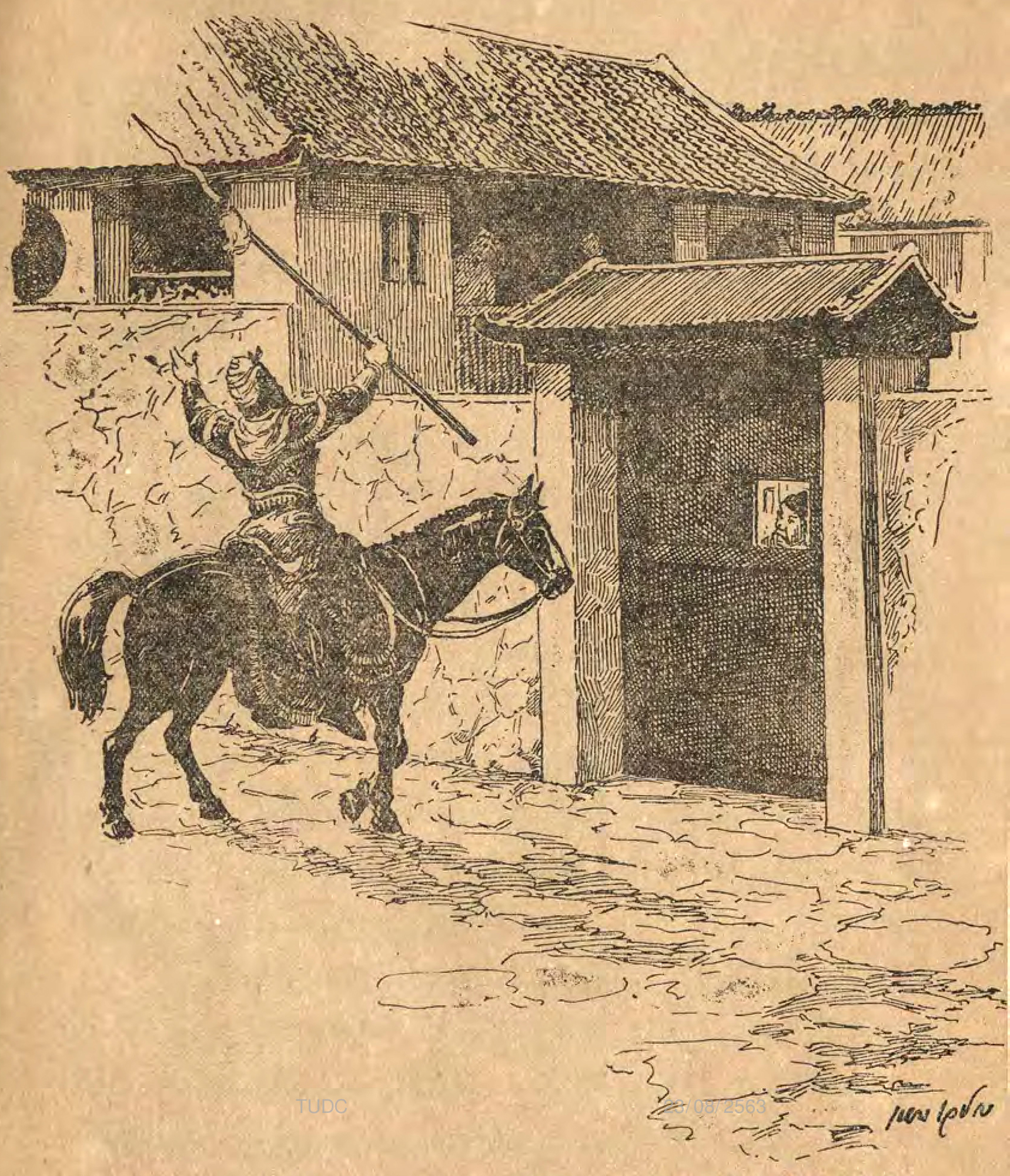
Zhang Fei wielding a serpent spear in an illustration

Serpent spears are also mentioned in literary works throughout the ages. In the Tang poet Li Bai’s “Sending my nephew Zheng Guan to the army (II)”, there is the line “A 1.8-zhang serpent spear comes from Longxi; a bent bow brushes the arrows, and the white gibbon cries.” In Du Mu’s poem “Drinking Alone at the Commandery Studio”, there is the line “Rhinoceros armor: Wu troops fight with bows and crossbows; serpent spears and Yan halberds gallop with gleaming edges.” In Zhang Jianfeng’s “In Reply to Han Xiaoshu Yu: Ball-Playing Song”, there is the line “One cannot be without affairs and practise the serpent spear; in leisure, go to the flat field to learn horsemanship.” In Li Shen’s “Thirty Rhymes on Arriving at Xuanwu”, there is the line “Dragon tallies: the paired oil is heavy; serpent spears: a hundred temperings make them bright.” In Pi Rixiu’s “Taihu Poems: Stone Slabs”, there is the line “Within, it is like a gleaming dragon sword; without, only layered serpent spears.” In Lu Guimeng’s “Village Night (Two Poems)”, there is the line “Meet the enemy and dance the serpent spear; when talking, seize the rhinoceros handle.” The monk-poet Jiaoran’s “Wuyuan Xing, Presented to Qiu Qingcen” includes the line “Within the chest, leopard strategy spreads battle-clouds; in the hand, the serpent spear swings white snow.” Wen Tingyun’s “Written While Ill, Presented to a Friend” also includes the line “The serpent spear still turns in battle; the fish garb confines itself in captivity.” The Ming Xie Zhaozhe’s Wuzazu, “People, Part 1”, says: “Chen An used blade and spear together; of ten strikes, five or six wounded; at the time he was deemed a strongman; yet Ping first grappled in battle; after three exchanges, he seized his serpent spear, hung his head at the bend of the ravine—easy as reaching into a bag.” Lu Xun’s short-story collection A Call to Arms also mentions it in passing: “He clenched both hands into fists at the same time, as if grasping the shape of an invisible serpent spear.”

In Luo Guanzhong’s chaptered novel Romance of the Three Kingdoms, chapter 1 records: "Zhang Fei had a 1.8-zhang Steel-piercing Spear"; chapter 5 also says: “Beside him was a general with round, glaring eyes and tiger whiskers bristling upright; he brandished a 1.8-zhang serpent spear, galloped his horse, and shouted loudly.” From then on, the serpent spear became Zhang Fei's iconic weapon; after Zhang Fei's death, his son Zhang Bao also “brandished the 1.8-zhang Steel-piercing Spear his father had used” as his weapon. In most related creations about the Three Kingdoms—animation, manga, video games, and so on—Zhang Fei's weapon is set as the “1.8-zhang serpent spear”. In the same novel, the Eastern Wu general Cheng Pu also uses an “iron-spined serpent spear”. In Water Margin, among the 108 heroes, Lin Chong "Leopard Head" and Chen Da "Leaping Ravine Tiger" use the 1.8-zhang serpent spear (therefore Lin Chong's eulogy poem calls him “Little Zhang Fei called by all the mountain”). In Investiture of the Gods, Chong Yingbiao, son of the Northern Lord Chong Houhu, also wields a 1.8-zhang serpent spear. In Heroes Legendary of the Great Ming, Chang Yuchun is also a fierce general who uses a 1.8-zhang serpent spear.

== See also ==
- Guandao
- Fangtian Ji
