= Ding Desun =

Fictional character in the Chinese classical novel Water Margin

- Water Margin character
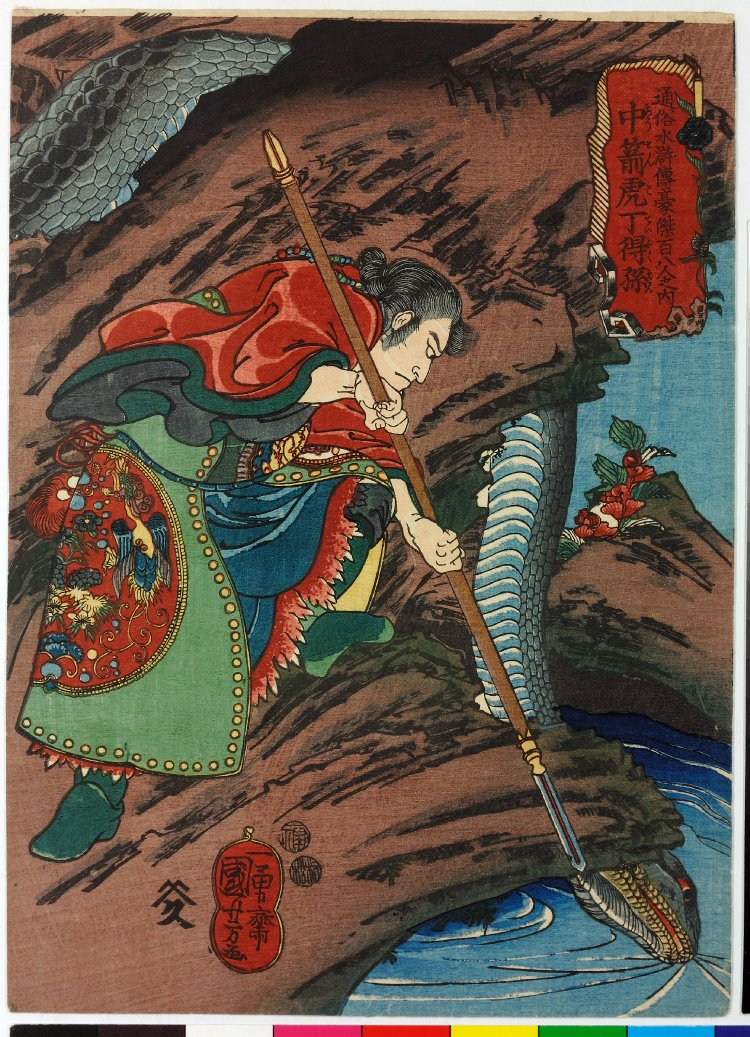
- an illustration of Ding Desun by Utagawa Kuniyoshi
- First appearance: Chapter 70

In-universe information
- Nickname: "Arrow-hit Tiger" 中箭虎
- Weapon: forked spear
- Origin: military officer
- Designation: Infantry Commander of Liangshan
- Rank: 79th, Speed Star (地速星) of the 72 Earthly Fiends

Chinese names
- Simplified Chinese: 丁得孙
- Traditional Chinese: 丁得孫
- Pinyin: Dīng Désūn
- Wade–Giles: Ting Te-sun

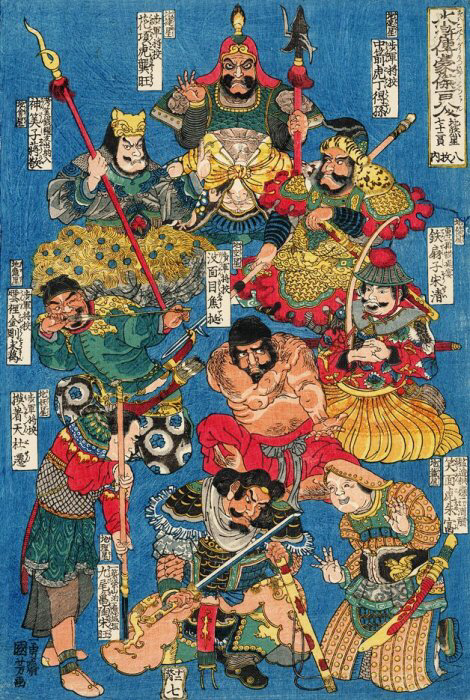
An illustration of nine of the 108 Heroes by Utagawa Kuniyoshi. Clockwise from top: Gong Wang, Ding Desun, Song Qing, Jiao Ting, Zhu Fu, Tao Zongwang, Du Qian, Song Wan, and Jiang Jing.

Ding Desun is a fictional character in Water Margin, one of the Classic Chinese Novels. Nicknamed "Arrow-hit Tiger", he ranks 79th among the 108 Heroes and 43rd among the 72 Earthly Fiends.

== Background ==
Ding Desun is nicknamed "Arrow-hit Tiger" because he has multiple scars on his face and body. A skilled warrior, he specialises in using a forked spear. He and Gong Wang serve as the lieutenants of Zhang Qing, a military officer stationed in Dongchang Prefecture (東昌府; in present-day Liaocheng, Shandong).

== Becoming an outlaw ==
When the outlaws from Liangshan Marsh attack Dongchang Prefecture, Zhang Qing, flanked by Ding Desun and Gong Wang, leads his troops out to engage the enemy. Zhang Qing uses his deadly stone-flinging skill to defeat several of Liangshan's best fighters on horseback and on foot. Each time he takes down his opponent, Ding Desun and Gong Wang will charge forward and attempt to take his opponent captive.

At one point, Zhang Qing and Dong Ping duel on horseback and start grappling with each other after discarding their weapons. Gong Wang moves in to intercept Liangshan's Lin Chong and Hua Rong when they attempt to join the fray to help Dong Ping, but he is no match for the two and ends up being captured. Meanwhile, Ding Desun is captured too by Liangshan's Lü Fang and Guo Sheng. Zhang Qing ultimately falls into a trap and gets taken captive by the outlaws. He decides to surrender and join the outlaws; Ding Desun and Gong Wang follow suit.

== Campaigns and death ==
Ding Desun is appointed as a commander of the Liangshan infantry after the 108 Heroes are fully assembled. He participates in the campaigns against the Liao invaders and rebel forces in Song territory after the outlaws receive amnesty from Emperor Huizong.

During the final campaign against Fang La's rebel forces, Ding Desun is assigned to attack Shezhou (present-day She County, Anhui) and lure the enemy into an ambush. The plan succeeds and the enemy is routed. While pursuing the enemy, Ding Desun is bitten by a venomous snake in the bushes and dies of poisoning.
