= Zhang Qing (Featherless Arrow) =

Fictional character in the Chinese classical novel Water Margin

- Water Margin character
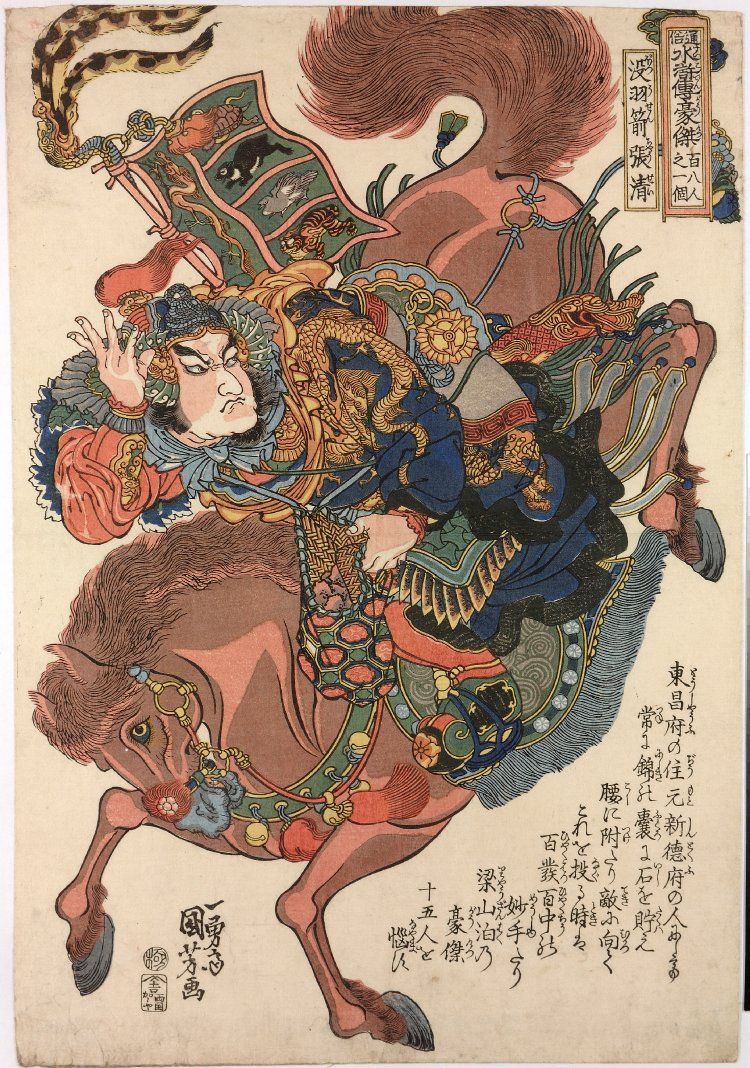
- an illustration of Zhang Qing by Utagawa Kuniyoshi
- First appearance: Chapter 70

In-universe information
- Nicknames: "Featherless Arrow" 沒羽箭
- Weapon: spear, stones
- Origin: military officer
- Designation: Tiger Cub Vanguard Commander of Liangshan
- Rank: 16th, Agile Star (天捷星) of the 36 Heavenly Spirits
- Ancestral home / Place of origin: Zhangde Prefecture (present-day Anyang, Henan)

Chinese names
- Simplified Chinese: 张清
- Traditional Chinese: 張清
- Pinyin: Zhāng Qīng
- Wade–Giles: Chang Ch'ing

Zhang Qing is a fictional character in Water Margin, one of the Classic Chinese Novels. Nicknamed "Featherless Arrow", he ranks 16th among the 36 Heavenly Spirits, the first third of the 108 Heroes.

== Background ==
The novel describes Zhang Qing as a handsome, energetic and agile warrior with a waist like that of a wolf, arms like those of an ape, and a body like that of a tiger. Originally from Zhangde Prefecture (彰德府; present-day Anyang, Henan), he serves as a military officer in Dongchang Prefecture (東昌府; present-day Liaocheng, Shandong). He is nicknamed "Featherless Arrow" because he can fling stones with deadly accuracy.

== Joining Liangshan ==
Zhang Qing is first introduced when the outlaws at Liangshan Marsh, unable to decide between Song Jiang and Lu Junyi, split into two groups under either's command to attack Dongping and Dongchang prefectures under the agreement that whoever captures his target first will be the next chief of Liangshan.

While attacking Dongchang Prefecture, Lu Junyi's group faces a setback when they encounter Zhang Qing, who holds them off easily and even injures Hao Siwen with a stone. When Song Jiang's group, having captured Dongping Prefecture first, comes to reinforce Lu Junyi, Zhang Qing duels on horseback with several of Liangshan's best warriors and uses his deadly stone-hurling skill to great effect. He wounds or shocks Xu Ning, Yan Shun, Han Tao, Peng Qi, Xuan Zan, Huyan Zhuo, Yang Zhi, Zhu Tong, Lei Heng, and Suo Chao with his stones. At one point, he even captures Liu Tang, who has challenged him to fight on foot, after stunning him with a stone. Guan Sheng manages to deflect Zhang Qing's stone but retreats after feeling the vibration from the impact on his guandao. Dong Ping, who has recently joined the outlaws, manages to dodge Zhang Qing's stones and get close to him. The two warriors tussle on horseback until Zhang Qing abandons his weapon and grabs the ends of Dong Ping's spears. Meanwhile, Zhang Qing's lieutenants Gong Wang and Ding Desun are defeated and captured by the Liangshan outlaws. Without his lieutenants to guard his flanks, Zhang Qing feels nervous so he retreats. Dong Ping attempts to pursue Zhang Qing but forgets about the stones, and is nearly hit by a stone which scrapes his ear.

Annoyed yet impressed with Zhang Qing for his stone-flinging skill, Song Jiang is determined to win him over so he discusses with Liangshan's chief strategist Wu Yong to come up with a plan to lure Zhang Qing into an ambush. The outlaws pretend to be escorting supplies past Dongchang Prefecture, luring Zhang Qing to come out to attack them. Lu Zhishen, who is leading the convoy, is wounded by a flying stone from Zhang Qing but Wu Song saves him and they retreat. Buoyed by his success, Zhang Qing attempts to raid the outlaws' supply line near the river. When Zhang Qing approaches, he is engulfed in darkness when Liangshan's sorcerer Gongsun Sheng casts a spell, causing him to lose his way and end up falling into the river, where he is captured by Liangshan marines.

Song Jiang treats the captured Zhang Qing respectfully and manages to convince him to surrender and join the Liangshan cause. Moved by Song Jiang's sincerity, Zhang Qing agrees and helps the outlaws trick the governor of Dongchang Prefecture into opening the gate, allowing the outlaws to enter and capture the prefecture. Later, Zhang Qing also recommends his friend Huangfu Duan, a famous veterinarian, to join Liangshan and care for their horses.

== Campaigns and death ==
Zhang Qing is appointed as one of the eight Tiger Cub Vanguard Commanders of the Liangshan cavalry after the 108 Heroes are fully assembled. He participates in the campaigns against the Liao invaders and rebels in Song territory after the outlaws receive amnesty from Emperor Huizong.

During the campaign against Tian Hu's rebel forces, Zhang Qing encounters Qiongying, the stepdaughter of one of Tian Hu's followers. Qiongying had met Zhang Qing before when he appeared in her dreams as a mystical warrior who taught her how to fling stones. When they finally meet, they fall in love, and Qiongying convinces her stepfather to turn against Tian Hu and help the Liangshan forces defeat the rebels. Zhang Qing marries Qiongying and they have a son, Zhang Jie (張節), who later serves as a Song military officer like his father and fights in the Jin–Song wars.

In the final campaign against Fang La's rebel forces, Zhang Qing and Dong Ping are assigned to attack Dusong Pass (獨松關; located south of present-day Anji County, Zhejiang), where they face the enemy warrior Li Tianrun. After Dong Ping is injured in the left arm by a projectile, he retreats so Zhang Qing takes over the fight with Li Tianrun. After Li Tianrun dodges a strike, Zhang Qing's spear gets stuck in a tree. While Zhang Qing is struggling to pull it out, Li Tianrun seizes the chance to stab him in the abdomen, killing him. When the campaign is over, Zhang Qing's remains are sent back to his hometown in Zhangde Prefecture for burial.
