= Wei Dingguo =

Fictional character in the Chinese classical novel Water Margin

- Water Margin character
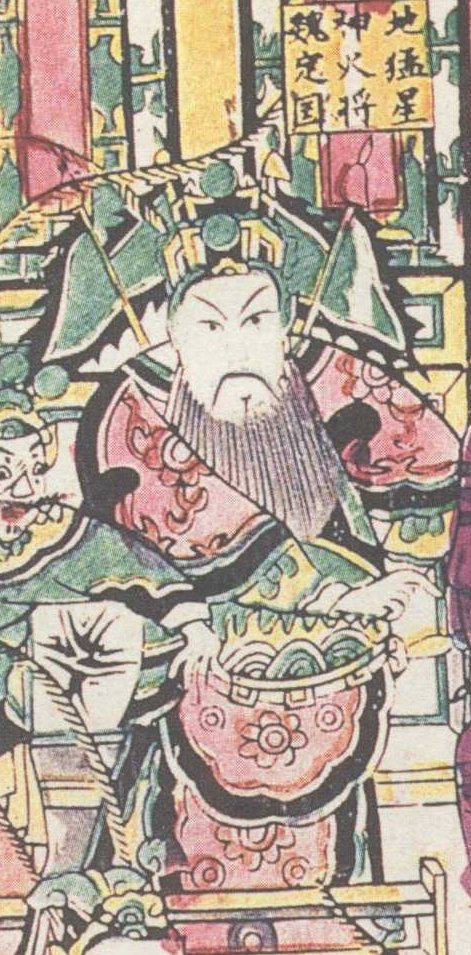
- a Qing dynasty illustration of Wei Dingguo
- First appearance: Chapter 67

In-universe information
- Nickname: "General of Holy Fire" 神火將軍
- Weapon: sabre, bow and arrows
- Origin: military officer
- Designation: Tiger Cub Patrol Commander of Liangshan
- Rank: 45th, Fierce Star (地猛星) of the 72 Earthly Fiends
- Ancestral home / Place of origin: Lingzhou (in present-day Dezhou, Shandong)

Chinese names
- Simplified Chinese: 魏定国
- Traditional Chinese: 魏定國
- Pinyin: Wèi Dìngguó
- Wade–Giles: Wei Ting-kuo

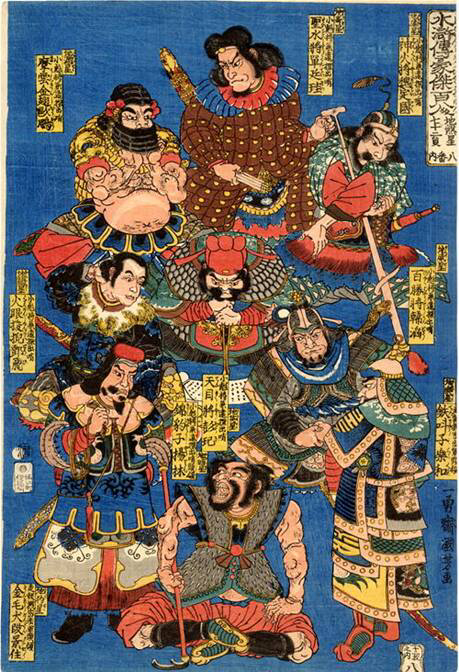
An illustration of nine of the 108 Heroes by Utagawa Kuniyoshi. Peng Qi is in the centre. The rest are (clockwise from top): Shan Tinggui, Wei Dingguo, Han Tao, Yue He, Yang Lin, Duan Jingzhu, Deng Fei, and Ou Peng.

Wei Dingguo is a fictional character in Water Margin, one of the Classic Chinese Novels. Nicknamed "General of Holy Fire", he ranks 45th among the 108 Heroes and ninth among the 72 Earthly Fiends.

== Background ==
Originally from Lingzhou (凌州; in present-day Dezhou, Shandong), Wei Dingguo serves as a military officer in his home prefecture alongside Shan Tinggui. A highly-skilled warrior, he rides a red stallion, and dons a suit of red armour and a helmet topped with a red feather. Wielding a long sabre, he is known for using flammable substances in battle, supported by a 500-men unit whom he has trained in this form of warfare. As a result, he is nicknamed "General of Holy Fire".

== Battle of Lingzhou ==
Wei Dingguo and Shan Tinggui are first introduced in the novel when they are ordered by Grand Tutor Cai Jing to lead government forces from Lingzhou to destroy the outlaws at Liangshan Marsh.

Guan Sheng, a former military officer who has joined the outlaws, volunteers to lead Liangshan forces to engage the enemy at Lingzhou, with Hao Siwen and Xuan Zan serving as his lieutenants.

In their first clash, Hao Siwen and Xuan Zan are lured by Shan Tinggui and Wei Dingguo respectively into traps and end up being taken captive.

While Shan Tinggui and Wei Dingguo remain behind to fight Guan Sheng, they order their men to escort Hao Siwen and Xuan Zan in prison carts back to the capital. En route, the convoy is intercepted at Deadwood Hill (枯樹山) in Kouzhou (寇州; present-day Guan County, Shandong) by a group of outlaws led by Li Kui, Jiao Ting and Bao Xu. The two captives are freed and they work with the outlaws to stage an assault on Lingzhou.

At Lingzhou, Guan Sheng challenges Shan Tinggui to a duel on horseback outside the city, defeating and capturing him. He treats Shan Tinggui respectfully, and manages to convince Shan to surrender and join the Liangshan outlaws as he did himself earlier.

== Becoming an outlaw ==
Left standing alone, Wei Dingguo leads his 500-men unit to attack Guan Sheng's men. Meanwhile, the outlaws from Deadwood Hill attack and capture Lingzhou while Wei Dingguo is busy fighting outside the city.

Upon hearing of Lingzhou's fall, Wei Dingguo retreats to a nearby county, where he prepares to make a last stand. Shan Tinggui finds him and tries to persuade him to surrender and join Liangshan as well, to which Wei Dingguo agrees on the condition that Guan Sheng comes to meet him alone. As promised, Guan Sheng meets Wei Dingguo unaccompanied and manages to convince him to become part of the Liangshan outlaw band.

== Campaigns and death ==
Wei Dingguo is appointed as a Tiger Cub Patrol Commander of the Liangshan cavalry after the 108 Heroes are fully assembled. He participates in the campaigns against the Liao invaders and rebel forces in Song territory after the outlaws receive amnesty from Emperor Huizong.

During the final campaign against Fang La's rebel forces, Wei Dingguo and Shan Tinggui are assigned to attack Shezhou (present-day She County, Anhui), where they are lured into a trap. They fall into a concealed pit and get slain by enemy soldiers waiting in ambush.
