= Shan Tinggui =

Fictional character in the Chinese classical novel Water Margin

- Water Margin character
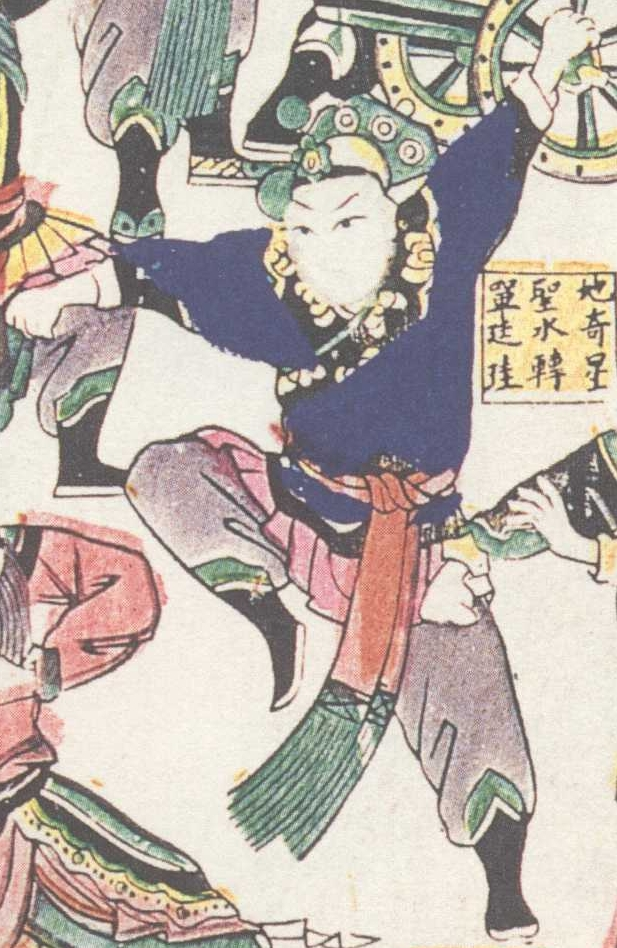
- a Qing dynasty illustration of Shan Tinggui
- First appearance: Chapter 67

In-universe information
- Nickname: "General of Sacred Water" 聖水將軍
- Weapon: black spear, bow and arrows
- Origin: military officer
- Designation: Tiger Cub Patrol Commander of Liangshan
- Rank: 44th, Unique Star (地奇星) of the 72 Earthly Fiends
- Ancestral home / Place of origin: Lingzhou (in present-day Dezhou, Shandong)

Chinese names
- Simplified Chinese: 单廷圭
- Traditional Chinese: 單廷珪
- Pinyin: Shàn Tíngguī
- Wade–Giles: Shan T'ing-kui

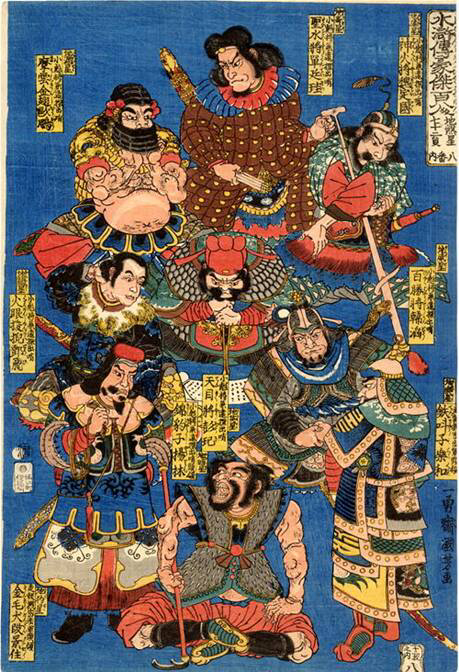
An illustration of nine of the 108 Heroes by Utagawa Kuniyoshi. Peng Qi is in the centre. The rest are (clockwise from top): Shan Tinggui, Wei Dingguo, Han Tao, Yue He, Yang Lin, Duan Jingzhu, Deng Fei, and Ou Peng.

Shan Tinggui is a fictional character in Water Margin, one of the Classic Chinese Novels. Nicknamed "General of Sacred Water", he ranks 44th among the 108 Heroes and eighth among the 72 Earthly Fiends.

== Background ==
Originally from Lingzhou (凌州; in present-day Dezhou, Shandong), Shan Tinggui serves as a military officer in his home prefecture alongside Wei Dingguo. A highly-skilled warrior, he rides a black stallion, and dons a suit of black armour and a helmet topped with a black feather. Wielding a long sabre, he is known for damming and diverting waterways in battle to flood enemies, supported by a 500-men unit whom he has trained in this form of warfare. As a result, he is nicknamed "General of Sacred Water".

== Battle of Lingzhou ==
Shan Tinggui and Wei Dingguo are first introduced in the novel when they are ordered by Grand Tutor Cai Jing to lead government forces from Lingzhou to destroy the outlaws at Liangshan Marsh.

Guan Sheng, a former military officer who has joined the outlaws, volunteers to lead Liangshan forces to engage the enemy at Lingzhou, with Hao Siwen and Xuan Zan serving as his lieutenants.

In their first clash, Hao Siwen and Xuan Zan are lured by Shan Tinggui and Wei Dingguo respectively into traps and end up being taken captive.

While Shan Tinggui and Wei Dingguo remain behind to fight Guan Sheng, they order their men to escort Hao Siwen and Xuan Zan in prison carts back to the capital. En route, the convoy is intercepted at Deadwood Hill (枯樹山) in Kouzhou (寇州; present-day Guan County, Shandong) by a group of outlaws led by Li Kui, Jiao Ting and Bao Xu. The two captives are freed and they work with the outlaws to stage an assault on Lingzhou.

== Becoming an outlaw ==
At Lingzhou, Guan Sheng challenges Shan Tinggui to a duel on horseback outside the city. Halfway during the duel, Guan Sheng feigns defeat and lures Shan Tinggui to chase him, and then catches him off guard with a surprise attack. Shan Tinggui, unable to parry or dodge the attack in time, is knocked off horseback and gets taken captive.

Guan Sheng treats Shan Tinggui respectfully, and manages to convince Shan to surrender and join the Liangshan outlaws as he did himself earlier. Later, Shan Tinggui and Guan Sheng also convince Wei Dingguo to surrender and join the outlaws.

== Campaigns and death ==
Shan Tinggui is appointed as a Tiger Cub Patrol Commander of the Liangshan cavalry after the 108 Heroes are fully assembled. He participates in the campaigns against the Liao invaders and rebel forces in Song territory after the outlaws receive amnesty from Emperor Huizong.

During the final campaign against Fang La's rebel forces, Shan Tinggui and Wei Dingguo are assigned to attack Shezhou (present-day She County, Anhui), where they are lured into a trap. They fall into a concealed pit and get slain by enemy soldiers waiting in ambush.
