= Ou Peng =

Fictional character in the Chinese classical novel Water Margin

- Water Margin character
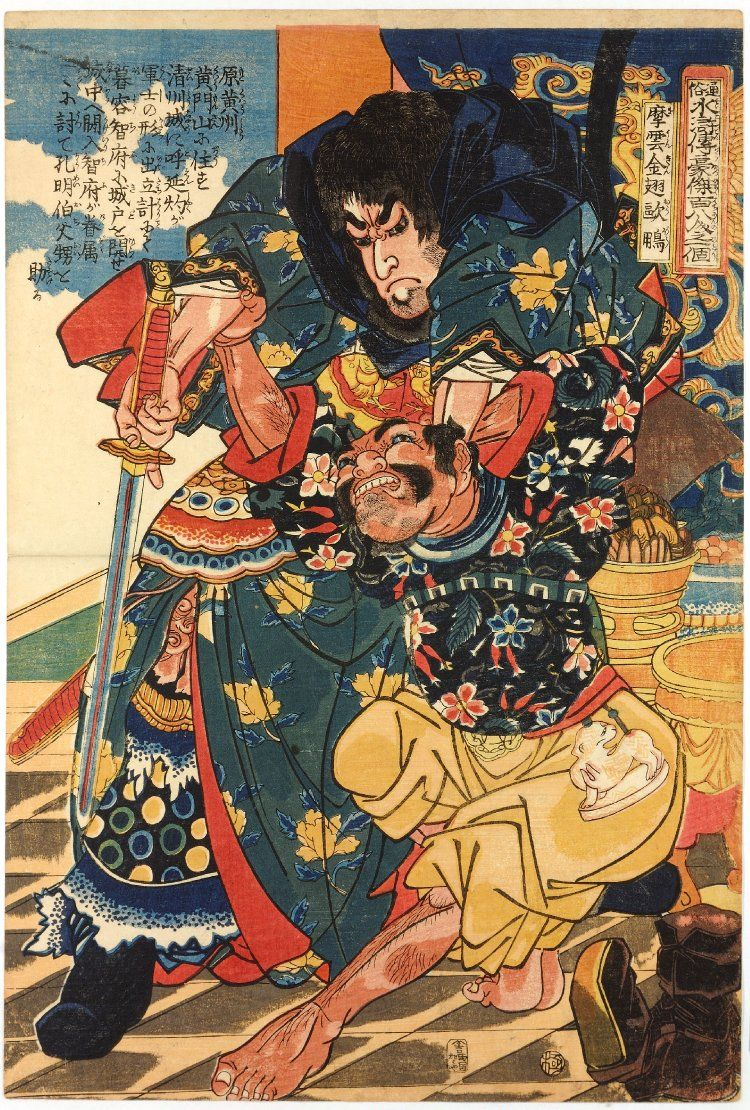
- an illustration of Ou Peng by Utagawa Kuniyoshi
- First appearance: Chapter 41

In-universe information
- Nickname: "Golden Wings Brushing Against the Clouds" 摩雲金翅
- Origin: outlaw
- Designation: Tiger Cub Patrol Commander of Liangshan
- Rank: 48th, Wide Star (地闊星) of the 72 Earthly Fiends
- Ancestral home / Place of origin: Huangzhou (in present-day Huanggang, Hubei)

Chinese names
- Simplified Chinese: 欧鹏
- Traditional Chinese: 歐鵬
- Pinyin: Ōu Péng
- Wade–Giles: Ou P'eng

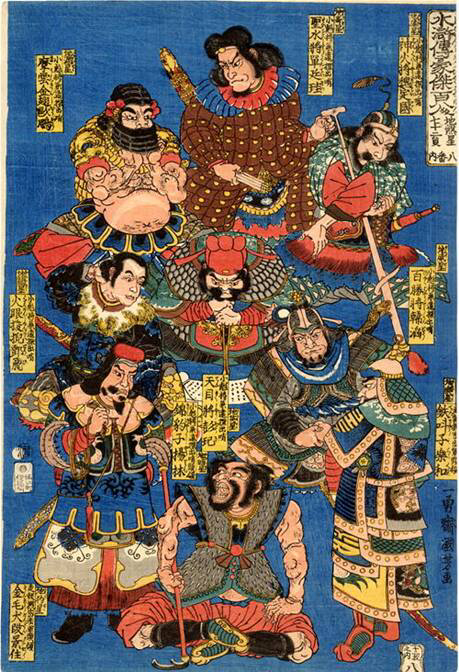
An illustration of nine of the 108 Heroes by Utagawa Kuniyoshi. Peng Qi is in the centre. The rest are (clockwise from top): Shan Tinggui, Wei Dingguo, Han Tao, Yue He, Yang Lin, Duan Jingzhu, Deng Fei, and Ou Peng.

Ou Peng is a fictional character in Water Margin, one of the Classic Chinese Novels. Nicknamed "Golden Wings Brushing Against the Clouds", he ranks 48th among the 108 Heroes and 12th among the 72 Earthly Fiends.

== Background ==
The novel describes Ou Peng as a tall and muscular man who is highly-skilled in martial arts. Nicknamed "Golden Wings Brushing Against the Clouds", he is best known for his ability to bare-handedly catch small projectiles in mid-flight.

Originally from Huangzhou (黃州; in present-day Huanggang, Hubei), Ou Peng comes from a family whose men have served as military officers at outposts along the Yangtze River for generations. He also starts out as such, but has been forced to resign after offending his superior.

== Joining Liangshan ==
Ou Peng is first introduced in the novel as one of four leaders of an outlaw group at Yellow Gate Hill (黃門山; in present-day She County, Anhui) along with Ma Lin, Tao Zongwang, and Jiang Jing.

When Song Jiang is following the outlaws of Liangshan Marsh back to their stronghold after they rescued him at Jiangzhou (江州; present-day Jiujiang, Jiangxi), they pass by Yellow Gate Hill. Ou Peng and the other three leaders stop the group and ask to speak to Song Jiang, whom they have heard of and admire, and request to join Liangshan. Song Jiang agrees and takes the Yellow Gate Hill outlaws with him to Liangshan.

When the Liangshan outlaws are attacking the Zhu Family Village, Ou Peng engages Hu Sanniang, then an ally of the Zhus, in a duel on horseback, and earns Song Jiang's praise for his skill in using the spear.

== Campaigns and death ==
Ou Peng is appointed as a Tiger Cub Patrol Commander of the Liangshan cavalry after the 108 Heroes are fully assembled. He participates in the campaigns against the Liao invaders and rebel forces in Song territory after the outlaws receive amnesty from Emperor Huizong.

During the final campaign against Fang La's rebel forces, Ou Peng is assigned to attack Shezhou (present-day She County, Anhui), where he encounters the enemy warrior Pang Wanchun, who is famous for his skill in archery. Pang Wanchun feigns defeat to lure Ou Peng to chase him, and then suddenly turns back and fires several arrows in succession. Ou Peng is able to catch the first few arrows mid-flight but increasingly finds it hard to keep up with Pang Wanchun's firing rate and eventually gets shot down.
