= Gong Wang =

Fictional character in the Chinese classical novel Water Margin

- Water Margin character
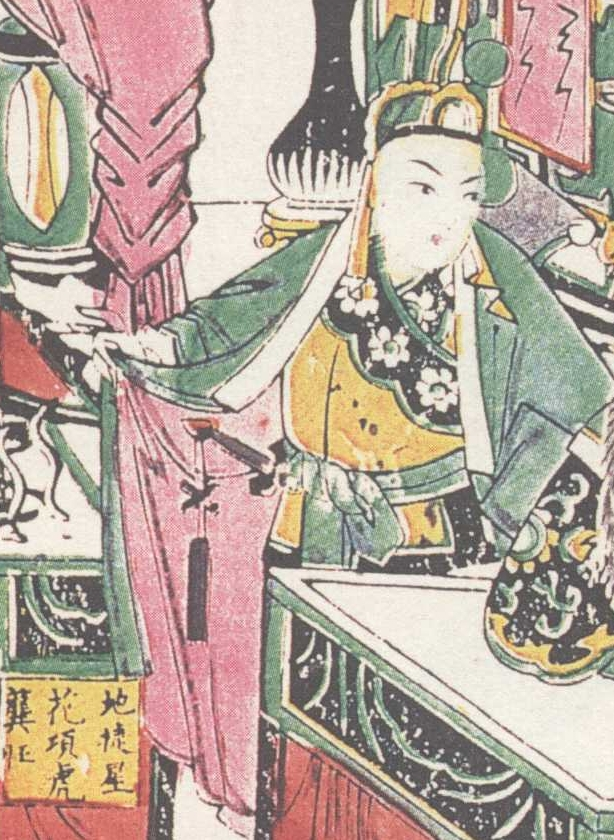
- a Qing dynasty illustration of Gong Wang
- First appearance: Chapter 70

In-universe information
- Nicknames: "Flowery-necked Tiger" 花項虎
- Weapon: javelin
- Origin: military officer
- Designation: Infantry Commander of Liangshan
- Rank: 78th, Victorious Star (地捷星) of the 72 Earthly Fiends

Chinese names
- Simplified Chinese: 龚旺
- Traditional Chinese: 龔旺
- Pinyin: Gōng Wàng
- Wade–Giles: Kung Wang

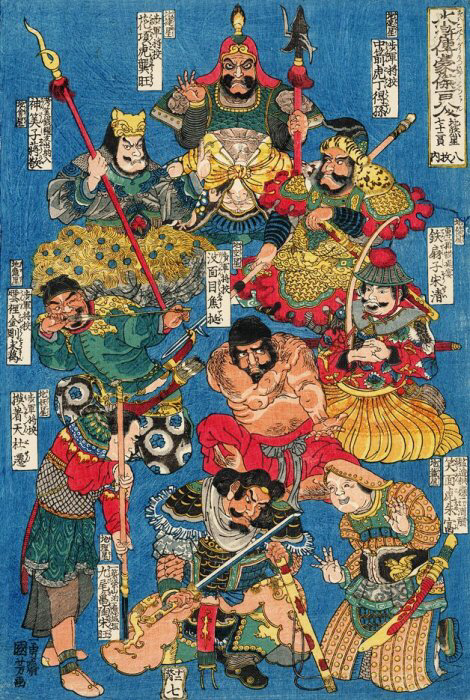
An illustration of nine of the 108 Heroes by Utagawa Kuniyoshi. Clockwise from top: Gong Wang, Ding Desun, Song Qing, Jiao Ting, Zhu Fu, Tao Zongwang, Du Qian, Song Wan, and Jiang Jing.

Gong Wang is a fictional character in Water Margin, one of the Classic Chinese Novels. Nicknamed "Flowery-necked Tiger", he ranks 78th among the 108 Heroes and 42nd among the 72 Earthly Fiends.

== Background ==
Gong Wang is nicknamed "Flowery-necked Tiger" because he has tattoos of tiger's stripes on his body and a tattoo of a tiger's head on his neck. A skilled warrior, he specialises in using javelins. He and Ding Desun serve as the lieutenants of Zhang Qing, a military officer stationed in Dongchang Prefecture (東昌府; in present-day Liaocheng, Shandong).

== Becoming an outlaw ==
When the outlaws from Liangshan Marsh attack Dongchang Prefecture, Zhang Qing, flanked by Gong Wang and Ding Desun, leads his troops out to engage the enemy. Zhang Qing uses his deadly stone-flinging skill to defeat several of Liangshan's best fighters on horseback and on foot. Each time he takes down his opponent, Gong Wang and Ding Desun will charge forward and attempt to take his opponent captive.

At one point, Zhang Qing and Dong Ping duel on horseback and start grappling with each other after discarding their weapons. Gong Wang moves in to intercept Liangshan's Lin Chong and Hua Rong when they attempt to join the fray to help Dong Ping, but he is no match for the two and ends up being captured. Meanwhile, Ding Desun is captured too by Liangshan's Lü Fang and Guo Sheng. Zhang Qing ultimately falls into a trap and gets taken captive by the outlaws. He decides to surrender and join the outlaws; Gong Wang and Ding Desun follow suit.

== Campaigns and death ==
Gong Wang is appointed as a commander of the Liangshan infantry after the 108 Heroes are fully assembled. He participates in the campaigns against the Liao invaders and rebel forces in Song territory after the outlaws receive amnesty from Emperor Huizong.

During the final campaign against Fang La's rebel forces, Gong Wang is assigned to attack Deqing County, where he encounters the enemy warrior Huang Ai (黄愛) and duels him. As Huang Ai retreats, Gong Wang pursues him but misses his step and falls into a stream, where he is speared to death by enemy soldiers.
