= Song Wan (Water Margin) =

Fictional character in the Chinese classical novel Water Margin

- Water Margin character
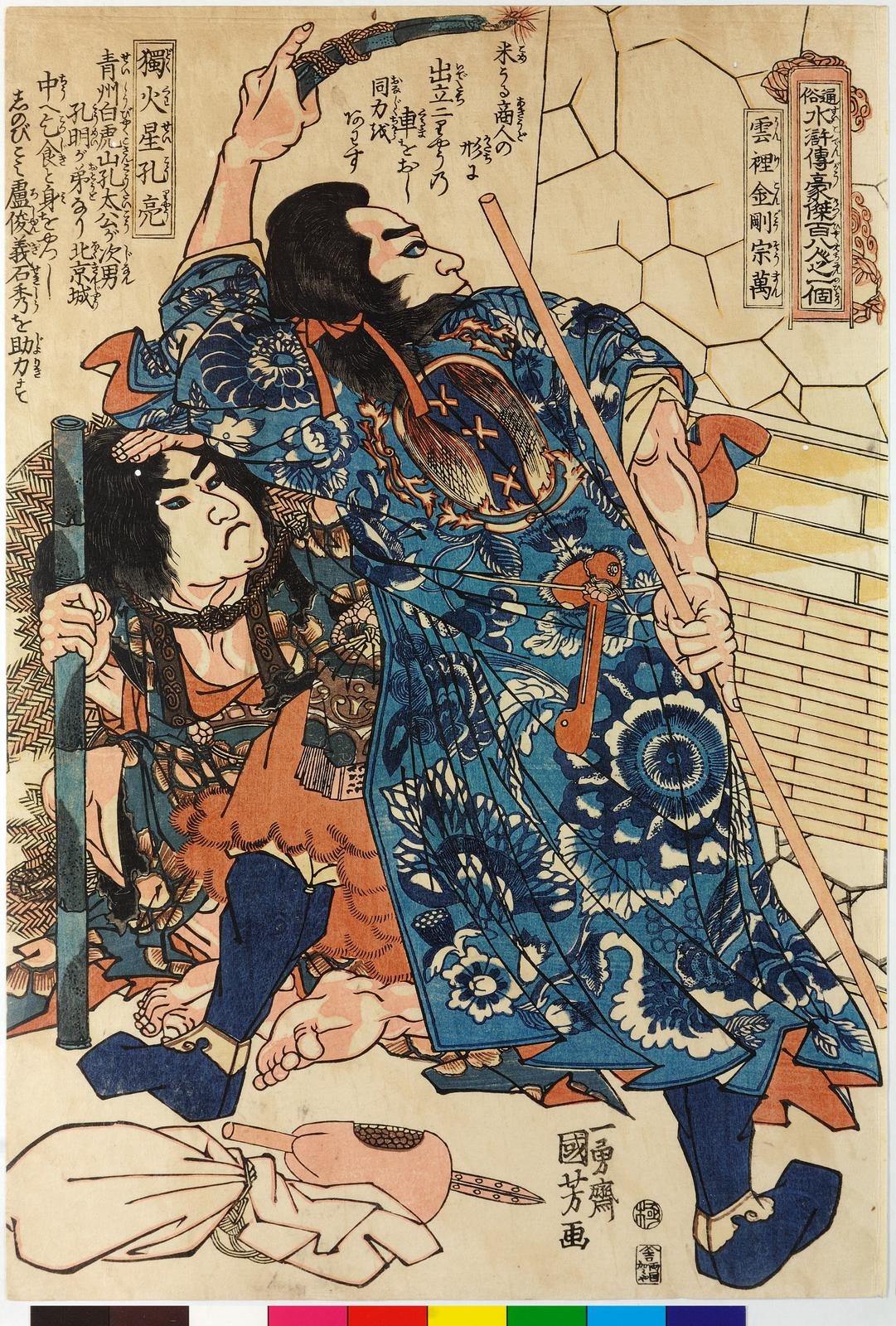
- an illustration of Song Wan by Utagawa Kuniyoshi
- First appearance: Chapter 11

In-universe information
- Nickname: "Giant in the Clouds" 雲裏金剛
- Origin: outlaw
- Designation: Infantry Commander of Liangshan
- Rank: 82nd, Devil Star (地魔星) of the 72 Earthly Fiends

Chinese names
- Simplified Chinese: 宋万
- Traditional Chinese: 宋萬
- Pinyin: Sòng Wàn
- Wade–Giles: Sung Wan

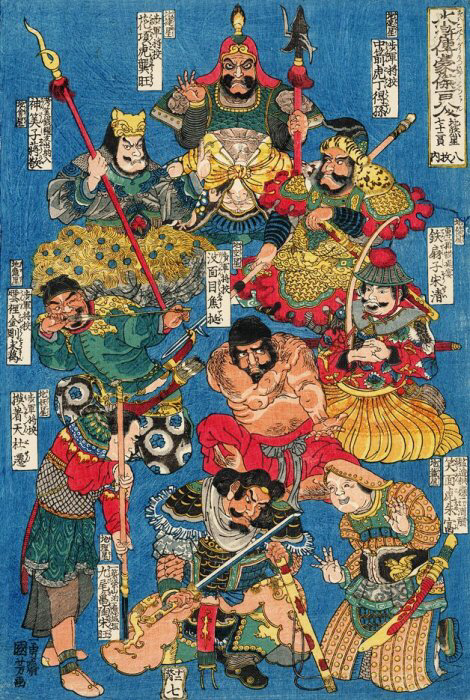
An illustration of nine of the 108 Heroes by Utagawa Kuniyoshi. Clockwise from top: Gong Wang, Ding Desun, Song Qing, Jiao Ting, Zhu Fu, Tao Zongwang, Du Qian, Song Wan, and Jiang Jing.

Song Wan is a fictional character in Water Margin, one of the Classic Chinese Novels. Nicknamed "Giant in the Clouds", he ranks 82nd among the 108 Heroes and 46th among the 72 Earthly Fiends.

== Background ==
Song Wan is first mentioned in the novel as one of the three leaders of an outlaw band based at Liangshan Marsh, taking the third position of leadership after Wang Lun and Du Qian.

== Lin Chong joins Liangshan ==
When Lin Chong comes to seek shelter at Liangshan after being forced to become an outlaw, Wang Lun tries to send him away with excuses and gifts as he fears that Lin, with his superior fighting skills, might usurp his position as chief of the outlaw band. Song Wan and Du Qian, who are more welcoming towards Lin Chong, urge Wang Lun to accept the newcomer. Wang Lun grudgingly agrees after Lin Chong attempts to kill Yang Zhi, another highly-skilled warrior, to prove his determination to join the outlaws.

== Chao Gai becomes chief of Liangshan ==
In a later chapter, Chao Gai and his six friends rob a convoy of valuable birthday gifts for the corrupt official Cai Jing, and come to take shelter at Liangshan. Again, Wang Lun fears that the group will pose a threat to his position as the outlaw band's chief, so he tries to send them away with gifts and excuses in the same way he did to Lin Chong.

Wu Yong, one of Chao Gai's six friends, senses that Lin Chong already holds a grudge against Wang Lun. While Wu Yong instigates Lin Chong to kill Wang Lun, the others deliberately block Song Wan and Du Qian from interfering. After Wang Lun's death, Lin Chong nominates the charismatic Chao Gai to be the new chief of the outlaw band. Song Wan and Du Qian, left with no choice, accept the outcome and pledge allegiance to Chao Gai.

== Campaigns and death ==
Song Wan is appointed as a commander of the Liangshan infantry after the 108 Heroes are fully assembled. He participates in the campaigns against the Liao invaders and rebel forces in Song territory after the outlaws receive amnesty from Emperor Huizong.

During the final campaign against Fang La's rebel forces, Song Wan is assigned to attack Runzhou (潤州; in present-day Zhenjiang, Jiangsu). He falls after being hit by a stray arrow during the battle, and ends up being trampled to death by enemy cavalry. After the campaign is over, the emperor honours Song Wan for his contributions by awarding him the posthumous title "Righteous Gentleman of Integrity" (義節郎).
