= Deng Fei =

Fictional character in the Chinese classical novel Water Margin

- Water Margin character
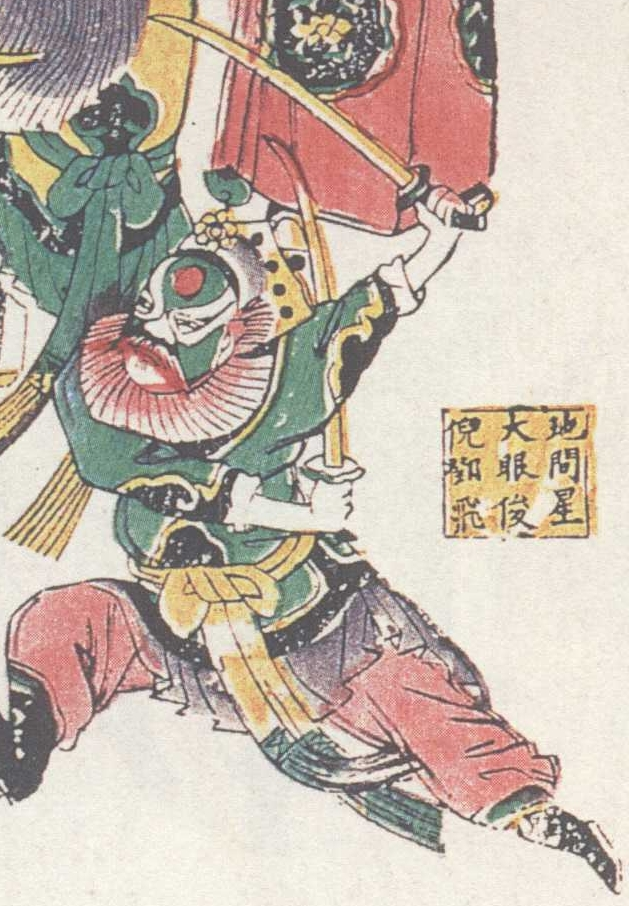
- a Qing dynasty illustration of Deng Fei
- First appearance: Chapter 44

In-universe information
- Nickname: "Fiery Eyed Suanni (Note: The Suanni (狻猊) is a lion-like creature in Chinese mythology. It is one of the nine descendants of the Dragon.)" 火眼狻猊
- Weapon: iron chain with spikes
- Origin: outlaw
- Designation: Tiger Cub Patrol Commander of Liangshan
- Rank: 49th, Whole Star (地闔星) of the 72 Earthly Fiends
- Ancestral home / Place of origin: Xiangyang, Hubei

Chinese names
- Simplified Chinese: 邓飞
- Traditional Chinese: 鄧飛
- Pinyin: Dèng Fēi
- Wade–Giles: Teng Fei

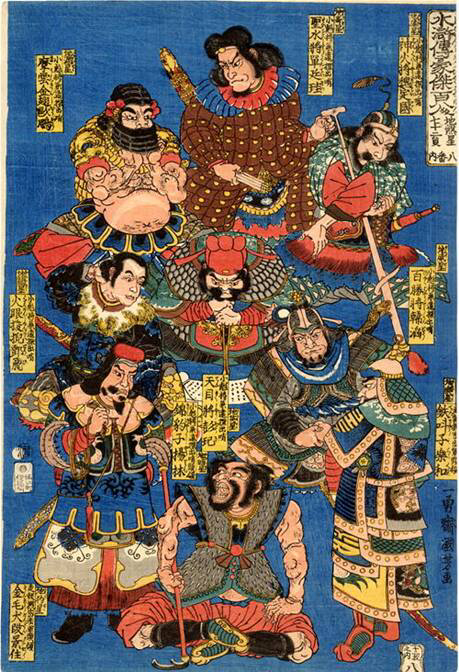
An illustration of nine of the 108 Heroes by Utagawa Kuniyoshi. Peng Qi is in the centre. The rest are (clockwise from top): Shan Tinggui, Wei Dingguo, Han Tao, Yue He, Yang Lin, Duan Jingzhu, Deng Fei, and Ou Peng.

Deng Fei is a fictional character in Water Margin, one of the Classic Chinese Novels. Nicknamed "Fiery Eyed Suanni", he ranks 49th among the 108 Heroes and 13th among the 72 Earthly Fiends.

== Background ==
Originally from Xiangyang, Deng Fei is nicknamed "Fiery Eyed Suanni" due to his bloodshot eyes. A highly-skilled fighter, he uses a long iron chain with spikes in combat.

Deng Fei is first introduced in the novel as the second of three leaders of a small outlaw group based at Yinma River (飲馬川; in present-day Jizhou, Tianjin), ranking between Pei Xuan and Meng Kang.

== Joining Liangshan ==
Deng Fei, along with Pei Xuan and Meng Kang, makes his first appearance in the novel when they are introduced by Yang Lin, an old acquaintance of Deng Fei, to Dai Zong when he passes by Yinma River on his way to find Gongsun Sheng in Jizhou (薊州; present-day Jizhou, Tianjin).

Dai Zong, who is already part of the outlaw band at Liangshan Marsh, invites Yang Lin and the outlaws at Yinma River to join Liangshan, and they accept.

== Campaigns and death ==
Deng Fei is appointed as a Tiger Cub Patrol Commander of the Liangshan cavalry after the 108 Heroes are fully assembled. He participates in their campaigns against the Liao invaders and rebel forces in Song territory after the outlaws receive amnesty from Emperor Huizong.

During the final campaign against Fang La's rebel forces, Deng Fei, Suo Chao and other Liangshan heroes are assigned to assault the north gate at the battle of Hangzhou. After Suo Chao is slain by the enemy warrior Shi Bao, Deng Fei attempts to avenge his fallen comrade but is no match for Shi Bao and ends up getting sliced in two.
