= Zhu Fu =

Fictional character in the Chinese classical novel Water Margin

- Water Margin character
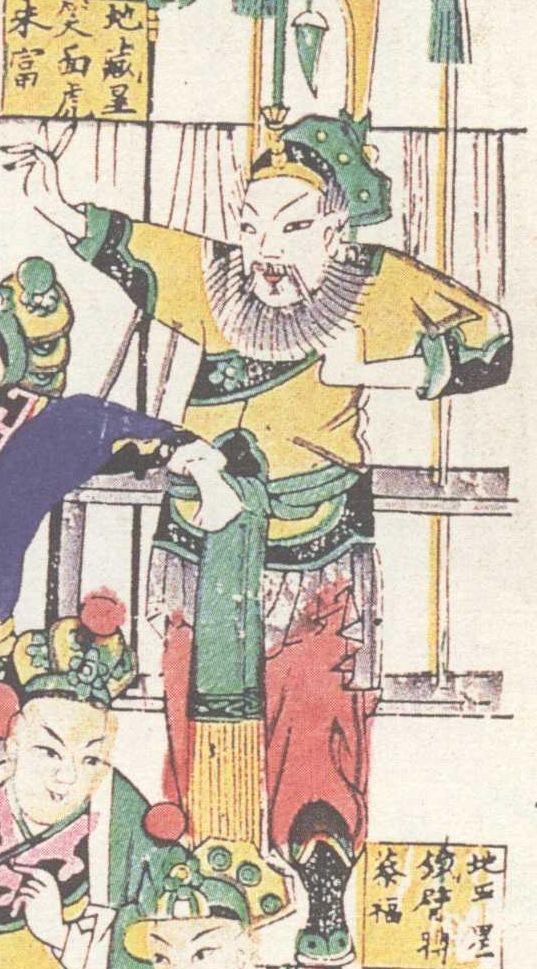
- a Qing dynasty illustration of Zhu Fu
- First appearance: Chapter 43

In-universe information
- Nicknames: "Sneering Tiger" 笑面虎
- Origin: tavern owner
- Designation: Brewery Master of Liangshan
- Rank: 93rd, Hidden Star (地藏星) of the 72 Earthly Fiends
- Ancestral home / Place of origin: Yishui County (in present-day Linyi, Shandong)

Chinese names
- Simplified Chinese: 朱富
- Traditional Chinese: 朱富
- Pinyin: Zhū Fù
- Wade–Giles: Chu Fu

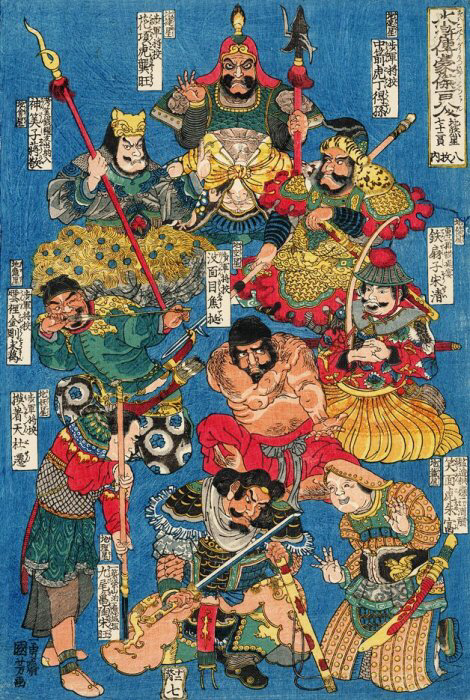
An illustration of nine of the 108 Heroes by Utagawa Kuniyoshi. Clockwise from top: Gong Wang, Ding Desun, Song Qing, Jiao Ting, Zhu Fu, Tao Zongwang, Du Qian, Song Wan, and Jiang Jing.

Zhu Fu is a fictional character in Water Margin, one of the Classic Chinese Novels. Nicknamed "Sneering Tiger", he ranks 93rd among the 108 Heroes and 57th among the 72 Earthly Fiends.

== Background ==
Zhu Fu is the younger brother of Zhu Gui, one of the early members of the outlaw band at the Liangshan Marsh. He runs a tavern in his hometown, Yishui County (in present-day Shandong), and has been trained in martial arts by Li Yun, a chief constable in Yishui County.

== Saving Li Kui ==
Zhu Fu first appears in the novel when he and his brother Zhu Gui are secretly instructed by the Liangshan outlaws to keep an eye on their fellow outlaw Li Kui, who has returned to his home village in Yishui County to fetch his mother. Li Kui kills four tigers in revenge after they killed and ate his mother, and takes shelter in the residence of Squire Cao, a wealthy man in the nearby town who secretly finds out who Li Kui is and plots to capture him to collect the bounty on his head.

Still grieving over his mother's death, Li Kui lets his guard down and consumes drinks spiked with menghanyao (蒙汗藥), causing him to feel dizzy and become unconscious. While he is out cold, Squire Cao ties him up and informs Yishui County's magistrate, who sends Li Yun and his men to come to escort Li Kui back to the administrative office.

En route, Li Kui regains consciousness and realises he is a prisoner. Luckily for him, Zhu Fu and Zhu Gui have already heard of his capture, and have come up with a plan to save him. Zhu Fu, being Li Yun's apprentice, intercepts the group and pretends to offer them refreshments to congratulate his master on capturing a wanted outlaw. Li Yun and the others unsuspectingly consume the drinks, which have been spiked with menghanyao, and get knocked out. The Zhu brothers then free Li Kui, who kills Squire Cao and all of Li Yun's men. When Li Kui is about to kill Li Yun as well, Zhu Fu stops him, saying that his master is a good man. Li Kui then leaves with the Zhu brothers.

When Li Yun comes to, he realises what has happened and goes off in pursuit of the three men. He catches up with them and fights with Li Kui, but Zhu Fu stops the fight, telling him of the Liangshan outlaws' mission to "deliver justice on Heaven's behalf". Convinced that the Liangshan cause is a righteous one and seeing that it is impossible for him to continue working in Yishui County, Li Yun grudgingly accepts his fate and joins the Liangshan outlaws.

== Campaigns and death ==
Zhu Fu is appointed as Liangshan's brewery master and put in charge of overseeing the preparation of food and beverages after the 108 Heroes are fully assembled. He participates in the campaigns against the Liao invaders and rebel forces in Song territory after the outlaws receive amnesty from Emperor Huizong.

During the final campaign against Fang La's rebel forces, Zhu Gui falls sick after the Liangshan forces capture Hangzhou, so Zhu Fu remains behind in Hangzhou to take care of his brother and does not participate in the remaining battles. Zhu Gui dies of illness shortly after, while Zhu Fu also catches the same disease and soon succumbs to it as well, not living to see the Liangshan heroes' final victory over Fang La.
