= Tao Zongwang =

Fictional character in the Chinese classical novel Water Margin

- Water Margin character
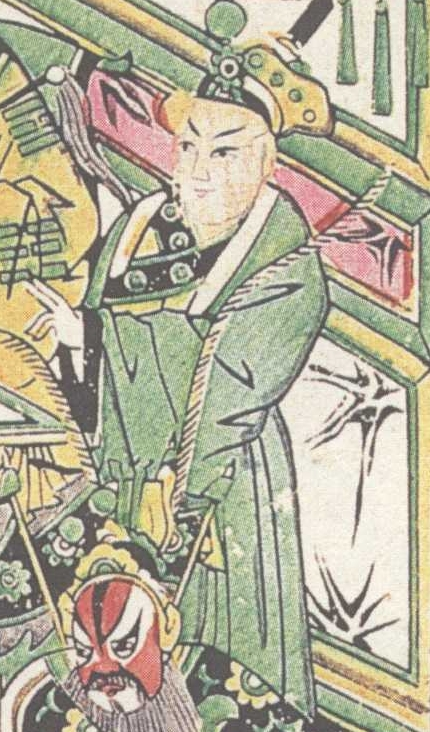
- a Qing dynasty illustration of Tao Zongwang
- First appearance: Chapter 41

In-universe information
- Nickname: "Nine-tailed Turtle" 九尾龜
- Weapon: iron shovel
- Origin: outlaw
- Designation: Construction Supervisor of Liangshan
- Rank: 75th, Manage Star (地理星) of the 72 Earthly Fiends
- Ancestral home / Place of origin: Guangzhou (around present-day Huangchuan County, Henan)

Chinese names
- Simplified Chinese: 陶宗旺
- Traditional Chinese: 陶宗旺
- Pinyin: Táo Zōngwàng
- Wade–Giles: T'ao Tsung-wang

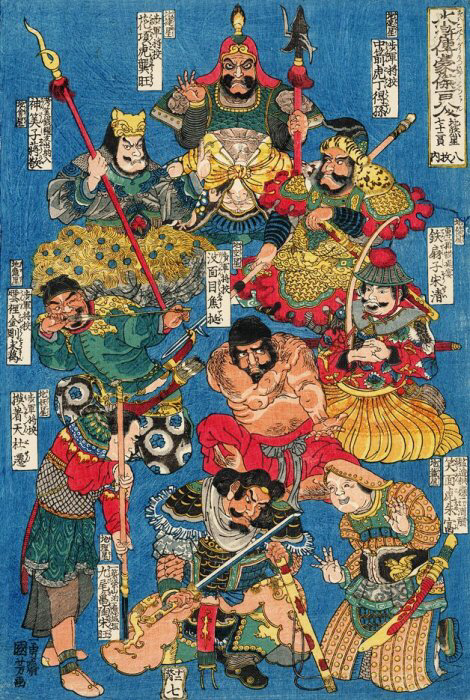
An illustration of nine of the 108 Heroes by Utagawa Kuniyoshi. Clockwise from top: Gong Wang, Ding Desun, Song Qing, Jiao Ting, Zhu Fu, Tao Zongwang, Du Qian, Song Wan, and Jiang Jing.

Tao Zongwang is a fictional character in Water Margin, one of the Classic Chinese Novels. Nicknamed "Nine-tailed Turtle", he ranks 75th among the 108 Heroes and 39th among the 72 Earthly Fiends.

== Background ==
Born in a peasant family in Guangzhou (光州; around present-day Huangchuan County, Henan), Tao Zongwang is nicknamed "Nine-tailed Turtle" for his physical strength and fighting skills, particularly the use of the spear and the sword.

== Joining Liangshan ==
Tao Zongwang is first introduced in the novel as one of four leaders of an outlaw group at Yellow Gate Hill (黃門山; in present-day She County, Anhui) along with Ou Peng, Jiang Jing, and Ma Lin.

When Song Jiang is following the outlaws of Liangshan Marsh back to their stronghold after they rescued him at Jiangzhou (江州; present-day Jiujiang, Jiangxi), they pass by Yellow Gate Hill. Tao Zongwang and the other three leaders stop the group and ask to speak to Song Jiang, whom they have heard of and admire, and request to join Liangshan. Song Jiang agrees and takes the Yellow Gate Hill outlaws with him to Liangshan.

== Campaigns and death ==
Tao Zongwang is placed in charge of supervising the construction of forts and defensive structures at Liangshan after the 108 Heroes are fully assembled. He participates in the campaigns against the Liao invaders and rebel forces in Song territory after the outlaws receive amnesty from Emperor Huizong.

During the final campaign against Fang La's rebel forces, Tao Zongwang is stuck by stray arrows at the battle of Runzhou (潤州; present-day Runzhou District, Zhenjiang, Jiangsu) and trampled to death by enemy cavalry.
