= Peng Qi =

Fictional character in the Chinese classical novel Water Margin

- Water Margin character
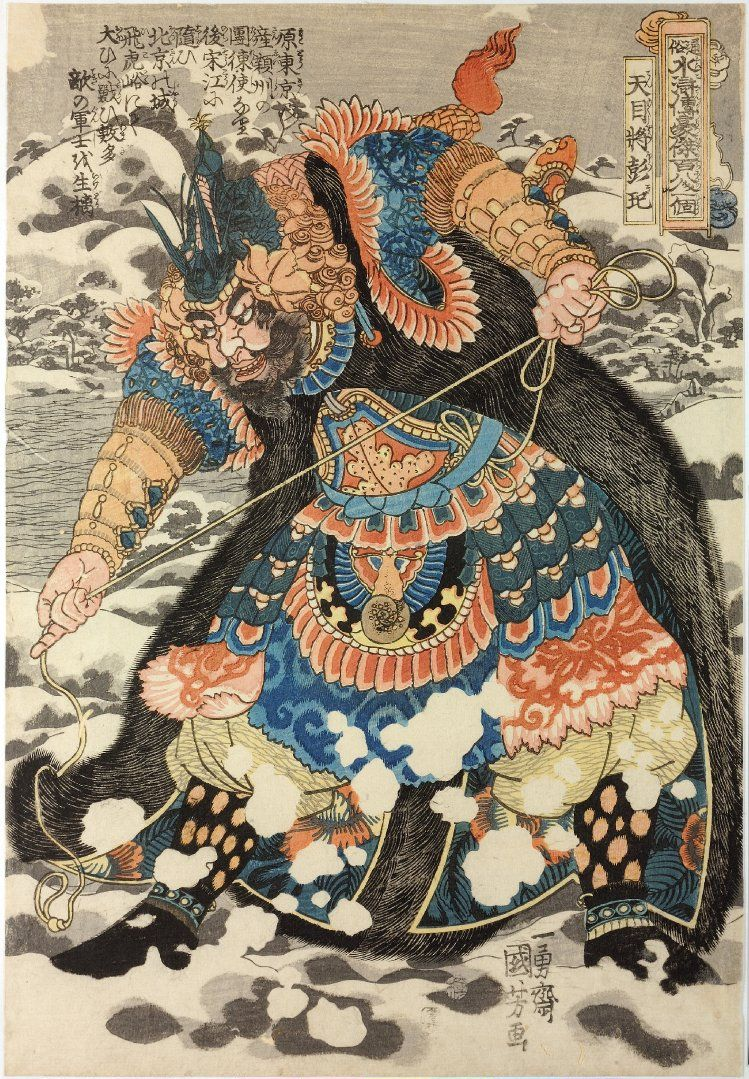
- an illustration of Peng Qi by Utagawa Kuniyoshi
- First appearance: Chapter 55

In-universe information
- Nickname: "General of Heavenly Vision" 天目將
- Weapon: trident with three spikes and two blades (三尖兩刃刀)
- Origin: military officer
- Designation: Tiger Cub Patrol Commander of Liangshan
- Rank: 43rd, Hero Star (地英星) of the 72 Earthly Fiends
- Ancestral home / Place of origin: Dongjing (present-day Kaifeng, Henan)

Chinese names
- Simplified Chinese: 彭玘
- Traditional Chinese: 彭玘
- Pinyin: Péng Qǐ
- Wade–Giles: P'eng Ch'i

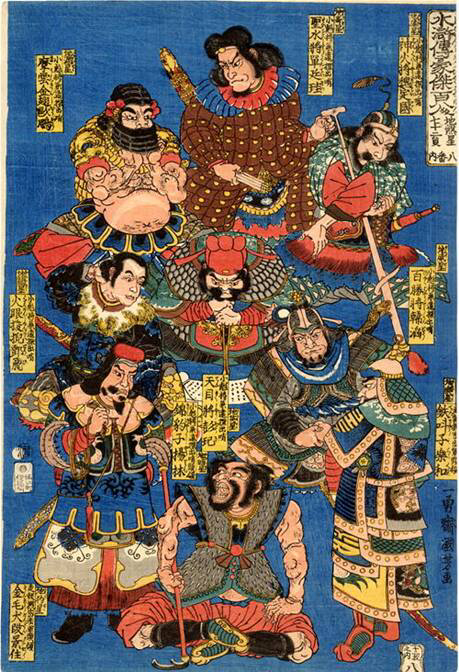
An illustration of nine of the 108 Heroes by Utagawa Kuniyoshi. Peng Qi is in the centre. The rest are (clockwise from top): Shan Tinggui, Wei Dingguo, Han Tao, Yue He, Yang Lin, Duan Jingzhu, Deng Fei, and Ou Peng.

Peng Qi is a fictional character in Water Margin, one of the Classic Chinese Novels. Nicknamed "General of Heavenly Vision", he ranks 43rd among the 108 Heroes and seventh among the 72 Earthly Fiends.

== Background ==
Originally from the capital Dongjing (東京; present-day Kaifeng, Henan), Peng Qi hails from a family who has served in the army for generations. He starts out as a military officer in Yingzhou (潁州; around present-day Fuyang, Anhui). A highly-skilled warrior who uses a trident with three spikes and two blades (三尖兩刃刀), he is nicknamed "General of Heavenly Vision" as an allusion to the deity Erlang Shen who wields a similar weapon.

== Becoming an outlaw ==
Peng Qi is first introduced in the novel when the Song government is discussing how to deal with the outlaws at Liangshan Marsh after they attacked and captured Gaotangzhou (高唐州; present-day Gaotang County, Shandong). Along with Han Tao, Peng Qi is appointed as a lieutenant of Huyan Zhuo, who is tasked with leading government forces to destroy the outlaws.

In their first battle against Liangshan, Peng Qi engages Hu Sanniang in a duel on horseback. Caught by surprise when she uses her lasso, he gets pulled off horseback and ends up being captured by the outlaws.

The outlaws treat Peng Qi respectfully and manage to convince him to surrender and join them in their righteous cause of "upholding justice on Heaven's behalf". Peng Qi later helps the outlaws convince Ling Zhen, Han Tao, and Huyan Zhuo to surrender and join Liangshan too after they are defeated and captured.

== Campaigns and death ==
Peng Qi is appointed as a Tiger Cub Patrol Commander of the Liangshan cavalry after the 108 Heroes are fully assembled. He participates in the campaigns against the Liao invaders and rebel forces in Song territory after the outlaws receive amnesty from Emperor Huizong.

During the final campaign against Fang La's rebel forces, Peng Qi and Han Tao are assigned to attack Changzhou, where they face the enemy warriors Gao Keli and Zhang Jinren. After Han Tao is killed by Zhang Jinren, Peng Qi attempts to avenge his fallen comrade but gets fatally speared in the side by Zhang Jinren.
