= Song Qing =

Song Qing is the name of:

- Song Qing (Qing dynasty) (1820–1902), Qing dynasty general
- Song Qing (Water Margin), fictional Song dynasty hero in the Chinese novel Water Margin
