= Song Qing (Water Margin) =

Fictional character in the Chinese classical novel Water Margin

- Water Margin character
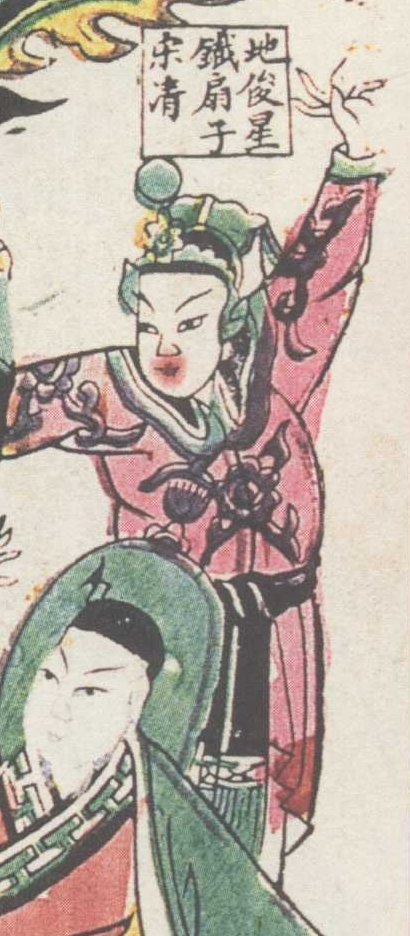
- a Qing dynasty illustration of Song Qing
- First appearance: Chapter 18

In-universe information
- Nickname: "Iron Fan" 鐵扇子
- Origin: farmer
- Designation: Banquet Organiser of Liangshan
- Rank: 76th, Handsome Star (地俊星) of the 72 Earthly Fiends
- Ancestral home / Place of origin: Yuncheng County, Shandong

Chinese names
- Simplified Chinese: 宋清
- Traditional Chinese: 宋清
- Pinyin: Sòng Qīng
- Wade–Giles: Sung Ch'ing

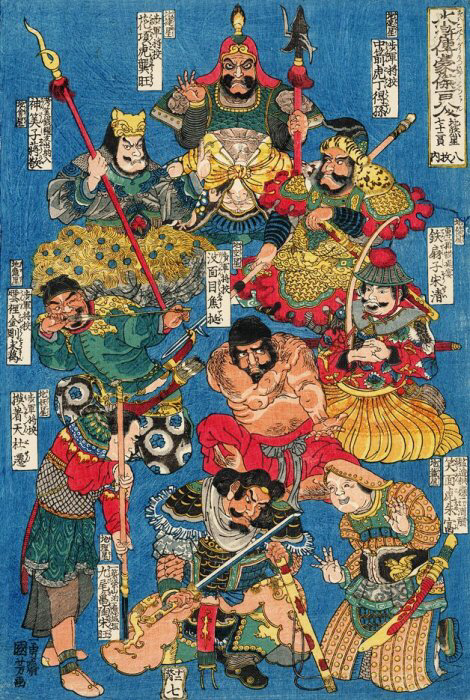
An illustration of nine of the 108 Heroes by Utagawa Kuniyoshi. Clockwise from top: Gong Wang, Ding Desun, Song Qing, Jiao Ting, Zhu Fu, Tao Zongwang, Du Qian, Song Wan, and Jiang Jing.

Song Qing is a fictional character in Water Margin, one of the Classic Chinese Novels. Nicknamed "Iron Fan", he ranks 76th among the 108 Heroes and 40th among the 72 Earthly Fiends.

== Background ==
Born in Yuncheng County (in present-day Shandong), Song Qing is the younger brother of Song Jiang, who serves as a clerk in the administrative office under the county magistrate. While his brother is famous in the jianghu for his chivalry and generosity, Song Qing keeps a low profile and spends his time taking care of their family and working as a simple farmer.

== Tricking Song Jiang to come home ==
At one point, Song Jiang flees Yuncheng County after killing Yan Poxi, who had discovered his connections to the outlaws at Liangshan Marsh and had threatened to report him to the authorities. As time passes, Song Jiang's father misses his son and worries that Song Jiang might do something to tarnish the Song family's good name, so he tells Song Qing to help him fake his death and trick Song Jiang into coming home.

Song Qing then writes a letter to his brother, lying that their father has passed away and urging him to come home for the funeral. Shi Yong helps Song Qing deliver the letter to Song Jiang, who is devastated after reading the letter. When Song Jiang finally comes home, he is shocked to find his father alive and well.

== Becoming an outlaw ==
News of Song Jiang's return quickly reach the authorities, who send soldiers to apprehend him for the murder of Yan Poxi. Despite Song Qing urging him to flee again, this time, Song Jiang refuses to run and allows himself to be arrested and put on trial. Considering Song Jiang's past service, the magistrate spares him the death penalty and instead sentences him to face-tattooing and exiles him to a prison camp in Jiangzhou (江州; present-day Jiujiang, Jiangxi).

After getting into trouble in Jiangzhou and nearly losing his life, Song Jiang is saved by his outlaw friends from Liangshan Marsh and becomes the second-in-command of the outlaw band after the chief Chao Gai. He then sneaks back to Yuncheng County and fetches his family to join him at Liangshan; Song Qing also becomes an outlaw.

== Campaigns and later life ==
Song Qing is placed in charge of organising banquets at Liangshan after the 108 Heroes are fully assembled. He participates in the campaigns against the Liao invaders and rebel forces in Song territory after the outlaws receive amnesty from Emperor Huizong.

The final campaign against Fang La's rebel forces costs the lives of nearly two-thirds of the 108 Heroes; Song Qing is one of the few survivors. To honour Song Qing for his contributions during the campaigns, the emperor confers on him the honorary title "Martial Gentleman of Grace" (武奕郎) and offers him an official appointment. However, Song Qing declines and chooses to return to Yuncheng County to live as a farmer.

Song Qing's son, Song Anping (宋安平), passes the imperial examination and serves as an official in the Song government.
