= Yang Lin =

Yang Lin may refer to:

- Yang Lin (Water Margin), a fictional character in the Water Margin
- Yang Lin (footballer), Chinese footballer
