= Jiang Jing (Water Margin) =

Fictional character in the Chinese classical novel Water Margin

- Water Margin character
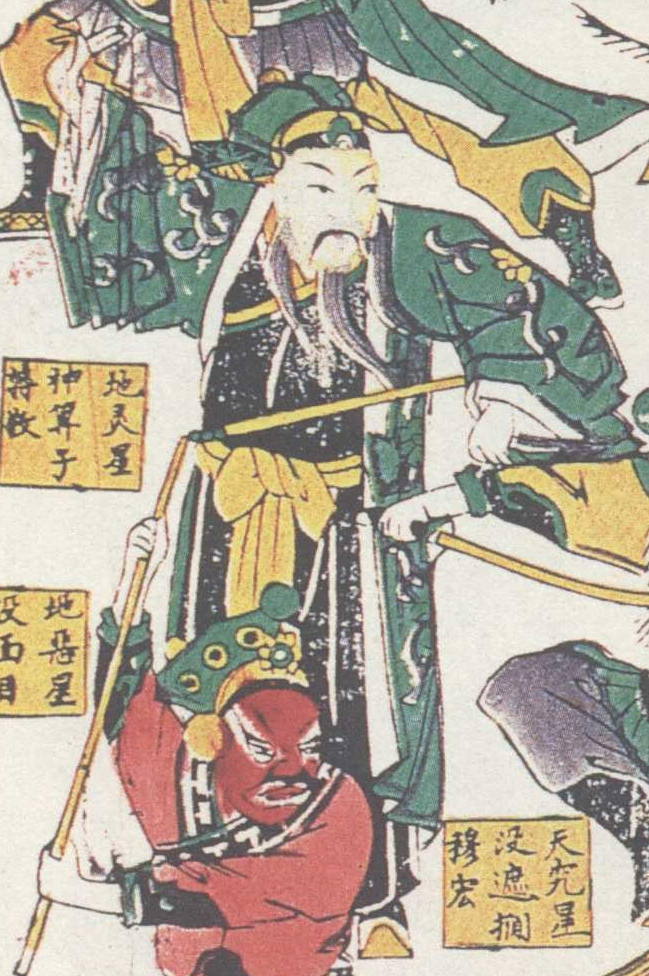
- a Qing dynasty illustration of Jiang Jing
- First appearance: Chapter 41

In-universe information
- Nickname: "Divine Mathematician" 神算子
- Origin: outlaw
- Designation: Accountant of Liangshan
- Rank: 53rd, Meet Star (地會星) of the 72 Earthly Fiends
- Ancestral home / Place of origin: Tanzhou (around present-day Changsha, Hunan)

Chinese names
- Simplified Chinese: 蒋敬
- Traditional Chinese: 蔣敬
- Pinyin: Jiǎng Jìng
- Wade–Giles: Chiang Ching

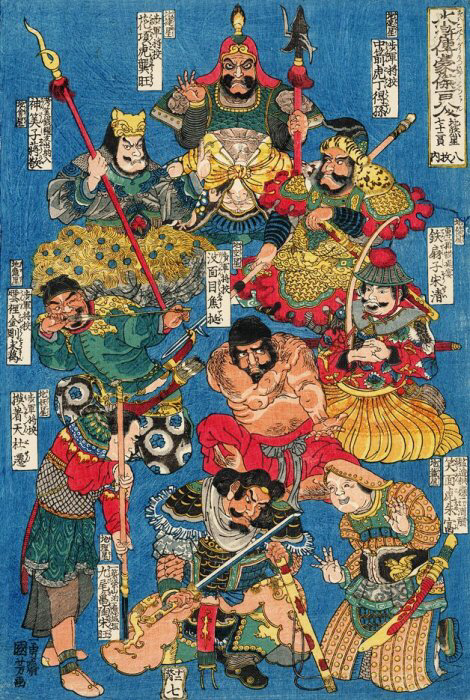
An illustration of nine of the 108 Heroes by Utagawa Kuniyoshi. Clockwise from top: Gong Wang, Ding Desun, Song Qing, Jiao Ting, Zhu Fu, Tao Zongwang, Du Qian, Song Wan, and Jiang Jing.

Jiang Jing is a fictional character in Water Margin, one of the Classic Chinese Novels. Nicknamed "Divine Mathematician," he ranks 53rd among the 108 Heroes and 17th among the 72 Earthly Fiends.

== Background ==
Originally from Tanzhou (潭州; around present-day Changsha, Hunan), Jiang Jing is formerly a Confucian scholar who has repeatedly taken the imperial examination but has never been a successful candidate. Frustrated and disappointed, he shifts to his focus from traditional scholarly arts to mathematics, martial arts, and military-related subjects. Over time, he earns himself the nickname "Divine Mathematician" for his expertise in mathematics.

== Joining Liangshan ==
Jiang Jing is first introduced in the novel as one of four leaders of an outlaw group at Yellow Gate Hill (黃門山; in present-day She County, Anhui) along with Ou Peng, Tao Zongwang, and Ma Lin.

When Song Jiang is following the outlaws of Liangshan Marsh back to their stronghold after they rescued him at Jiangzhou (江州; present-day Jiujiang, Jiangxi), they pass by Yellow Gate Hill. Jiang Jing and the other three leaders stop the group and ask to speak to Song Jiang, whom they have heard of and admire, and request to join Liangshan. Song Jiang agrees and takes the Yellow Gate Hill outlaws with him to Liangshan.

== Campaigns ==
Jang Jing is appointed as an accountant at Liangshan to keep stock of finances and logistics after the 108 Heroes are fully assembled. He participates in campaigns against the Liao invaders and rebel forces in Song territory after the outlaws receive amnesty from Emperor Huizong.

Jiang Jing is one of the Liangshan heroes who survive all the campaigns. Although he is offered an official appointment by the emperor to honour him for his contributions, he declines and returns to his hometown to live as a commoner.
