= Yang Lin (Water Margin) =

Fictional character in the Chinese classical novel Water Margin

- Water Margin character
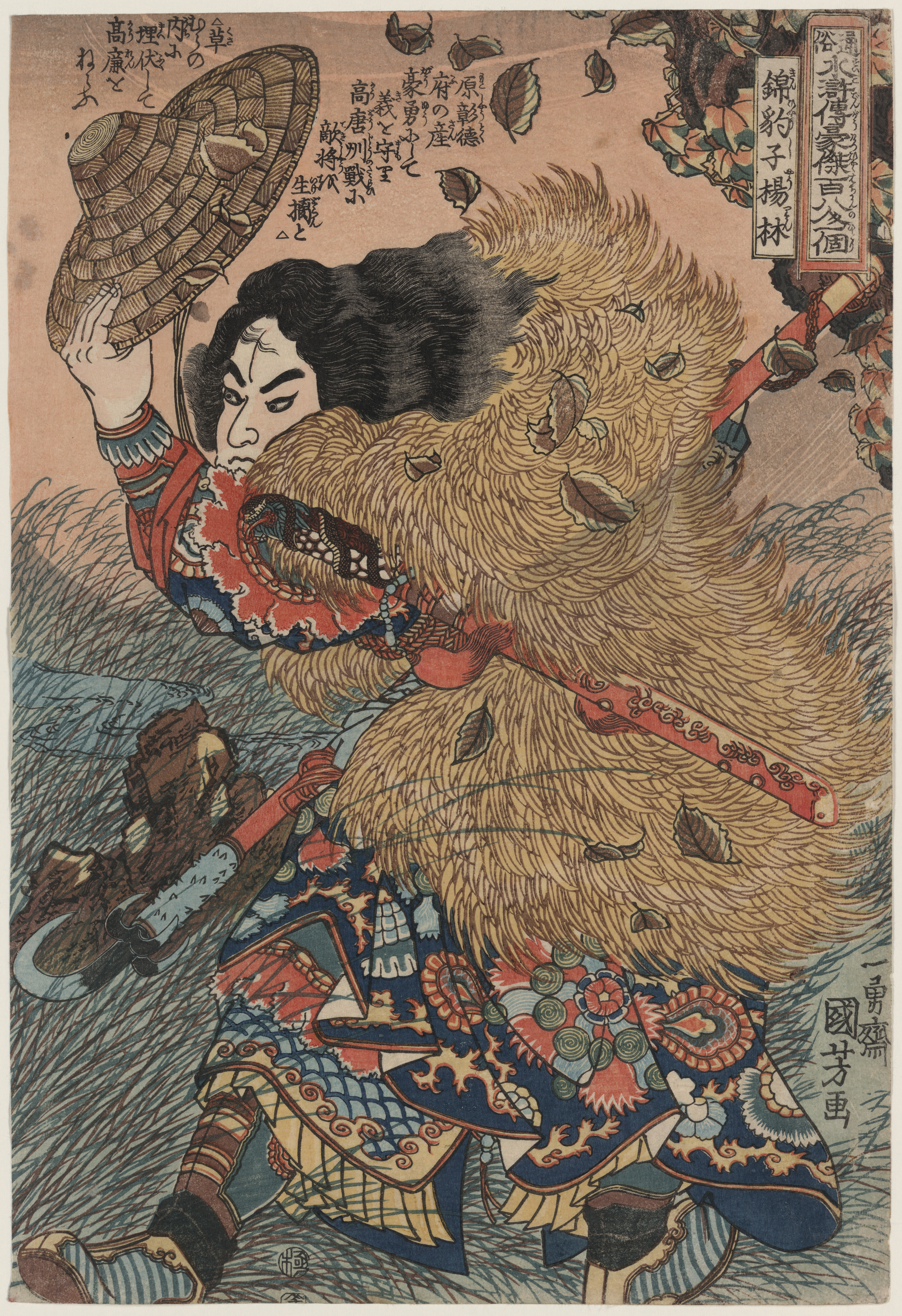
- an illustration of Yang Lin by Utagawa Kuniyoshi
- First appearance: Chapter 44

In-universe information
- Nickname: "Multicoloured Leopard" 錦豹子
- Weapon: iron spear
- Origin: outlaw
- Designation: Tiger Cub Patrol Commander of Liangshan
- Rank: 51st, Dark Star (地暗星) of the 72 Earthly Fiends
- Ancestral home / Place of origin: Zhangde Prefecture (present-day Anyang, Henan)

Chinese names
- Simplified Chinese: 杨林
- Traditional Chinese: 楊林
- Pinyin: Yáng Lín
- Wade–Giles: Yang Lin

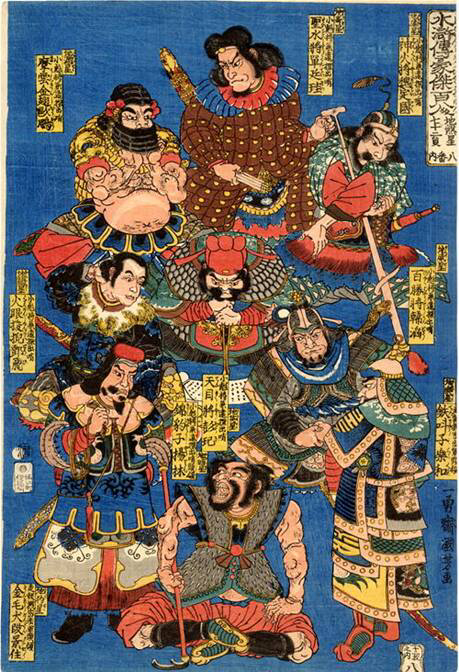
An illustration of nine of the 108 Heroes by Utagawa Kuniyoshi. Peng Qi is in the centre. The rest are (clockwise from top): Shan Tinggui, Wei Dingguo, Han Tao, Yue He, Yang Lin, Duan Jingzhu, Deng Fei, and Ou Peng.

Yang Lin is a fictional character in Water Margin, one of the Classic Chinese Novels. Nicknamed "Multicoloured Leopard", he ranks 51st among the 108 Heroes and 15th among the 72 Earthly Fiends.

== Background ==
Originally from Zhangde Prefecture (彰德府; present-day Anyang, Henan), Yang Lin is described in the novel as a man with a round head, large and beautiful eyes, a straight nose, a squarish mouth, a narrow waist, and broad shoulders. A highly-skilled fighter who specialises in using an iron spear, he is nicknamed "Multicoloured Leopard".

== Meeting Dai Zong ==
Yang Lin is first introduced in the novel as a wandering outlaw. By chance, he encounters Dai Zong, an outlaw from Liangshan Marsh, who has been sent to Jizhou (薊州; present-day Jizhou, Tianjin) to fetch Gongsun Sheng. Although he has never met Dai Zong before, he deduces Dai's identity from his speedy pace, and calls out to Dai by his nickname, "Magic Traveller". Dai Zong, surprised that a stranger recognises him, stops and greets him. After Yang Lin introduces himself, Dai Zong invites him to join the outlaw band at Liangshan Marsh and takes him along to find Gongsun Sheng.

Along the way, Yang Lin and Dai Zong pass by Yinma River (飲馬川; in present-day Jizhou, Tianjin) and encounter an outlaw band led by Pei Xuan, Deng Fei and Meng Kang. It turns out that Yang Lin and Deng Fei are old acquaintances. At Dai Zong's invitation, the Yinma River outlaws also join the Liangshan outlaw band.

== Battle against the Zhu Family Village ==
Yang Lin appears again in the novel when the Liangshan outlaws are attacking the Zhu Family Village, a fortified village run by the three Zhu brothers and their father, who are hostile towards the outlaws.

Yang Lin, volunteering to scout the terrain and gather intelligence, disguises himself as a Taoist priest and infiltrates the village. However, he is discovered by the enemy and taken captive. He is freed only after the outlaws defeat the Zhus and overrun the village.

== Campaigns ==
Yang Lin is appointed as a Tiger Cub Patrol Commander of the Liangshan's cavalry after the 108 Heroes are fully assembled. He participates in the campaigns against the Liao invaders and rebel forces in Song territory after the outlaws receive amnesty from Emperor Huizong.

During the campaign against Fang La's rebel forces, Yang Lin joins Mu Hong in successfully carrying out an espionage mission in Runzhou (潤州; present-day Runzhou District, Zhenjiang, Jiangsu). After the Liangshan forces capture Hangzhou, Yang Lin falls sick and has to remain in the city to recuperate, hence he is not involved in the final battle.

Yang Lin is one of the few Liangshan heroes who survive all the campaigns. Although the emperor offers him an official appointment to honour him for his contributions during the campaigns, he declines and chooses to return to Yinma River with Pei Xuan to lead a peaceful life.
