= Ninetails =

Ninetails may refer to:

- Cat o' nine tails, a type of multi-tailed whip
- Nine-tailed fox, a mythical fox entity originating from Chinese mythology
- Nine-tailed turtle, a legendary Chinese turtle
- Typha latifolia, a perennial herbaceous plant commonly called "cat-o'-nine-tails"
- Ninetails, a fictional character in the video game Ōkami

== See also ==
- Ninetales, a Pokémon species
