= Tian Hu =

Fictional character in Water Margin

- Water Margin character
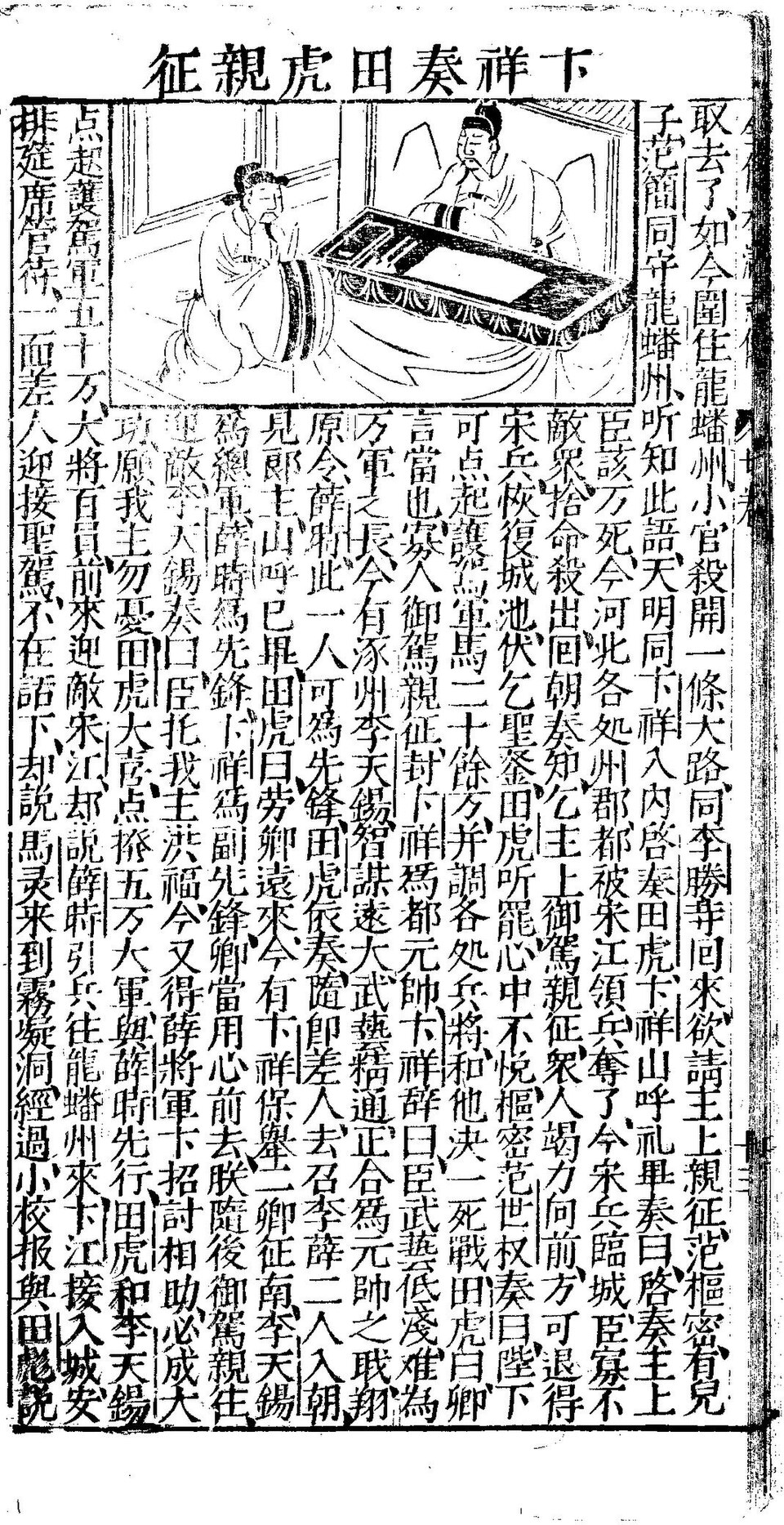
- Bian Xiang presents a memorial to Tian Hu, from the Ming Dynasty Liu Xingwo edition of the Water Margin
- First appearance: Chapter 91

In-universe information
- Alias: King of Jin (晉王)
- Origin: Hunter
- Designation: Leader of Tian Hu forces
- Ancestral home / Place of origin: Qinyuan County, Shanxi

Chinese names
- Simplified Chinese: 田虎
- Traditional Chinese: 田虎
- Pinyin: Tián Hǔ
- Wade–Giles: Tien Hu

Tian Hu is a fictional character and antagonist in Water Margin, one of the Four Great Classical Novels of Chinese literature. He is one of the three rebel leaders in the Song dynasty along with Fang La and Wang Qing, that the Liangshan heroes have to defeat in the final chapters of the novel. He only appears in the longest versions of the stories which include these extra chapters.

== Life ==
Tian Hu was originally a hunter from Qinyuan County, Weisheng Prefecture (威胜府), Shanxi. He possesses great physical strength and excels in martial arts. The government of the Song dynasty is corrupt and people are suffering from extreme poverty and natural disasters. Tian Hu uses the opportunity to spread rumours and incite people to follow him in rebelling against the government.

As the local government is weak and lacks a capable military force to suppress Tian Hu's rebels, Tian conquers and overrun five prefectures and 56 counties in a short time. Tian Hu establishes for himself a domain in the Hebei and Shanxi region and proclaims himself "King of Jin". He also builds a palace for himself in Fenyang.

After the Liangshan outlaws have been granted amnesty by Emperor Huizong, the emperor sends them on military campaigns to drive away the Liao invaders in the north and suppress the rebel forces on Song territory as a form of service to the Song Empire. The Liangshan heroes defeated the Liao invaders, followed by Tian Hu and Wang Qing's rebel forces, without suffering much casualties. Tian Hu is captured by Liangshan's "Featherless Arrow" Zhang Qing after his defeat.
