= Jiao Ting =

Fictional character in the Chinese classical novel Water Margin

- Water Margin character
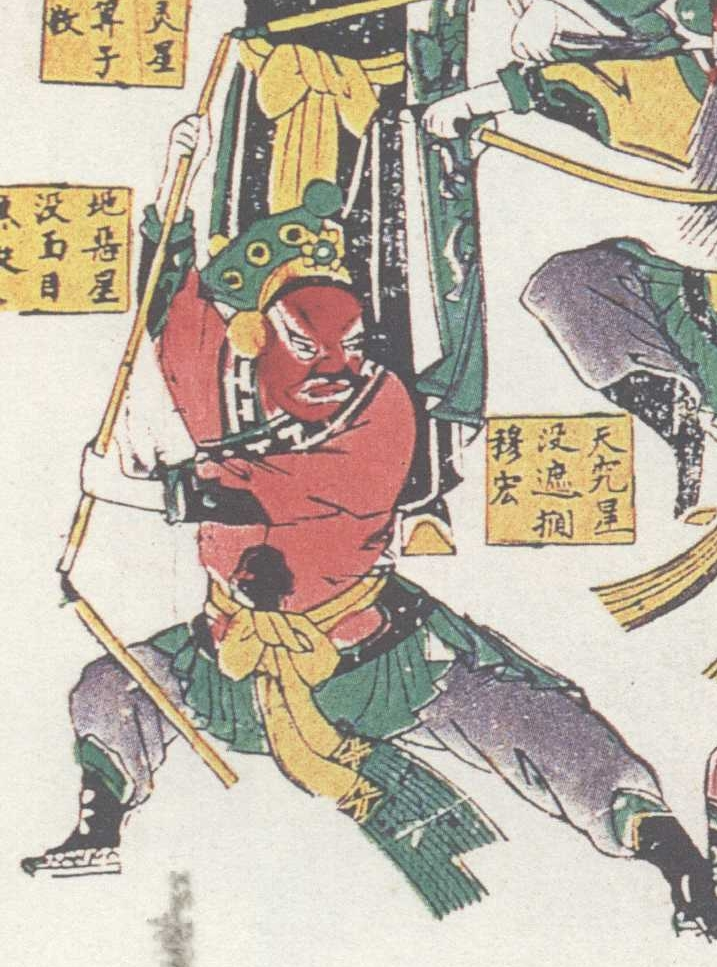
- a Qing dynasty illustration of Jiao Ting
- First appearance: Chapter 67

In-universe information
- Nickname: "Faceless" 沒面目
- Origin: wrestler
- Designation: Infantry Commander of Liangshan
- Rank: 98th, Evil Star (地惡星) of the 72 Earthly Fiends
- Ancestral home / Place of origin: Zhongshan Prefecture (around present-day Dingzhou, Hebei)

Chinese names
- Simplified Chinese: 焦挺
- Traditional Chinese: 焦挺
- Pinyin: Jiāo Tǐng
- Wade–Giles: Chiao T'ing

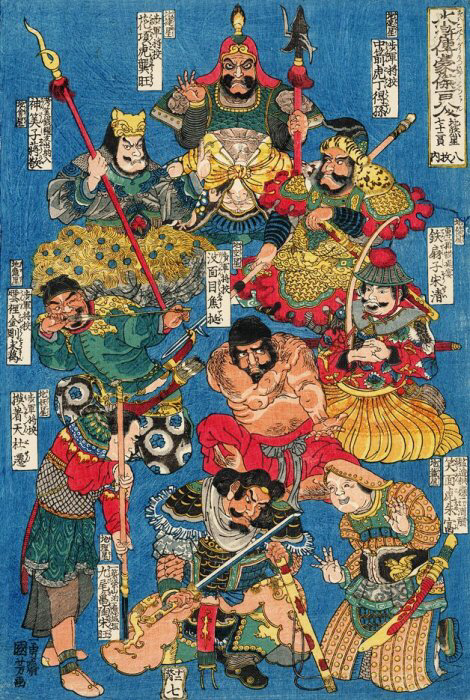
An illustration of nine of the 108 Heroes by Utagawa Kuniyoshi. Clockwise from top: Gong Wang, Ding Desun, Song Qing, Jiao Ting, Zhu Fu, Tao Zongwang, Du Qian, Song Wan, and Jiang Jing.

Jiao Ting is a fictional character in Water Margin, one of the Classic Chinese Novels. Nicknamed "Faceless", he ranks 98th among the 108 Heroes and 62nd among the 72 Earthly Fiends.

== Background ==
Originally from Zhongshan Prefecture (中山府; around present-day Dingzhou, Hebei), Jiao Ting is a highly-skilled fighter who specialises in wrestling, having mastered a set of wrestling techniques which cannot be taught to anyone outside his family. He roams from place to place and is nicknamed "Faceless" as he prefers to remain anonymous in the jianghu despite his skill.

== Encounter with Li Kui ==
Jiao Ting intends to join the outlaws led by Bao Xu at Deadwood Hill (枯樹山) in Kouzhou (寇州; present-day Guan County, Shandong). On the way there, he encounters Li Kui, an outlaw from Liangshan Marsh, and keeps staring at him, completely unfazed by Li's bravado and beastly appearance. Annoyed, Li Kui fights with Jiao Ting, but ends up losing.

Impressed with Jiao Ting's skill, Li Kui introduces himself and invites Jiao to join the outlaw band at Liangshan. Jiao Ting eagerly accepts and travels with Li Kui to Deadwood Hill to find Bao Xu. It turns out that Li Kui has left Liangshan without authorisation to join his fellow outlaws in attacking the government forces sent to destroy Liangshan.

== Becoming an outlaw ==
Upon reaching Deadwood Hill, Li Kui and Jiao Ting introduce themselves to Bao Xu, who accepts Li's invitation to join Liangshan as well. Just then, the trio learn that Liangshan's Xuan Zan and Hao Siwen have been captured by government forces, and that the convoy escorting the two captives is passing by Deadwood Hill. Together, they attack the convoy and save Xuan Zan and Hao Siwen.

Afterwards, Jiao Ting joins Li Kui, Bao Xu and the Deadwood Hill outlaws in launching a surprise attack on the government forces' base at Lingzhou (凌州; in present-day Dezhou, Shandong). Following the outlaws' victory, Jiao Ting follows Li Kui and the others back to Liangshan, and becomes a member of the Liangshan outlaw band.

== Campaigns and death ==
Jiao Ting is appointed as a commander of the Liangshan infantry after the 108 Heroes are fully assembled. He participates in the campaigns against the Liao invaders and rebel forces in Song territory after the outlaws receive amnesty from Emperor Huizong.

During the final campaign against Fang La's rebel forces, Jiao Ting is killed at the battle of Runzhou (潤州; present-day Runzhou District, Zhenjiang, Jiangsu).
