= Chen Shuozhen =

Chinese peasant woman and rebel leader who declared herself Empress Regnant

Empress Wenjia 文佳皇帝

Empress regnant of China
- Reign: September – November 653
- Predecessor: Emperor Gaozong (as Emperor of the Tang dynasty)
- Successor: Emperor Gaozong (as Emperor of the Tang dynasty); Wu Zetian (as Empress regnant of the Zhou Dynasty)
- Prime Minister: Zhang Shuzeng
- Born: 7th-century
- Died: November 653
Names
- Family name: Chen (陳); Given name: Shuozhen (碩真)
Regnal name
- Empress Wenjia (文佳皇帝)
- Occupation: Rebel leader

Chen Shuozhen (Chinese: 陳碩真; pinyin: Chén Shuòzhēn; died November 653) was a Tang dynasty woman from Muzhou (in modern Chun'an, Zhejiang), who led a peasant uprising in 653. During the rebellion, she declared herself Empress Wenjia (文佳皇帝), becoming the first female rebel leader in Chinese history to assume the title of Huangdi ("emperor"). Shuozhen rang bells and burnt incense as she marched to war. She was said to have magic powers, and her people said she was a deity.

== Biography ==
Chen Shuozhen's family and background are not entirely known, though her skill with warfare suggests she may have come from a family with martial experience. She may have come from a humble background, as she is sometimes referred to as a peasant.

In the early years of Tang Gaozong, the Zhejiang area went through successive periods of famine. The peasants were living in precarious conditions, due to hunger and also the oppression of the nobles. Because of this, there was an increasing discontent with the feudal lords and the Empire. This may have inspired Chen Shuozen to rebel, and may have encouraged people to join her.

In 653 AD, less than four years after the death of Emperor Taizong, a large-scale peasant uprising occurred in Zhejiang during the fourth year of Tang Gaozong's Yonghui era. Chen Shuozhen was the leader of this rebellion, she claimed to return to the world from heaven. She gathered a large number of believers with enchanting people. In early 653, she started her own army and claimed to be "Huangdi Wenjia"; and appointed her brother-in-law (Zhang Shuzeng) as her prime minister.

Chen Shuozhen led two thousand people to capture Chenzhou and Yuqian County, she also attacked Zhangzhou but failed. After several battles the whole army was wiped out. She was also killed in November of that year, and tens of thousands of people surrendered.

Chen Shuozhen's reign lasted only two months, with the last of her 14,000 troops surrendering in late 653. Her story survives though as she's said to have inspired Fang La's uprising at the end of the Northern Song dynasty and remains prominent in Zhejiang folklore.

Historian Jian Bozan (翦伯赞) recognized Chen Shuozhen as the first empress-regnant in Chinese history.
