= Nine-tailed turtle =

Legendary Chinese turtle

- Traditional Chinese: 九尾龜
- Simplified Chinese: 九尾龟
Transcriptions
Standard Mandarin
- Hanyu Pinyin: Jiǔ Wěi Guī
- Wade–Giles: Chiu3 Wei3 Kuei1

The Nine-tailed turtle (traditional Chinese: 九尾龜; simplified Chinese: 九尾龟) is a legendary Chinese turtle.

== Possible origin ==
In an appended supplement to Records of the Grand Historian, the Han dynasty scholar Chu Shaosun (104?–30 BC) mentioned eight famous turtles particularly suitable for plastromancy or turtle shell divination, one being called the "Turtle of Nine Provinces" (九州龜). Famous turtles supposedly had written signs below their plastrons, and those who could find such a turtle would be richly rewarded, "up to ten million." Over time "Turtle of Nine Provinces" became "Turtle of Nine Tails" in folklore. According to one source, it takes a turtle three thousand years to grow another tail.

== Alleged sightings ==
Two extant stories from imperial China both appear to advocate for the life release of nine-tailed turtles.

According to a story compiled by Hong Mai (1123–1202) in his Yijian Zhi, during the Jin–Song Wars of 1126, when the Song "southern capital" Yingtian Prefecture (modern Shangqiu) was under siege, a huge nine-tailed turtle appeared in the city. It was described as being three chi tall, "as big as a wheel", with nine bony tails and a yellow, waxy carapace. On every scute was etched a Chinese character; but only eight were legible, which together said: "Guo Fu's life release [deserves] ten thousand years". The city's defender, Zhu Lugong (朱魯公), had it placed inside a temple for the City God, and residents flocked to the temple to see it. Zhu, worried about its potential effect on the populace, announced that the turtle must return to water as it was not eating. The turtle was thrown into the South Lake (南湖), never to be seen again, and the city held out for more than six months from Jin invaders.

The Ming dynasty writer Lu Can (1494–1551) included a zhiguai story about a nine-tailed turtle in his Gengsi Bian (庚巳編). The story, he claimed, came from someone named Qiu Ningke (仇寧客) who "personally witnessed it". One day, in the city of Haining, a Butcher surnamed Wang (王) and his son bought a large turtle from the fish market. After they returned home, a merchant arrived from south of the Qiantang River, offering them a large sum for the turtle which he intended to release back into the river. When asked why, he pressed down on the turtle shell and revealed four smaller tails on each side of the large tail. Butcher Wang and his son ignored him and proceeded to slaughter the turtle for their dinner. That night, the river flooded and beds floated, but the water quickly subsided. The next day, their landlord wondered why they were not up, receiving no response, finally broke through their door. Their clothes were still on the bed but the Wangs were missing.

== Symbolism ==
As a nickname, "Nine-Tailed Turtle" can be either positive or negative. Tao Zongwang, a hero from the Ming classical novel Water Margin, is nicknamed "Nine-Tailed Turtle". On the other hand, the Qing dynasty novel The Nine-Tailed Turtle (serialized 1906–1910), about prostitution, derived its title from a scandal in the household of Kang Jisheng, a former Jiangxi governor. The novel explains that "turtle" is a derisive word for a husband with an unfaithful wife. In the case of Kang Jisheng, all nine women in his household are loose, so he has the nickname "Nine-Tailed Turtle".

== See also ==
- Nine-tailed fox
