= Lin Chong =

Fictional character in the Chinese classical novel Water Margin

- Water Margin character
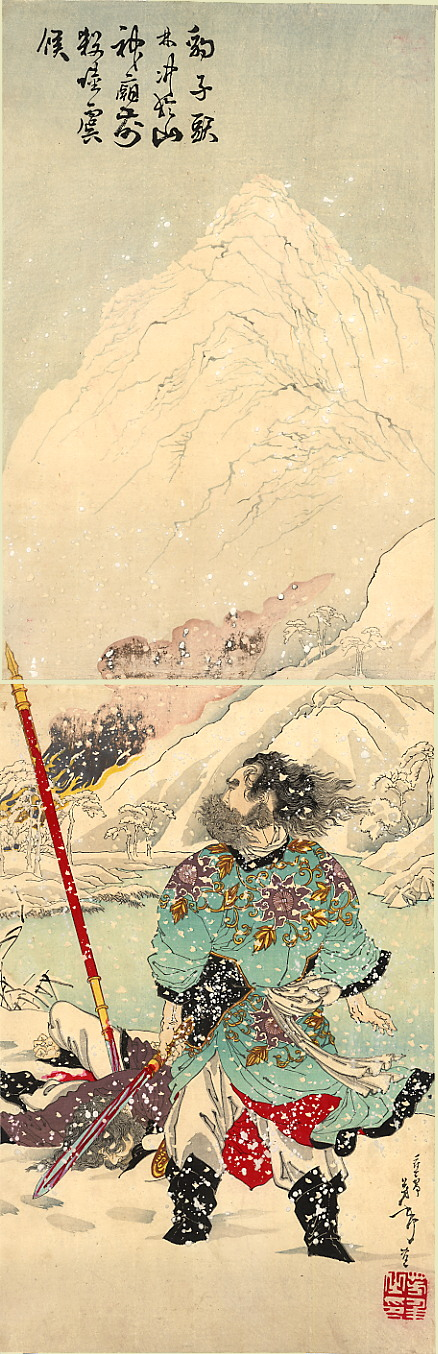
- an illustration of Lin Chong by Tsukioka Yoshitoshi
- First appearance: Chapter 7

In-universe information
- Aliases: "Instructor Lin" 林教頭; "Little Zhang Fei" 小張飛
- Nicknames: "Panther Head" 豹子頭
- Weapon: serpent spear / podao
- Origin: martial arts instructor
- Designation: Right General of the Five Tiger Generals of Liangshan
- Rank: 6th, Majestic Star (天雄星) of the 36 Heavenly Spirits
- Ancestral home / Place of origin: Dongjing (present-day Kaifeng, Henan)

Chinese names
- Simplified Chinese: 林冲
- Traditional Chinese: 林冲
- Pinyin: Lín Chōng
- Wade–Giles: Lin Ch'ung

Lin Chong is a fictional character in Water Margin, one of the Classic Chinese Novels. Nicknamed "Panther Head", he ranks sixth among the 108 Heroes. In some folktales derived from the novel, he is said to have learnt martial arts from Zhou Tong, who purportedly trained the Song dynasty general Yue Fei in archery.

== Background ==
Lin Chong is first mentioned in the novel as the martial arts instructor of the 800,000-strong imperial guards in Dongjing (東京; present-day Kaifeng, Henan), the capital of the Song dynasty. Described as resembling Zhang Fei in his appearance, he stands at a height of over six chi, with piercing eyes and a head like a panther's, hence he is nicknamed "Panther Head".

== Framed and exiled ==
Lin Chong first meets Lu Zhishen when he is deeply impressed after observing the latter practising drills with his monk's staff in the garden of the Daxiangguo Temple. They chat and become sworn brothers. During this time, Gao Yanei, the foster son of the corrupt Grand Marshal Gao Qiu, attempts to molest Lin Chong's wife after chancing upon her. Lin Chong rushes to save his wife after being alerted by their servant, but refrains from pressing charges after learning who Gao Yanei is. However, Gao Yanei is obsessed with Lin Chong's wife so he seeks help from Lu Qian, Lin Chong's old friend who now works for Gao Qiu. Lu Qian tricks Lin Chong's wife into visiting his residence, where Gao Yanei is waiting. Lin Chong, informed of the incident by a servant, rushes to Lu Qian's residence, saves his wife, and destroys everything in the house to vent his frustration.

Gao Yanei is still unwilling to give up on Lin Chong's wife so he devises a plan with his foster father and Lu Qian to get rid of Lin Chong. Knowing that Lin Chong appreciates fine weapons, Gao Qiu sends a man to pretend to sell him a precious sabre on the street, and then summons Lin Chong to meet him under the pretence of wanting to see his newly purchased weapon. Lin Chong, carrying the sabre, unsuspectingly enters a meeting hall in Gao Qiu's office where weapons are prohibited. He is then arrested for allegedly attempting to assassinate the Grand Marshal.

During Lin Chong's trial, Gao Qiu tries to pressure the judge into sentencing Lin Chong to death. However, the judge sentences Lin Chong to face-tattooing and exile in Cangzhou instead. Before leaving Dongjing, Lin Chong reluctantly divorces his wife to give her a chance to remarry. Meanwhile, Gao Qiu bribes Dong Chao and Xue Ba – the guards escorting Lin Chong to Cangzhou – to kill him along the way. Throughout the journey, the guards mistreat Lin Chong, including scalding his feet at one point. In Wild Boar Forest, they are about to murder Lin Chong when Lu Zhishen suddenly shows up and knocks them down. Lu Zhishen wants to kill the guards, but Lin Chong stops him and insists on serving his sentence. Lu Zhishen then accompanies Lin Chong to Cangzhou to ensure that the guards do not try to hurt him.

In Cangzhou, Lin Chong befriends the nobleman Chai Jin and earns his admiration after defeating an arrogant martial arts instructor living off Chai Jin's generosity. Chai Jin also gives Lin Chong money to bribe the jailers in Cangzhou so that Lin will have an easier life in prison.

== Burning of the fodder depot ==
Learning that Lin Chong has survived his journey, Gao Qiu sends Lu Qian and his steward Fu'an to Cangzhou on a second attempt to murder Lin. Lu Qian bribes the prison warden to assign Lin Chong to be a solo watchman at a fodder depot. On the day Lin Chong takes up his new assignment, Lu Qian, Fu'an and the warden set fire to the depot after nightfall, hoping that Lin will die in the blaze.

However, Lin Chong survives as he has taken shelter in a nearby rundown temple as his hut in the depot has collapsed under heavy snowfall. Upon seeing the depot on fire, he intends to rush back to put out the flames but sees the three men approaching the temple and overhears their conversation. Enraged, he charges out, kills them after a fight, and offers their heads to the deity in the temple. He then abandons the burning depot and flees.

== Becoming an outlaw ==
While on the run, Lin Chong meets Chai Jin again, who suggests he joins the outlaws at Liangshan Marsh and writes a recommendation letter to Wang Lun, the chief of the outlaw band. When Lin Chong finally arrives at Liangshan, Wang Lun tries to send him away with excuses and gifts as he secretly fears that Lin Chong, given his superior fighting skills, might usurp his position as chief. After Lin Chong pleads with Wang Lun to let him stay in Liangshan, Wang reluctantly agrees on the condition that Lin kills a man within three days and presents his head.

On the third day, Lin Chong encounters and fights Yang Zhi. Both men are equally matched so they reach a stalemate. Wang Lun shows up, stops them, and invites Yang Zhi to join the outlaw band, hoping that Yang Zhi will serve as a counterweight to Lin Chong. After Yang Zhi declines and leaves, Wang Lun grudgingly allows Lin Chong to remain in Liangshan and take the fourth leadership position after himself and his lieutenants Du Qian and Song Wan.

When Chao Gai and six others come to Liangshan to take refuge after robbing a convoy of birthday gifts for a corrupt official, Wang Lun feels threatened by their presence and tries to send them away in the same way he did to Lin Chong. Feeling indignant and already holding a grudge against Wang Lun for treating him with contempt, Lin Chong ultimately kills Wang after being instigated by Wu Yong, one of the seven. When offered to replace Wang Lun as Liangshan's chief, Lin Chong declines and instead nominates Chao Gai to be the new leader. Lin Chong then remains in the fourth position of leadership after Chao Gai, Wu Yong and Gongsun Sheng.

== Life in Liangshan ==
Lin Chong is appointed as one of the Five Tiger Generals of the Liangshan cavalry after the 108 Heroes are fully assembled.

When Gao Qiu personally leads government forces to attack the outlaws at Liangshan Marsh, he ends up being defeated and captured. The 120-chapter edition of the novel mentions that Lin Chong glares at Gao Qiu as he is being escorted into Liangshan's main hall as a captive. Song Jiang, Liangshan's chief, treats Gao Qiu respectfully and eventually releases him to avoid antagonising the government so as to increase the outlaws' chances of receiving amnesty from Emperor Huizong.

== Death ==
Song Jiang's dream comes true when Emperor Huizong grants the outlaws amnesty and sends them on campaigns against Liao invaders and rebel forces within Song territory. Lin Chong participates in the campaigns and distinguishes himself in battle by defeating enemy warriors. Just when the campaigns are over, Lin Chong is suddenly stricken with paralysis. He dies six months later under Wu Song's care at Liuhe Pagoda in Hangzhou, where his sworn brother Lu Zhishen had died half a year earlier.

== Cultural references ==
In Beijing opera, there are two plays about how Lin Chong becomes an outlaw. The first, "Wild Boar Forest" (野猪林), follows the story of Lu Zhishen saving Lin Chong's life during his journey to Cangzhou. The second, "Lin Chong Flees by Night" (林冲夜奔), follows the story of the fodder depot being set on fire and Lin Chong's journey to Liangshan Marsh.

In the 1973 Japanese television series The Water Margin, Lin Chong (spelt "Lin Chung"), portrayed by Atsuo Nakamura, is the lead character and the unofficial leader of the Liangshan outlaws.

In the 2022 cyber thriller novel Rise of the Water Margin by Christopher Bates which reimagines Water Margin in a 21st-century setting, Lin Chong is the protagonist and commander of Unit 61398 who is framed for treason and manslaughter and forced to go on the run. He takes refuge at Liangshan Marsh, a hacker enclave in one of China's deserted "ghost cities". Devastated by his wife's suicide, he unleashes a cyber-weapon that threatens to draw China and the United States into a nuclear war.

== See also ==
- Minor characters in Lin Chong's story for a list of supporting minor characters from Lin Chong's story.
