= Yang Zhi (Water Margin) =

Fictional character in the Chinese classical novel Water Margin

- Water Margin character
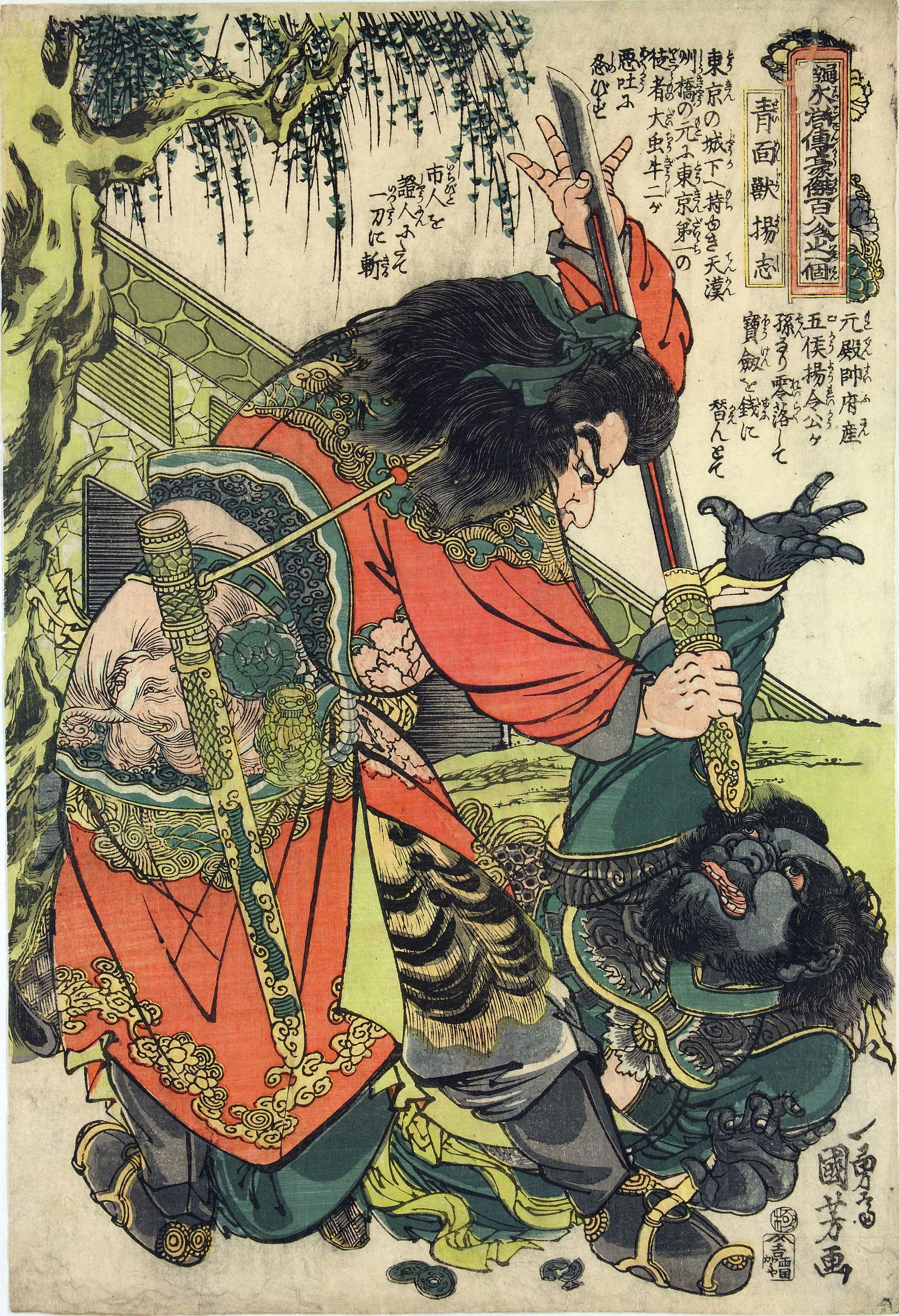
- an illustration of Yang Zhi by Utagawa Kuniyoshi
- First appearance: Chapter 12

In-universe information
- Nicknames: "Blue-faced Beast" 青面獸
- Weapon: sabre, spear
- Origin: military officer
- Designation: Tiger Cub Vanguard Commander of Liangshan
- Rank: 17th, Dark Star (天暗星) of the 36 Heavenly Spirits
- Ancestral home / Place of origin: Taiyuan, Shanxi

Chinese names
- Simplified Chinese: 杨志
- Traditional Chinese: 楊志
- Pinyin: Yáng Zhì
- Wade–Giles: Yang Chih

Yang Zhi is a fictional character in Water Margin, one of the Classic Chinese Novels. Nicknamed "Blue-faced Beast", he ranks 17th among the 36 Heavenly Spirits, the first third of the 108 Heroes.

== Historical basis ==
According to the 13th-century text The Compilation of the Northern Alliance in Three Reigns (三朝北盟會編) by Xu Mengshen, the historical figure Song Jiang, who had led a rebellion against the Song dynasty in the early 12th century, had 36 followers. One of them, Yang Zhi, had surrendered along with Song Jiang and the others to the Song government. In 1126, Yang Zhi accompanied the Song general Chong Shizhong (种師中) to fight in the Jin–Song wars, but abandoned his position during battle, resulting in Chong's defeat and death.

== Background ==
Yang Zhi is a descendant of Yang Ye, the patriarch of the Yang family in the Generals of the Yang Family collection of stories. He is described in the novel as a seven chi-tall man with red hairs on his chin, and a dark blue birthmark on his face which earns him the nickname "Blue-faced Beast". A highly-skilled martial artist and archer, he uses either a sabre or spear in combat.

Yang Zhi was originally a military officer serving under Grand Marshal Gao Qiu in the capital Dongjing (東京; present-day Kaifeng, Henan). He had been tasked with escorting a huashigang (花石綱) – a convoy of rare minerals and plants – to Dongjing for decorating a park in the palace. However, he failed his mission when the items were lost in the Yellow River during a storm. Fearing punishment, he had been on the run until Emperor Huizong granted a general amnesty for a wide range of non-capital offences. Yang Zhi then returns to Dongjing in the hope of getting back his job.

== Encounter with Lin Chong ==
En route, Yang Zhi passes by Liangshan Marsh, where he encounters Lin Chong, who intends to kill him and present his head to the outlaw chief Wang Lun as his ticket to join the outlaw band. After a long one-on-one fight, neither Yang Zhi nor Lin Chong manages to overcome his opponent, and they are impressed with each other's fighting prowess. Wang Lun shows up, stops the fight, and invites Yang Zhi to join the outlaws, hoping to use Yang Zhi as a counterweight against Lin Chong, whom he fears might usurp his position as chief. However, Yang Zhi declines as he does not want to tarnish his ancestor's reputation by becoming an outlaw.

== Selling his precious sabre ==
A Qing dynasty illustration of Yang Zhi

Upon returning to Dongjing, Yang Zhi bribes various officials to help him put in a good word to Gao Qiu in the hopes of being reinstated as a military officer. When Yang Zhi finally gets to meet Gao Qiu in person to make his plea, the Grand Marshal furiously admonishes him for his failure and throws him out.

Having spent all his money on the bribes, Yang Zhi has no choice but to take his family heirloom, a precious sabre, to sell at a busy marketplace. He encounters the hooligan Niu Er, who harasses him and makes him demonstrate the weapon's qualities. Yang Zhi uses the sabre to slice a stack of coins in half, and shows that its blade can cut a fine strand of hair blown against it. Niu Er then demands that Yang Zhi prove that the blade is resistant to bloodstains by killing somebody with it. When Yang Zhi refuses and walks away, Niu Er attempts to snatch the sabre from him, and Yang accidentally kills him in the ensuing scuffle.

Yang Zhi goes to the yamen to surrender himself. As Niu Er had been a public nuisance, the locals plead with the judge to show leniency to Yang Zhi, who is spared the death penalty and sentenced to face-tattooing and exiled to Daming Prefecture (大名府; present-day Daming County, Hebei).

== Escorting the convoy of birthday gifts ==
In Daming Prefecture, Yang Zhi attracts the attention of the governor, Grand Secretary Liang Shijie, who has heard of his background and wants to recruit him. Liang Shijie tests Yang Zhi's skill by arranging for him to duel Zhou Jin, one of Liang's best warriors. After Yang beats Zhou easily, Suo Chao, another of Liang's warriors, steps up to challenge Yang. Both men duel but neither manages to defeat his opponent. Liang is so impressed with both men that he promotes them to the same position.

Later, Liang Shijie prepares a convoy of valuables to be sent as birthday gifts to his father-in-law Cai Jing in Dongjing. After he picks Yang Zhi to lead the convoy, the latter requests that they keep the group small and disguise themselves as traders to avoid attracting robbers' attention. Liang agrees and puts Yang completely in charge of the mission.

Reminded of his past failure and seeking to avoid repeating it, Yang Zhi treats his men harshly during the journey, beating them with twigs when they dawdle and pushing them to cover great distances under the blazing sun. When they arrive at Yellow Soil Ridge (黃泥崗) near Yuncheng County, they take a break under the shade and encounter a group of seven jujube traders, and a merchant selling two buckets of an alcoholic drink. Yang Zhi's men request to buy the drink to quench their thirst but Yang refuses, fearing that it might be spiked with menghanyao (蒙汗藥), a drug that induces unconsciousness. However, he relents after seeing that the jujube traders are fine after drinking from one bucket. Yang Zhi and his men drink from the second bucket, and soon they feel dizzy and start losing consciousness. It turns out that the seven traders are Chao Gai and his friends in disguise, and they have plotted with the merchant Bai Sheng to fool Yang Zhi and his men into consuming the menghanyao-spiked drink so that they can rob the convoy.

== Becoming an outlaw ==
Yang Zhi, having drunk the least, is the first to regain consciousness. Feeling despair over failing his mission, he abandons his men and goes on the run again. As Yang Zhi has been unkind to them earlier, the men return to Daming Prefecture and accuse Yang Zhi of being the robbers' accomplice. A furious Liang Shijie orders Yang Zhi's arrest and pressures the local authorities to hunt down the robbers.

Meanwhile, Yang Zhi takes a break in a tavern run by Cao Zheng, a former martial arts apprentice of Lin Chong, and tries to leave after his meal without paying, resulting in a fight between the two men. Noticing Yang Zhi's skill, Cao Zheng stops, asks for his name, and hears of his misfortune. He then recommends Yang Zhi to join the outlaw band led by Deng Long at Mount Twin Dragons (二龍山). While travelling there together, they meet Lu Zhishen, who has just had a run-in with the outlaws. Yang Zhi and Cao Zheng then pretend to have drugged and captured Lu Zhishen, and are escorting him as a captive to the stronghold to claim their reward. Deng Long falls for the ruse and lets them in, after which they kill him and take over the stronghold. Yang Zhi serves as the outlaw band's second-in-command after Lu Zhishen.

The outlaws at Mount Twin Dragons, including Yang Zhi, eventually join the larger outlaw band at Liangshan Marsh after the battle of Qingzhou between government forces and the Liangshan outlaws.

== Death ==
Yang Zhi is appointed as one of the eight Tiger Cub Vanguard Commanders of the Liangshan cavalry after the 108 Heroes are fully assembled. He participates in the campaigns against the Liao invaders and rebel forces in Song territory after the outlaws receive amnesty from Emperor Huizong.

Yang Zhi dies of illness during the final campaign against Fang La's rebel forces shortly after the battle of Dantu County (丹徒縣; in present-day Zhenjiang, Jiangsu). To honour him for his contributions during the campaigns, the emperor awards him the posthumous title "Martial Gentleman of Loyalty" (忠武郎).

== See also ==
- List of Water Margin minor characters#Yang Zhi's story for a list of supporting minor characters from Yang Zhi's story.
