= She Prefecture =

Former administrative division in Anhui, China

Shezhou or She Prefecture (歙州) was a zhou (prefecture) in imperial China centering on modern She County, Anhui, China. It existed (intermittently) between 589 and 1121, the latter being the year the Song dynasty ended the major rebellion led by Fang La in Shezhou.
