= Fang La =

Chinese anti-Song rebel leader (died 1121)

Fang La 方臘
- Born: Unknown; She County, Anhui
- Died: 1121; Kaifeng, Henan
- Occupation: Rebel leader

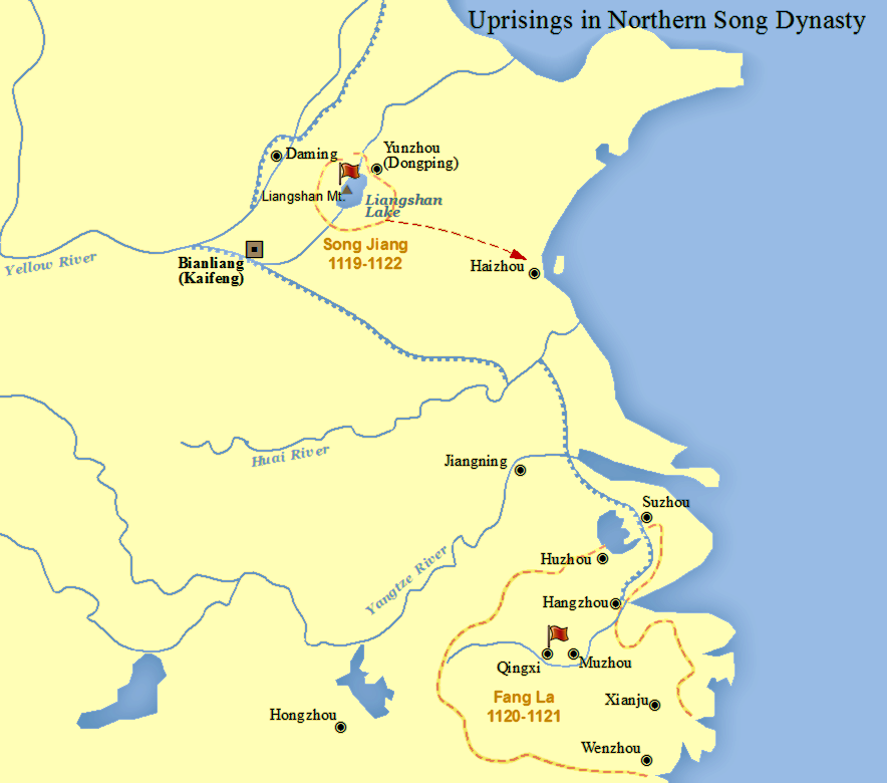
Map showing Fang La's rebellion.

Fang La (simplified Chinese: 方腊; traditional Chinese: 方臘; pinyin: Fāng Là; died 1121) was a Chinese rebel leader who led an uprising against the Song dynasty. In the classical novel Water Margin, he is fictionalised as one of the primary antagonists and nemeses of the 108 Stars of Destiny. He is sometimes associated with Manichaeism but was most likely not a follower of the religion.

== Life ==
Fang La was from Shezhou, which is roughly present-day She County, Anhui. However, other sources claimed that he was from Qingxi County (清溪縣), which is present-day Chun'an County, Zhejiang. In 1975, Anhui Normal University's History Department of Fang La Investigation Team published "On Fang La's Origin and Early Revolutionary Activities" in the Journal of Anhui Normal University (Humanities and Social Sciences). Based on multiple Fang clan genealogies—such as those of Liushan Zhenying Temple (Qianlong 17), Guilin (Jiaqing 17), Tuoyuan (Qianlong 3 and 10), Henan, Shanguo Production Team, Laozhuyuan, and Sizili—they concluded Fang La hailed from Tuoyuan, She County (now Maling in Yongfeng Township).

Fang was a well-to-do owner of a plantation of lacquer trees. In 1120, he led an uprising against the Song Empire in Qixian Village (七賢村), Shezhou. Others claimed that he started the rebellion in Wannian District (萬年鄉), Chun'an County. Fang La's forces captured Hangzhou and subsequently took control over parts of present-day Jiangsu, Zhejiang, Anhui and Jiangxi provinces, with a total of 52 counties and six prefectures. The rebellion may have been caused by an increasing tax burden, the concentration of landownership and oppressive government measures. Fang promised to establish an efficient government with light taxation.

Hou Meng, the governor of Bozhou, asked Song Jiang to assist Fang La in recruiting him. Zhang Shuye, the governor of Haizhou, designed to capture the deputy leader of Song Jiang's army, and Jiang and others all surrendered. Fang La announced to the world that he opposed the Zhao family's policy of exploiting the people and fawning on foreigners, and that he should not be recruited. Although Song Jiang also opposed corruption, he still respected the emperor of the Zhao family and used violence as bait to wait for the recruit.

In 1121, the Song government sent a general, Wang Yuan (王淵), to lead an army to crush the rebellion. Wang Yuan's subordinate, Han Shizhong, disguised himself, infiltrated Qingxi County and captured Fang La. Later, Xin Xingzong (辛興宗), the Song general defending Zhongzhou (忠州), led his troops to block Qingxi County's exit route and regained control of the county. Fang La and 52 of his subordinates were captured and escorted by the general Tong Guan to the imperial capital, Kaifeng. Four months later, Fang La was found guilty of treason and executed in Kaifeng. However, Han Shizhong's biography in Song Shi went on to indicate that he was denied credit for capturing Fang La by Xin Xingzong (辛兴宗); Xin took the credit for himself Instead. Both the rebel forces and the official army committed massacres, resulting in a total of two million casualties. According to Xu Zizhi Tongjian, "Women who had been captured by the rebels and managed to escape from their caves were found hanging in the forests, many of them naked; such sights could be seen for over a hundred miles."

By 1132–1133 or later, the rebellion was linked to Manichaeism. Though not originally connected, in the public and historical conscience it became confused with the Taizhou unrest of April–June 1121, where Manichaeism was widespread. The rebellion which started by Fang La was portrayed as a prototypical "heretical uprising” in Chinese historiography.

== In Water Margin ==
The classical novel Water Margin presents a semi-fictional account of Fang La and his battle with the Liangshan outlaws. After granting the outlaws amnesty, Emperor Huizong sends them on military campaigns to suppress rebel forces within the Song Empire and counter invaders from the Liao Empire in the north. Fang La is one of the rebel leaders based in the Jiangnan region.

Whilst the Liangshan forces suffered hardly any casualties in the campaigns against the Liao Empire and the rebel forces of Tian Hu and Wang Qing, the campaign against Fang La proved to be calamitous. 59 of the original 108 heroes were killed in action, mostly by Fang La's warriors, whose combat skills and abilities rival the best of Liangshan. Unlike the other rebels who lack good leadership and experience, Fang La has established a solid foundation in the Jiangnan region with many capable people serving under him.

Fang La is eventually captured by the Liangshan heroes after an elaborate infiltration scheme involving Chai Jin and Yan Qing. During his escape attempt, he is defeated by Lu Zhishen and escorted back to Kaifeng by imperial troops under Tong Guan. Four months later, Fang La is found guilty of treason and executed by lingchi.

== See also ==
- Chen Shuozhen (Female Emperor Wenjia)
