= Mount Liang =

Mountain in Liangshan County, Shandong, China

Coordinates: 35°47′11.86″N 116°5′33.10″E

Chinese name
- Chinese: 梁山
Transcriptions
Standard Mandarin
- Hanyu Pinyin: Liángshān

Alternative Chinese name
- Chinese: 梁山泊
Transcriptions
Standard Mandarin
- Hanyu Pinyin: Liángshān Pō

Japanese name
- Kanji: 梁山泊
Transcriptions
- Romanization: Ryōzanpaku

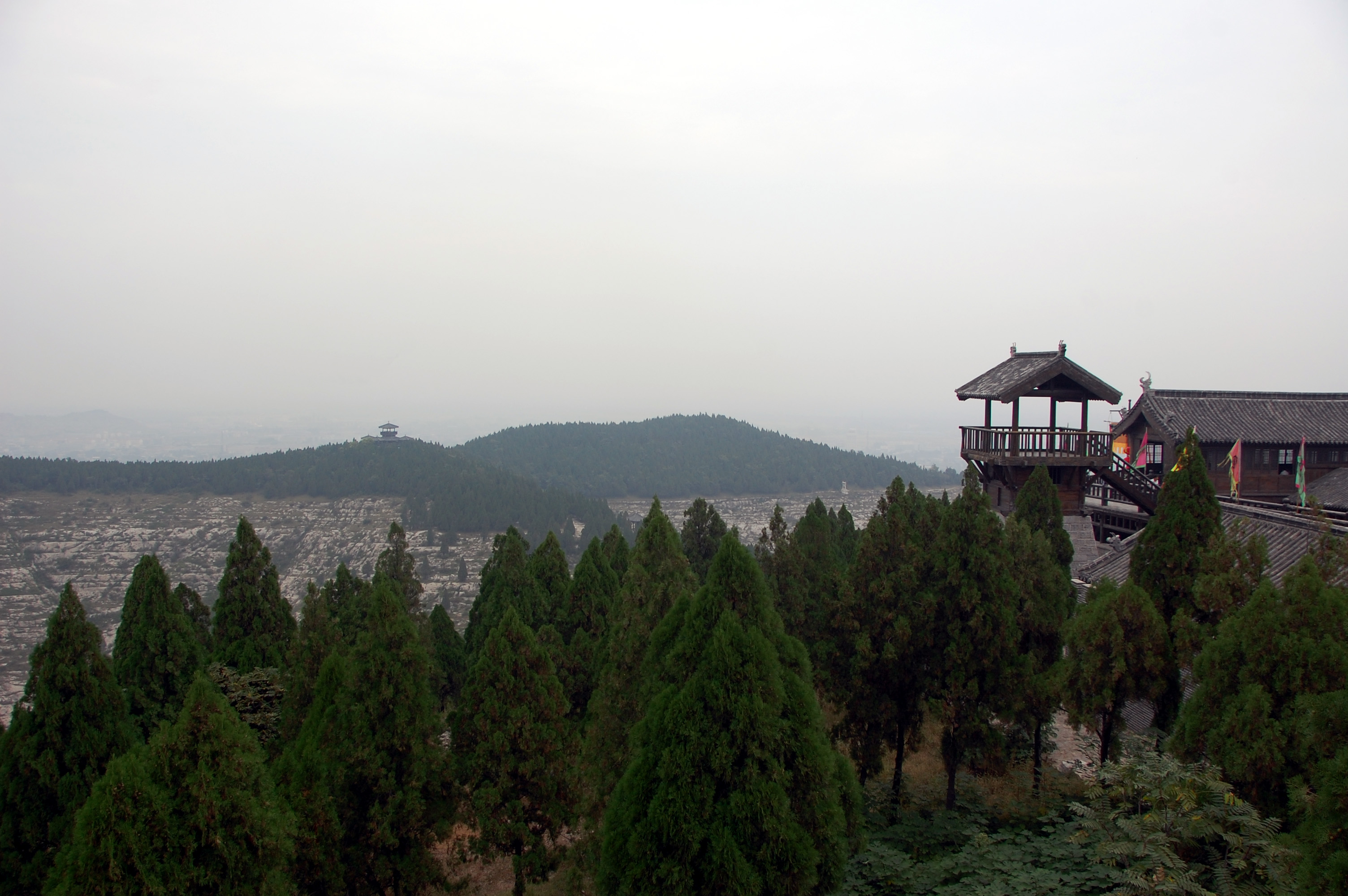
Today's Shuipo Liangshan scenic area

Mount Liang is a mountain in Liangshan County, Shandong, China, which rises to 197.9 metres above sea level. It is well known as the stronghold of the 108 Heroes in the classic Chinese novel Water Margin. The modern Liangshan County is located a few kilometres to the north and 80 kilometres west of the Beijing–Shanghai railway.

The original Mount Liang was named after the Prince of Liang (梁王), a son of Emperor Wen of the Han dynasty. After his death, the prince was buried on the mountain. The area was from prehistoric times surrounded by the largest marshland in North China, called the Daye Marsh and later the Liangshan Marsh. During the Song dynasty, the Yellow River flowed through the area. Mount Liang was located at the extreme north of what became known as the "eight hundred li moorage of Mount Liang". Because the area was largely a wasteland on the frontiers of several administrative units, government control was minimal. It is known that outlaws and bandits were active in the area during the Song dynasty, although Song Jiang – a major character in Water Margin – was not associated with the area. Some of the bandits on Mount Liang preyed selectively upon the rich and became known as "righteous bandits" (義匪; yì fěi). Legends about the heroes of Mount Liang, which provided the basis for Water Margin, probably formed from this historical context. Banditry continued on Mount Liang until the mid-17th century, when the Qing dynasty established a military garrison in present-day Liangshan County.

Water Margin describes Mount Liang in majestic terms, imagining its peak to be a plateau ringed by high mountains and protected by six passes and eight fortresses. The Yuan dynasty zaju "Black Whirlwind Presents Two Victories" (黑旋風雙獻功) envisages Mount Liang as having "72 deep rivers, garrisoned with hundreds of warships. In 36 feasting towers, there is enough food for a million soldiers and their mounts."

When the Yellow River shifted course in 1289, the marshes around Mount Liang shrank considerably. During the Ming dynasty, it had been reduced to five smaller marshlands. After the Yellow River shifted back to its northern course in 1853, the marshes were gradually filled in by sediments carried downstream by the river and human land reclamation. Today, the relatively small Dongping Lake is what remains of the great marshes.

Considerable effort has been made in recent years to develop Liangshan as a destination for tourists. A number of buildings have been erected to match descriptions given in Water Margin.
