= Tong Wei =

Fictional character in the Chinese classical novel Water Margin

- Water Margin character
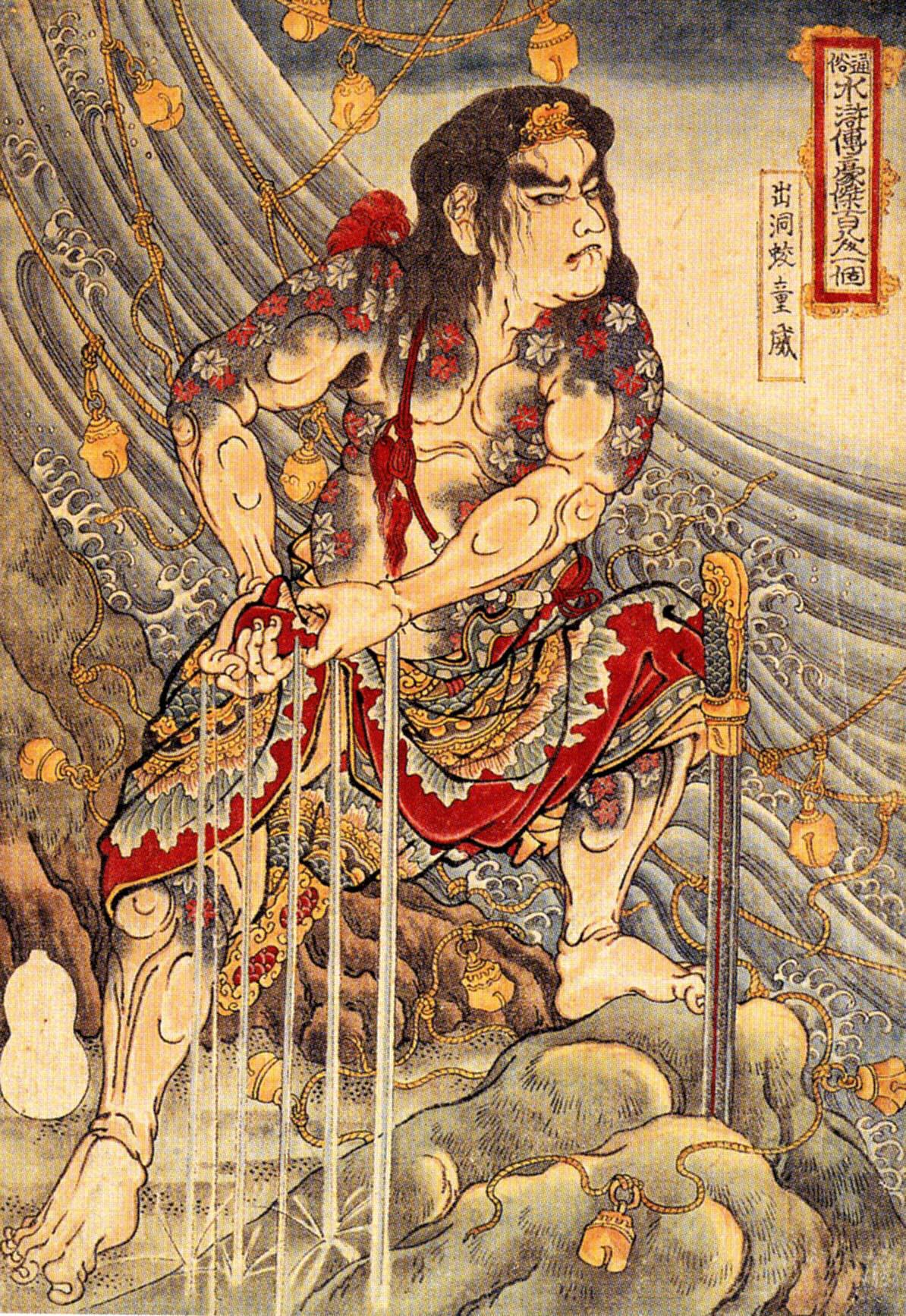
- an illustration of Tong Wei by Utagawa Kuniyoshi
- First appearance: Chapter 37

In-universe information
- Nicknames: "Dragon Emerging from a Cave" 出洞蛟
- Origin: salt smuggler
- Designation: Naval Commander of Liangshan
- Rank: 68th, Forward Star (地進星) of the 72 Earthly Fiends
- Ancestral home / Place of origin: Jieyang Ridge (believed to be in present-day Jiujiang, Jiangxi)

Chinese names
- Simplified Chinese: 童威
- Traditional Chinese: 童威
- Pinyin: Tóng Wēi
- Wade–Giles: T'ung Wei

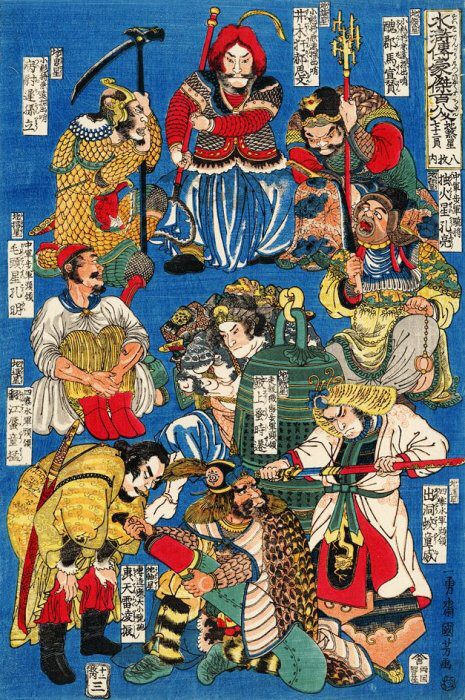
An illustration of nine of the 108 Heroes by Utagawa Kuniyoshi. Clockwise from top: Hao Siwen, Xuan Zan, Kong Liang, Shi Qian, Tong Wei, Ling Zhen, Tong Meng, Kong Ming, and Sun Li.

Tong Wei is a fictional character in Water Margin, one of the Classic Chinese Novels. Nicknamed "Dragon Emerging from a Cave", he ranks 68th among the 108 Heroes and 32nd among the 72 Earthly Fiends.

== Background ==
Tong Wei and his younger brother Tong Meng are first introduced in the novel as the companions of Li Jun. The brothers and Li Jun are known for their exceptional swimming skills and ability to fight well both on land and in water. They live at Jieyang Ridge (揭陽嶺; believed to be in present-day Jiujiang, Jiangxi) and run a salt smuggling operation on the Xunyang River. Their friend, Li Li, runs a tavern at the ridge to drug, rob and murder unsuspecting customers.

== Meeting Song Jiang ==
The Tong brothers and Li Jun first meet Song Jiang when he passes by Jieyang Ridge on his way to Jiangzhou (江州; present-day Jiujiang, Jiangxi), where he has been exiled to for killing Yan Poxi. While taking a rest in Li Li's tavern, Song Jiang and his two escorts unsuspectingly consume drinks spiked with menghanyao (蒙汗藥), a drug which causes dizziness and unconsciousness.

Li Jun and the Tong brothers, who have long heard of Song Jiang's reputation for his chivalry and generosity, have been hoping to meet him at the riverbank. When they learn that Li Li has drugged an exile, they head to the tavern and find an official document on the escorts confirming Song Jiang's identity. They then get Li Li to revive Song Jiang and apologise to him, after which they introduce themselves to Song and treat him hospitably before seeing him off.

Song Jiang passes by the nearby Jieyang Town later and unknowingly offends the brothers Mu Hong and Mu Chun, who seek to harm him. While fleeing, Song Jiang desperately boards a boat operated by Zhang Heng. When the boat reaches the middle of the Xunyang River, Zhang Heng reveals himself as a pirate and wants to rob and kill Song Jiang.

Just then, Li Jun and the Tong brothers show up to stop Zhang Heng, and introduce Song Jiang to him. Zhang Heng, upon realising the man he tried to rob is the chivalrous man he has long admired, immediately apologises and ferries him back to Jieyang Town. Li Jun then introduces Song Jiang to the Mu brothers, who are shocked to learn of his identity and apologise to him. They treat Song Jiang as an honoured guest before he leaves with his escorts to continue his journey to Jiangzhou.

== Becoming an outlaw ==
Song Jiang later runs into trouble in Jiangzhou when he writes a seditious poem after getting drunk. He is arrested and sentenced to death, but his outlaw friends from Liangshan Marsh show up in full force, storm the execution ground, and save him.

After fleeing Jiangzhou, the whole lot gets stranded in a temple at the riverbank while government forces close in. At that moment, the Tong brothers, Li Jun, Li Li, and the others whom Song Jiang has met and befriended earlier at Jieyang Ridge suddenly appear in their boats and ferry everyone to safety. After that, the Tong brothers and the others join the outlaw band at Liangshan Marsh.

== Campaigns ==
Tong Wei is appointed as a commander of the Liangshan navy after the 108 Heroes are fully assembled. He participates in the campaigns against the Liao invaders and rebel forces in Song territory after the outlaws receive amnesty from Emperor Huizong.

During the final campaign against Fang La's rebel forces, the Tong brothers and Li Jun infiltrate Suzhou to sabotage its defences, allowing the Liangshan forces to breach and capture the city.

== Later life ==
The final campaign against Fang La costs the lives of nearly two-thirds of the 108 Heroes; Li Jun and the Tong brothers are among the few survivors. Unwilling to continue serving the corrupt Song government, Li Jun feigns illness while the survivors are en route to the Song capital to report their victory, and remains in Suzhou. The Tong brothers also stay behind to take care of him.

In legend, Li Jun, the Tong brothers, and the friends they made at Lake Tai later travel to Taicang, from which they set sail into the open sea. They eventually arrive and settle in Siam, where Li Jun becomes the king while the Tong brothers and their other companions serve as his subjects.
