= Guan Sheng =

Fictional character in the Chinese classical novel Water Margin

- Water Margin character
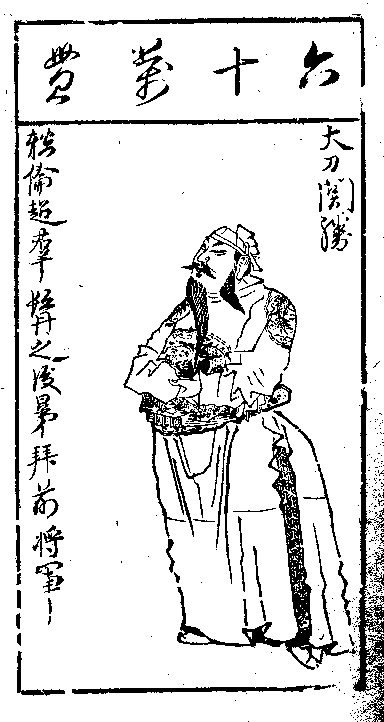
- an illustration of Guan Sheng by Chen Hongshou
- First appearance: Chapter 63

In-universe information
- Nicknames: "Great Blade" 大刀
- Weapon: Green Dragon Crescent Blade (青龍偃月刀)
- Origin: military officer
- Designation: Left General of the Five Tiger Generals of Liangshan
- Rank: 5th, Brave Star (天勇星) of the 36 Heavenly Spirits
- Ancestral home / Place of origin: Yuncheng, Shanxi

Chinese names
- Simplified Chinese: 关胜
- Traditional Chinese: 關勝
- Pinyin: Guān Shèng
- Wade–Giles: Kuan Sheng

Guan Sheng is a fictional character in Water Margin, one of the Classic Chinese Novels. Nicknamed "Great Blade", he ranks fifth among the 36 Heavenly Spirits, the first third of the 108 Heroes.

== Background ==
Guan Sheng is a descendant of Guan Yu and he resembles his ancestor in appearance. Standing at a height of eight chi and six cun, he has a flowing beard, long eyebrows, and eyes like those of a fenghuang. His weapon of choice is a guandao like his ancestor's, earning him the nickname "Great Blade". His horse is also called the "Red Hare" (赤兔馬) like his ancestor's. Despite his background and combat prowess, he starts out as a xunjian (巡檢) – a law enforcement officer in charge of patrolling and maintaining security in an area – in the east of Puzhou (蒲州; present-day Yuncheng, Shanxi). He has a sworn brother, Hao Siwen, who also serves as a military officer in Puzhou.

== Battle against Liangshan ==
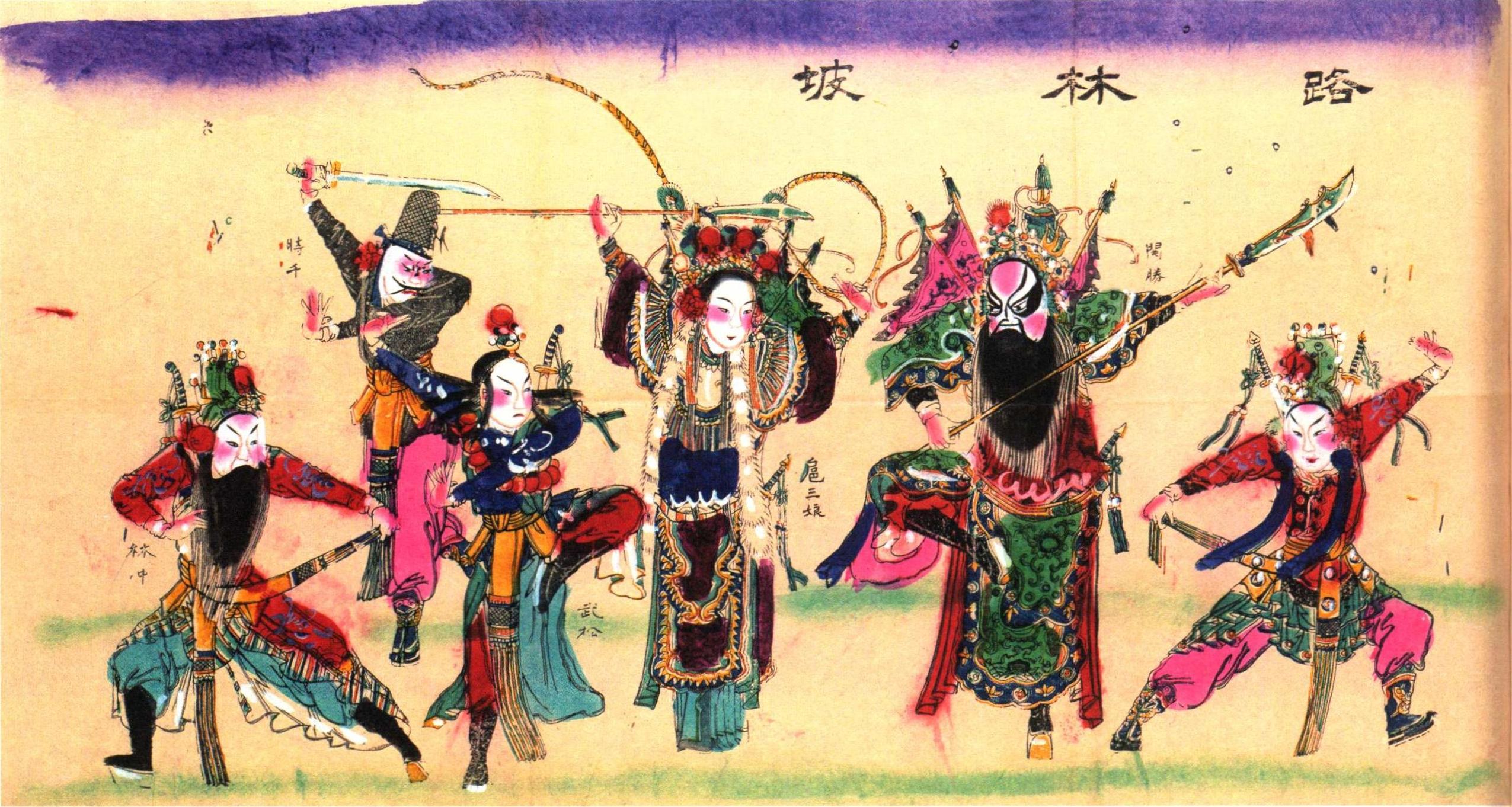
Lulin Slope (路林坡), depicting Guan Sheng (second from right) confronting Hu Sanniang, while Wu Song, Shi Qian, and Lin Chong stand by on the sidelines to provide support. Woodblock print, early republican period, housed in Waseda University Library.

When the outlaws from Liangshan Marsh are attacking Daming Prefecture (大名府; present-day Daming County, Hebei) to save their imprisoned fellows, the Grand Tutor Cai Jing holds a meeting in the imperial capital Dongjing (東京; present-day Kaifeng, Henan) to discuss how to deal with the situation. During this time, Xuan Zan, a military officer, recommends Guan Sheng to lead the government forces to fight the outlaws. Guan Sheng is then summoned from Puzhou to Dongjing, where he meets Cai Jing, who is so impressed with him that he puts Guan Sheng in command of the mission, with Xuan Zan and Hao Siwen serving as his lieutenants.

Using the strategy of "besieging Wei to rescue Zhao", Guan Sheng attacks the outlaws' base at Liangshan Marsh to force them to withdraw from Daming Prefecture. During this time, Zhang Heng, one of the outlaws, stages an unsanctioned raid on Guan Sheng's camp but ends up falling into a trap and getting captured. Ruan Xiaoqi, another outlaw, attempts to save Zhang Heng but gets taken captive too.

Meanwhile, the Liangshan commander Song Jiang hears of Guan Sheng, and hopes to win him over to join the Liangshan cause. He works out a plan with Huyan Zhuo, a former general who has joined Liangshan, to lure Guan Sheng into a trap. Huyan Zhuo travels alone to meet Guan Sheng, lying that he has only pretended to join the outlaws and now wants to clear his name. Guan Sheng believes Huyan Zhuo after the latter apparently defeats a Liangshan leader in battle. Acting on Huyan Zhuo's instruction, he leads his troops to raid Song Jiang's camp at night, but finds himself falling into a trap and getting captured. Song Jiang treats Guan Sheng respectfully and explains Liangshan's mission to him. Touched by Song Jiang's sincerity, Guan Sheng, along with Xuan Zan and Hao Siwen, defect and join the outlaws.

== Life as an outlaw ==
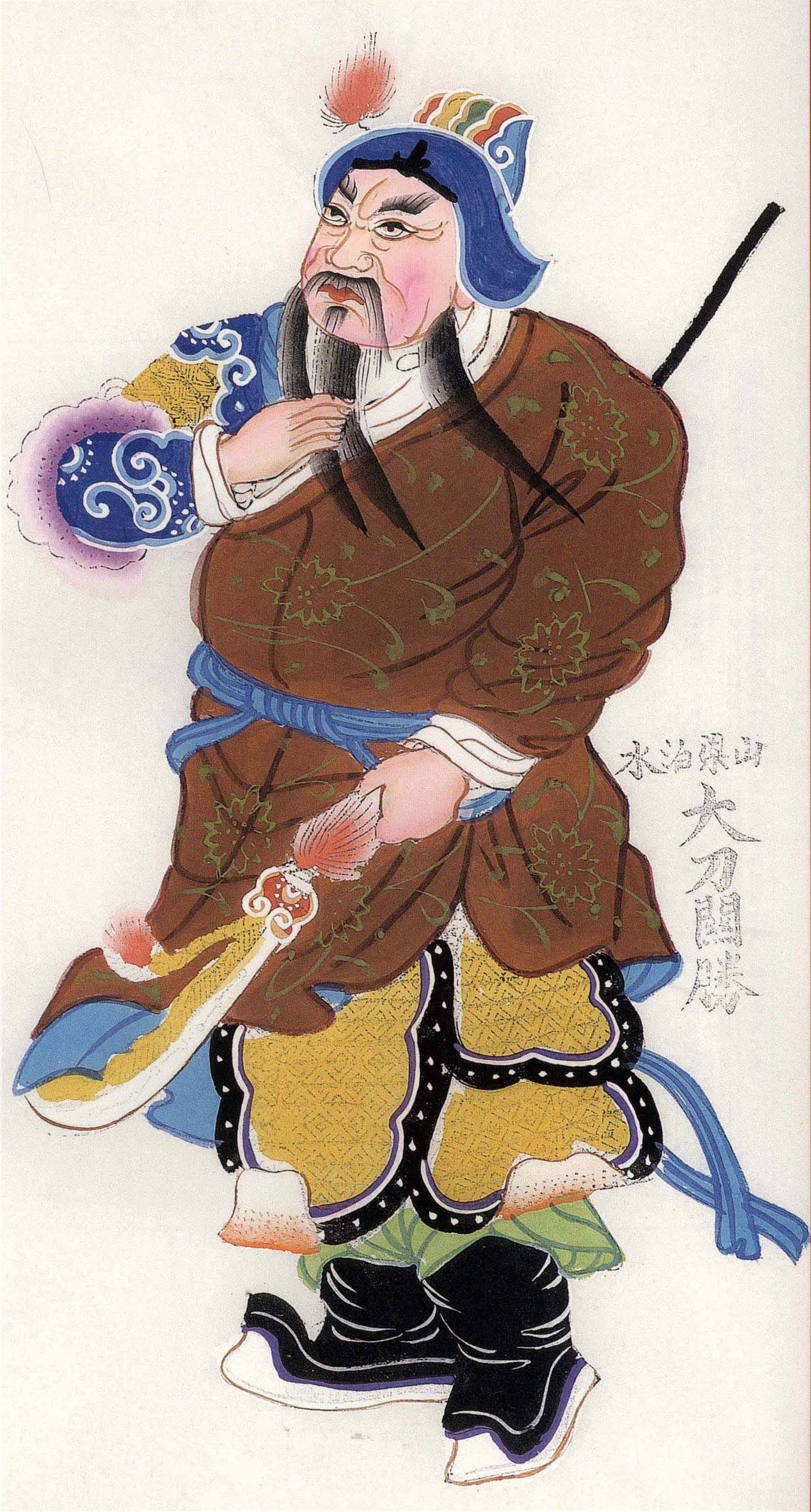
Portraits of Guan Sheng as door god

After hearing of Guan Sheng's defection, the government sends Shan Tinggui and Wei Dingguo to lead forces to attack Liangshan. Guan Sheng volunteers to lead Liangshan forces to attack the enemy at Lingzhou (凌州; in present-day Dezhou, Shandong). In the first round of battle, Guan Sheng's lieutenants Xuan Zan and Hao Siwen are lured into traps by Shan Tinggui and Wei Dingguo, and end up being taken captive.

In the next round, Guan Sheng challenges Shan Tinggui to a duel outside Lingzhou, feigning defeat to lure Shan to chase him and then catching Shan off guard and knocking him off horseback. Instead of killing his opponent, Guan Sheng warmly converses with Shan Tinggui, earns his respect, and convinces him to join the Liangshan cause. They return to Lingzhou to find Wei Dingguo, who has been forced to flee to a nearby county after the outlaws take Lingzhou. There, Shan Tinggui and Guan Sheng meet Wei Dingguo and manage to convince him to surrender and join Liangshan as well.

== Death ==
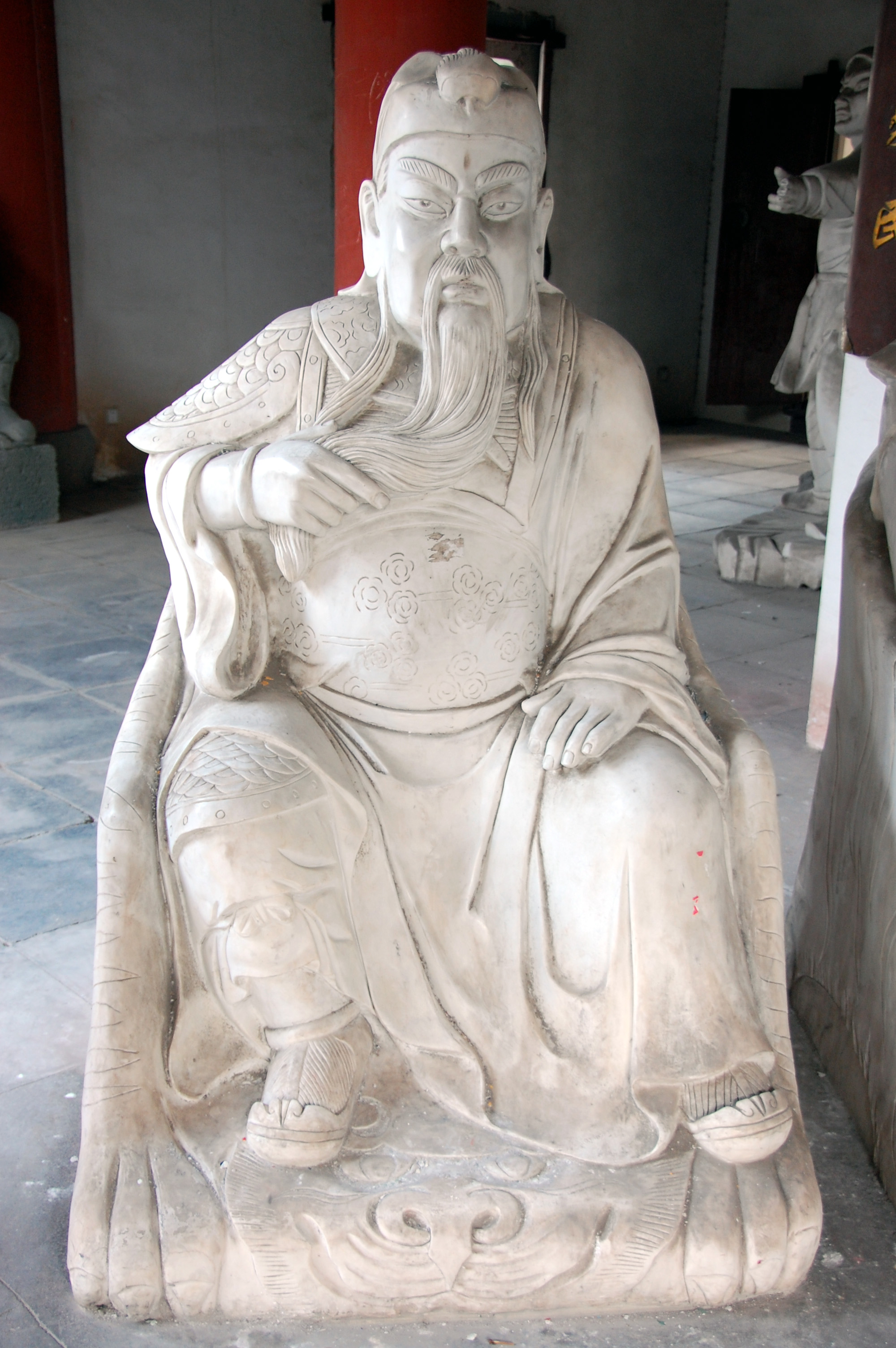
A stone statue of Guan Sheng at Hengdian World Studios.

Guan Sheng is appointed as one of the Five Tiger Generals of the Liangshan cavalry after the 108 Heroes are fully assembled. He participates in the campaigns against the Liao invaders and rebel forces in Song territory after Emperor Huizong grants amnesty to the outlaws.

By the time the campaigns are over, Guan Sheng is one of the few surviving Liangshan heroes. To honour him for his contributions, the emperor commissions him as a full general and appoints him as the commander of cavalry forces in Daming Prefecture. He gets drunk one day after celebrating a successful drill, falls off his horse, and eventually dies of his injuries.
