= Hao Siwen =

Fictional character in the Chinese classical novel Water Margin

- Water Margin character
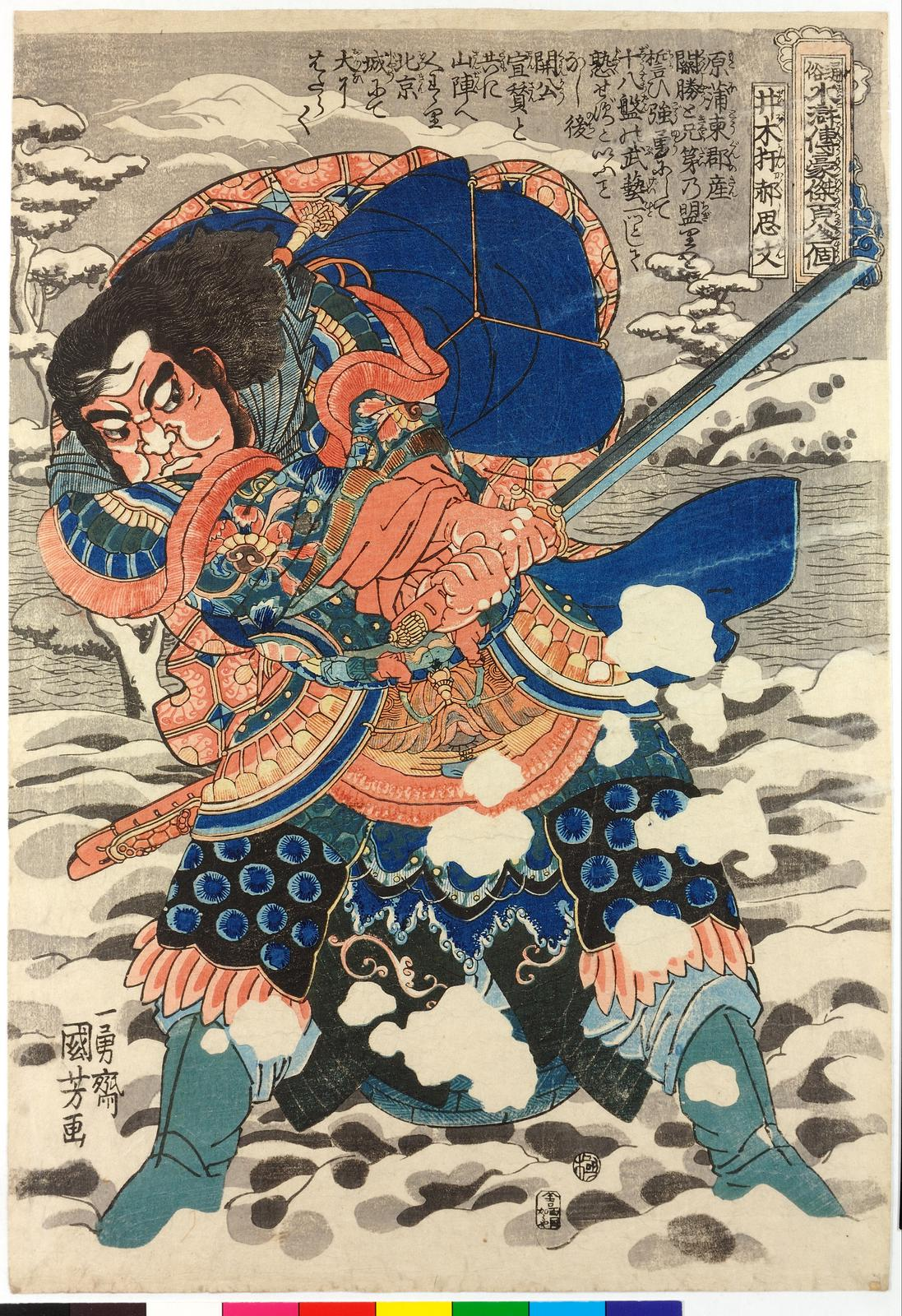
- an illustration of Hao Siwen by Utagawa Kuniyoshi
- First appearance: Chapter 63

In-universe information
- Nicknames: "Wood Dog of Well" 井木犴
- Origin: military officer
- Designation: Tiger Cub Patrol Commander of Liangshan
- Rank: 41st, Magnificent Star (地雄星) of the 72 Earthly Fiends

Chinese names
- Simplified Chinese: 郝思文
- Traditional Chinese: 郝思文
- Pinyin: Hǎo Sīwén
- Wade–Giles: Hao Szu-wen

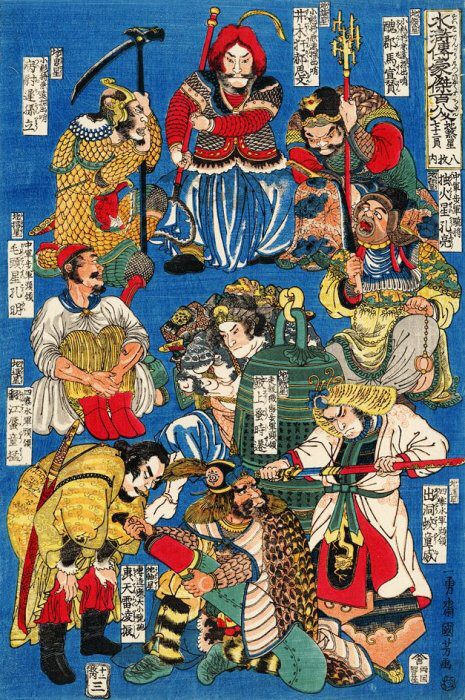
An illustration of nine of the 108 Heroes by Utagawa Kuniyoshi. Clockwise from top: Hao Siwen, Xuan Zan, Kong Liang, Shi Qian, Tong Wei, Ling Zhen, Tong Meng, Kong Ming, and Sun Li.

Hao Siwen is a fictional character in Water Margin, one of the Classic Chinese Novels. Nicknamed "Wood Dog of Well", he ranks 41st among the 108 Heroes and fifth among the 72 Earthly Fiends.

== Background ==
Hao Siwen is nicknamed "Wood Dog of Well" (Note: Well is one of the Twenty-Eight Mansions in Chinese astronomy. Symbolised by a dog, it represents Wood of the Five Elements.) after a stellar deity residing in Gemini as his mother had dreamt of the deity shortly before she became pregnant with him.

A skilled warrior, Hao Siwen serves as a military officer in Puzhou (蒲州; present-day Yuncheng, Shanxi) along with his sworn brother, Guan Sheng.

== Becoming an outlaw ==
Hao Siwen is first introduced in the novel when he and Guan Sheng are recommended by Xuan Zan, also a military officer, to the Grand Tutor Cai Jing to lead government forces to destroy the outlaws at Liangshan Marsh. Cai Jing summons Guan Sheng and Hao Siwen to the capital Dongjing (東京; present-day Kaifeng, Henan) and puts Guan Sheng in charge of the mission, with Hao Siwen and Xuan Zan serving as his deputies.

At the time, the outlaws are besieging Daming Prefecture (大名府; present-day Daming County, Hebei). To lift the siege, Guan Sheng leads his troops to attack the outlaw stronghold at Liangshan.

Eventually, Guan Sheng falls for a ruse by Huyan Zhuo, a former military officer who has joined the outlaws, and gets captured by the outlaws. Hao Siwen and Xuan Zan are also defeated and taken captive by Liangshan's Qin Ming and Hu Sanniang respectively. The outlaw commander Song Jiang treats the three captives respectfully and moves them with his sincerity, convincing them to surrender and join Liangshan.

== Battle of Lingzhou ==
After Guan Sheng's defection, Grand Tutor Cai Jing orders Shan Tinggui and Wei Dingguo, two military officers based in Lingzhou (凌州; in present-day Dezhou, Shandong), to lead government forces to attack the Liangshan outlaws.

Eager to prove himself, Guan Sheng volunteers to lead Liangshan forces to engage the enemy, with Hao Siwen and Xuan Zan serving as his lieutenants. In their first clash, Hao Siwen and Xuan Zan are lured by Shan Tinggui and Wei Dingguo respectively into traps and end up being taken captive.

While Shan Tinggui and Wei Dingguo remain behind to fight Guan Sheng, they order their men to escort Hao Siwen and Xuan Zan in prison carts back to the capital.

En route, the convoy is intercepted at Deadwood Hill (枯樹山) in Kouzhou (寇州; present-day Guan County, Shandong) by a group of outlaws led by Li Kui, Jiao Ting and Bao Xu. The two men are freed and they join the outlaws in attacking and capturing Lingzhou while Wei Dingguo is out fighting Guan Sheng.

Shan Tinggui, who has been defeated and captured earlier by Guan Sheng, has surrendered and joined the Liangshan outlaws. He comes to meet Wei Dingguo and manages to convince him to do the same.

== Campaigns and death ==
Hao Siwen is appointed as a Tiger Cub Patrol Commander of the Liangshan cavalry after the 108 Heroes are fully assembled. He participates in the campaigns against the Liao invaders and rebel forces in Song territory after the outlaws receive amnesty from Emperor Huizong.

During the final campaign against Fang La's rebel forces, Hao Siwen and Xu Ning are assigned to watch the north gate of Hangzhou while Liangshan forces are besieging the city. The enemy launches a surprise attack, catching them off guard and capturing Hao Siwen. Xu Ning attempts to save Hao Siwen but gets hit by a poisoned arrow. Hao Siwen is ultimately beheaded and dismembered by Fang La's son, Fang Tianding.
