= Kong Ming (Water Margin) =

Fictional character in the Chinese classical novel Water Margin

- Water Margin character
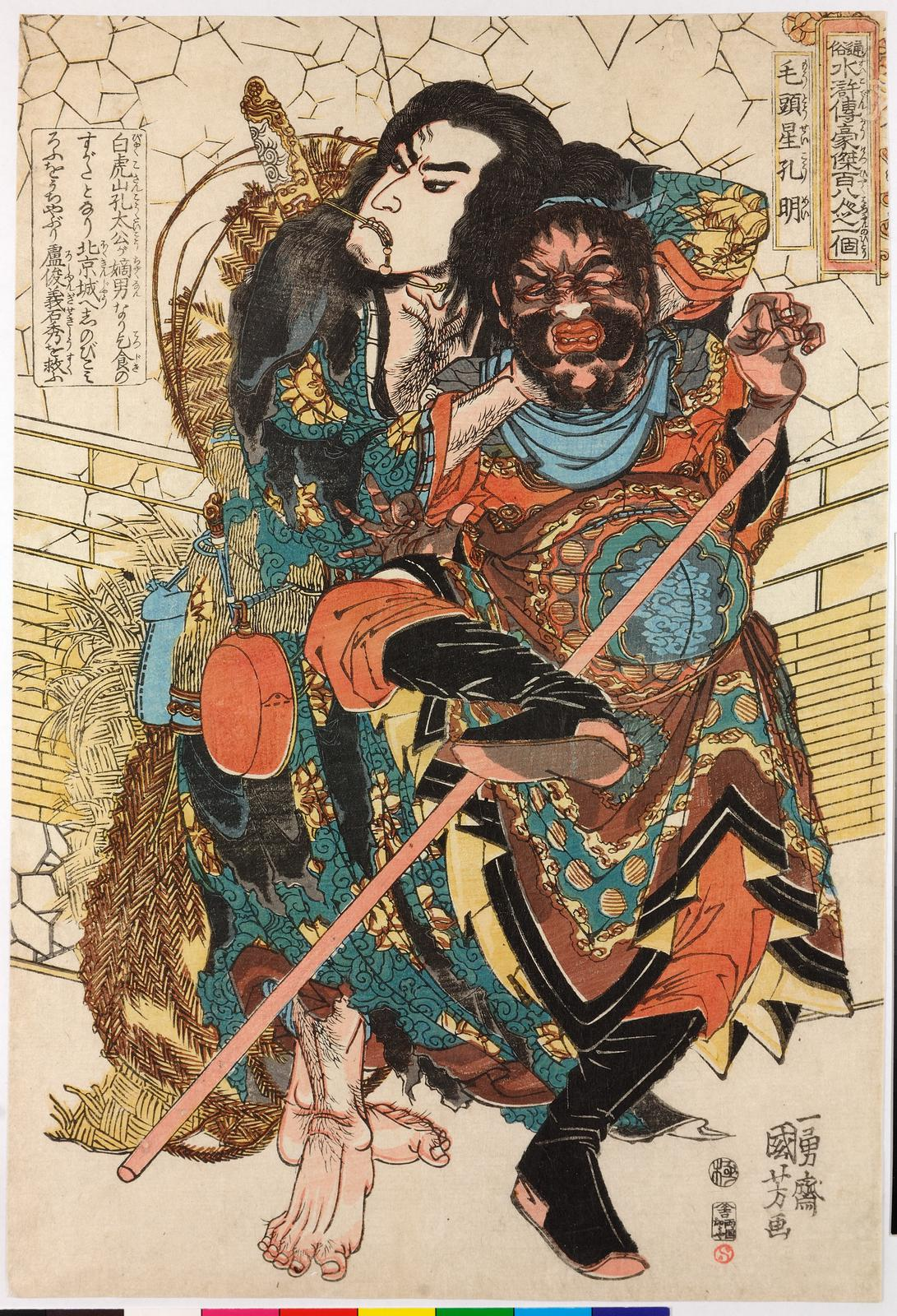
- an illustration of Kong Ming (left) fighting an enemy by Utagawa Kuniyoshi
- First appearance: Chapter 57

In-universe information
- Nicknames: "Hairy Star" 毛頭星
- Weapon: spear
- Origin: scion
- Designation: Central Camp Guardian of Liangshan
- Rank: 62nd, Wild Star (地猖星) of the 72 Earthly Fiends
- Ancestral home / Place of origin: Qingzhou (in present-day Shandong)

Chinese names
- Simplified Chinese: 孔明
- Traditional Chinese: 孔明
- Pinyin: Kǒng Míng
- Wade–Giles: K'ung Ming

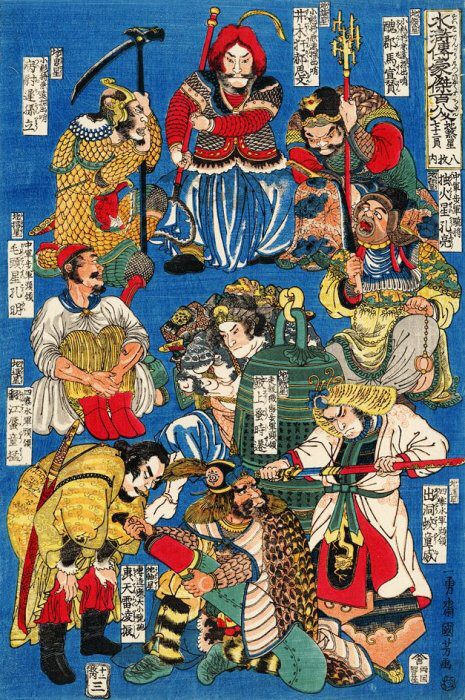
An illustration of nine of the 108 Heroes by Utagawa Kuniyoshi. Clockwise from top: Hao Siwen, Xuan Zan, Kong Liang, Shi Qian, Tong Wei, Ling Zhen, Tong Meng, Kong Ming, and Sun Li.

Kong Ming is a fictional character in Water Margin, one of the Classic Chinese Novels. Nicknamed "Hairy Star", he ranks 62nd among the 108 Heroes and 26th among the 72 Earthly Fiends.

== Background ==
Kong Ming, along with his younger brother Kong Liang and their father Squire Kong, lives in a manor at Mount White Tiger (白虎山) in Qingzhou (in present-day Shandong). He is nicknamed "Hairy Star" while his brother is nicknamed "Lonely Fiery Star".

== Meeting Song Jiang ==
The Kong brothers are first introduced in the novel when they meet Song Jiang, who is on the run after killing Yan Poxi to cover up his connections to the outlaws at Liangshan Marsh. Song Jiang, who has previously taken shelter in the residence of the nobleman Chai Jin, is invited by Squire Kong to live at the Kongs' manor. During his stay, Song Jiang briefly trains the Kong brothers in martial arts.

== Encounter with Wu Song ==
The Kong brothers appear in the novel again when Wu Song is on the run after killing corrupt officials in Mengzhou. While passing by Mount White Tiger, Wu Song stops at a tavern for a meal, and is told that the tavern serves only simple dishes and drinks. Kong Liang comes in for a meal too, and gets served with better food and drinks. Wu Song, thinking that the owner is snubbing him, violently confronts the owner, who insists that Kong Liang provided the ingredients for his own meal. Kong Liang intervenes and gets into a fight with Wu Song, who easily beats him up.

Kong Liang flees and returns with his brother and more men later to take revenge on Wu Song. They find a drunk Wu Song lying in a creek, capture him, and take him back to their manor, where they tie him to a tree and whip him. Song Jiang, who is still staying with the Kongs then, comes to see what the commotion is about and recognises Wu Song, whom he has met and befriended earlier. Song Jiang then gets the Kong brothers to release Wu Song, and introduces Wu Song to them. Shocked at learning that the man they just beat up is the famous tiger slayer, the Kong brothers apologise to Wu Song and treat him as an honoured guest before seeing him off later.

== Becoming an outlaw ==
After their father's death, the Kong brothers get into a dispute with a wealthy landlord and end up killing him. They then become outlaws and set up a stronghold on Mount White Tiger. Their uncle, who lives in Qingzhou, gets implicated and thrown into prison by the governor, Murong Yanda. The Kong brothers lead their outlaw followers to attack Qingzhou to free their uncle, but they are defeated and Kong Ming gets captured in battle by Huyan Zhuo. Huyan Zhuo, a military officer who has just been defeated in battle by the outlaws from Liangshan Marsh, has taken shelter in Qingzhou under Murong Yanda and hopes to redeem himself by helping the governor wipe out the outlaw groups in the region.

Kong Liang seeks help from the other outlaw groups in Qingzhou; they decide to turn to their counterparts at Liangshan Marsh for assistance when they realise they are all no match for Huyan Zhuo. The Liangshan outlaws, led by Song Jiang, come to attack Qingzhou and defeat the government forces. Huyan Zhuo, after being captured, decides to surrender and join the outlaws. The outlaws break into Qingzhou and rescue Kong Ming and his uncle, after which the Kong brothers formally join the Liangshan outlaw band.

== Campaigns and death ==
After the 108 Heroes are fully assembled, the Kong brothers are appointed as guardians of the central camp to oversee the protection of the commanders whenever Liangshan forces go to battle. Kong Ming participates in the campaigns against the Liao invaders and rebel forces in Song territory after the outlaws receive amnesty from Emperor Huizong.

During the final campaign against Fang La's rebel forces, Kong Ming falls sick after the battle of Hangzhou and eventually succumbs to illness.
