= Xuan Zan =

Fictional character in the Chinese classical novel Water Margin

- Water Margin character
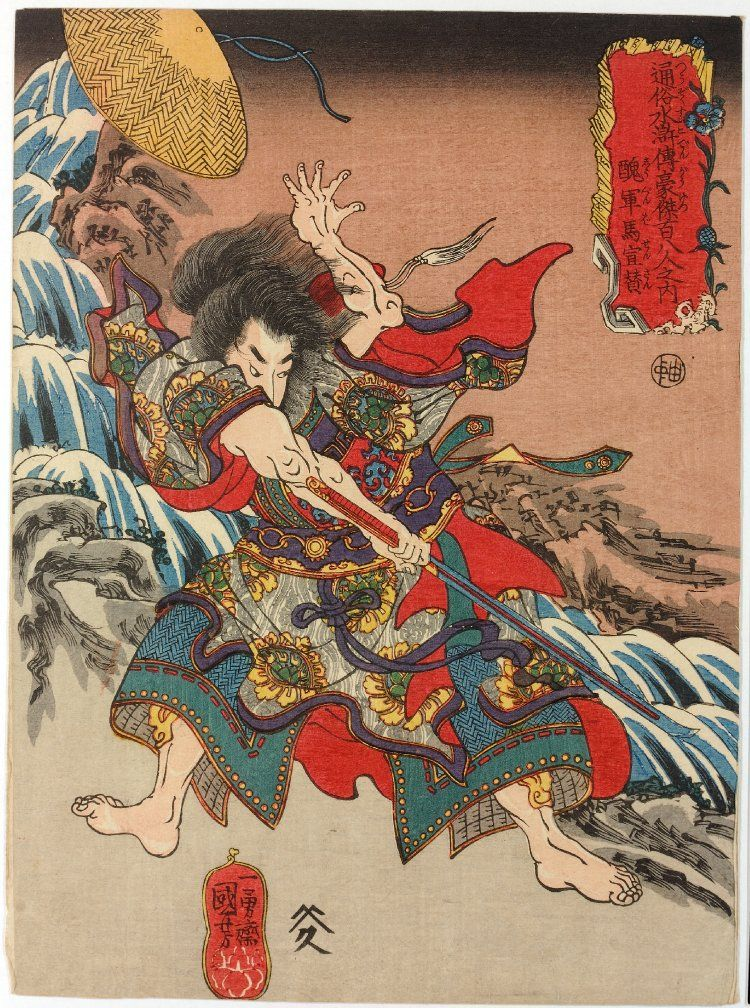
- an illustration of Xuan Zan by Utagawa Kuniyoshi
- First appearance: Chapter 63

In-universe information
- Nicknames: "Ugly Prince Consort" 醜郡馬
- Weapon: Sabre
- Origin: military officer
- Designation: Tiger Cub Patrol Commander of Liangshan
- Rank: 40th, Prominence Star (地傑星) of the 72 Earthly Fiends

Chinese names
- Simplified Chinese: 宣赞
- Traditional Chinese: 宣贊
- Pinyin: Xuān Zàn
- Wade–Giles: Hsüan Tsan

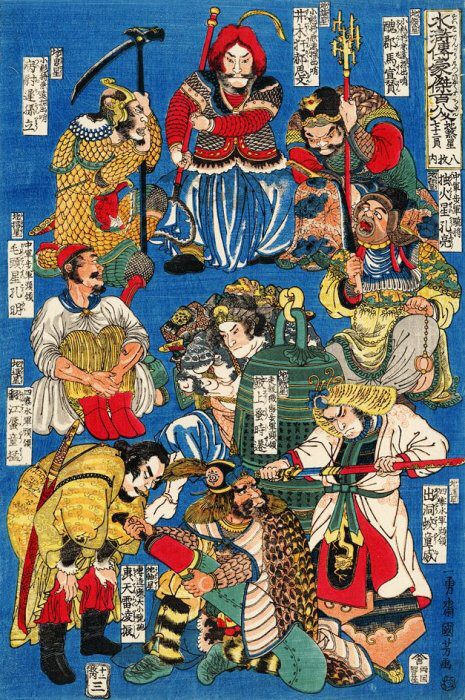
An illustration of nine of the 108 Heroes by Utagawa Kuniyoshi. Clockwise from top: Hao Siwen, Xuan Zan, Kong Liang, Shi Qian, Tong Wei, Ling Zhen, Tong Meng, Kong Ming, and Sun Li.

Xuan Zan is a fictional character in Water Margin, one of the Classic Chinese Novels. Nicknamed "Ugly Prince Consort", he ranks 40th among the 108 Heroes and fourth among the 72 Earthly Fiends.

== Background ==
The novel describes Xuan Zan as an eight chi-tall man with a face like the charred bottom of a wok, an upward pointing nose, messy grass-like hair, and a reddish beard. A highly-skilled warrior and archer, he specialises in fighting with a long sabre.

Xuan Zan impresses a junwang (commandery prince) after beating foreign contestants in archery, and wins the hand of marriage of the prince's daughter, hence he is nicknamed "Ugly Prince Consort". The marriage turns out to be an unhappy one as the princess hates Xuan Zan for his appearance, and she soon dies of illness.

As a result, Xuan Zan falls out of his father-in-law's favour, and gets relegated to the role of a low-ranking military officer in the capital, Dongjing (東京; present-day Kaifeng, Henan).

== Becoming an outlaw ==
Xuan Zan is first introduced in the novel when he recommends Guan Sheng to the Grand Tutor Cai Jing to lead government forces to destroy the outlaws at Liangshan Marsh. Cai Jing summons Guan Sheng and his sworn brother Hao Siwen to the capital Dongjing (東京; present-day Kaifeng, Henan) and puts Guan Sheng in charge of the mission, with Xuan Zan and Hao Siwen serving as his deputies.

At the time, the outlaws are besieging Daming Prefecture (大名府; present-day Daming County, Hebei). To lift the siege, Guan Sheng leads his troops to attack the outlaw stronghold at Liangshan.

Eventually, Guan Sheng falls for a ruse by Huyan Zhuo, a former military officer who has joined the outlaws, and gets captured by the outlaws. Hao Siwen and Xuan Zan are also defeated and taken captive by Liangshan's Qin Ming and Hu Sanniang respectively. The outlaw commander Song Jiang treats the three captives respectfully and moves them with his sincerity, convincing them to surrender and join Liangshan.

== Battle of Lingzhou ==
After Guan Sheng's defection, Grand Tutor Cai Jing orders Shan Tinggui and Wei Dingguo, two military officers based in Lingzhou (凌州; in present-day Dezhou, Shandong), to lead government forces to attack the Liangshan outlaws.

Eager to prove himself, Guan Sheng volunteers to lead Liangshan forces to engage the enemy, with Xuan Zan and Hao Siwen serving as his lieutenants. In their first clash, Hao Siwen and Xuan Zan are lured by Shan Tinggui and Wei Dingguo respectively into traps and end up being taken captive.

While Shan Tinggui and Wei Dingguo remain behind to fight Guan Sheng, they order their men to escort Xuan Zan and Hao Siwen in prison carts back to the capital.

En route, the convoy is intercepted at Deadwood Hill (枯樹山) in Kouzhou (寇州; present-day Guan County, Shandong) by a group of outlaws led by Li Kui, Jiao Ting and Bao Xu. The two men are freed and they join the outlaws in attacking and capturing Lingzhou while Wei Dingguo is out fighting Guan Sheng.

Shan Tinggui, who has been defeated and captured earlier by Guan Sheng, has surrendered and joined the Liangshan outlaws. He comes to meet Wei Dingguo and manages to convince him to do the same.

== Campaigns and death ==
Xuan Zan is appointed as a Tiger Cub Patrol Commander of the Liangshan cavalry after the 108 Heroes are fully assembled. He participates in the campaigns against the Liao invaders and the rebel forces in Song territory after the outlaws receive amnesty from Emperor Huizong.

During the final campaign against Fang La's rebel forces, Xuan Zan is assigned to attack Suzhou. He faces the enemy warrior Guo Shiguang in battle, and they end up killing each other.
