= Zhang Heng (Water Margin) =

Fictional character in the Chinese classical novel Water Margin

- Water Margin character
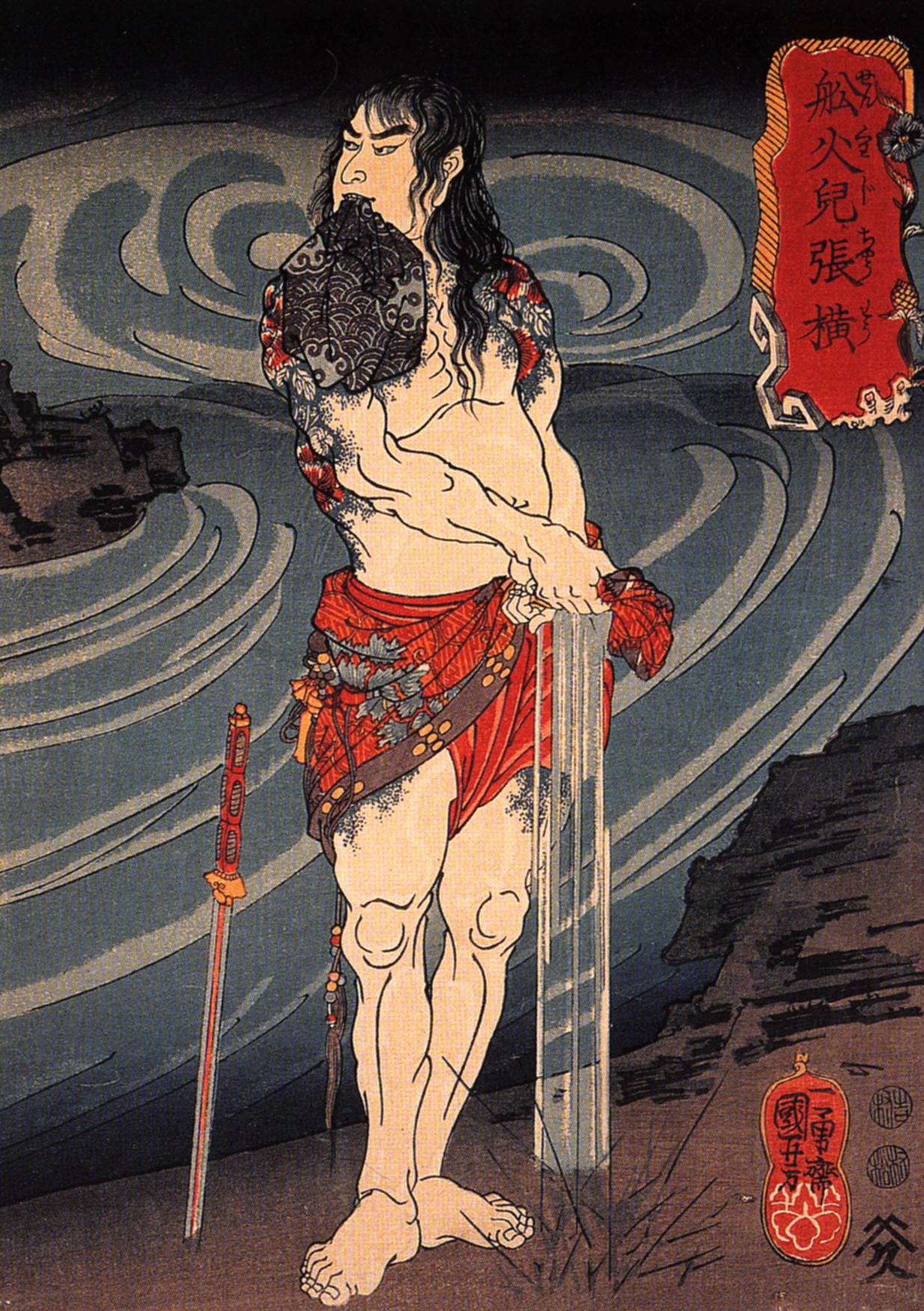
- an illustration of Zhang Heng by Utagawa Kuniyoshi
- First appearance: Chapter 37

In-universe information
- Nicknames: "Boatman" 船火兒
- Origin: pirate
- Designation: Naval Commander of Liangshan
- Rank: 28th, Balance Star (天平星) of the 36 Heavenly Spirits

Chinese names
- Simplified Chinese: 张横
- Traditional Chinese: 張橫
- Pinyin: Zhāng Héng
- Wade–Giles: Chang Heng

Zhang Heng is a fictional character in Water Margin, one of the Classic Chinese Novels. Nicknamed "Boatman", he ranks 28th among the 36 Heavenly Spirits, the first third of the 108 Heroes.

== Historical basis ==
The character Zhang Heng is inspired by a historical figure. During the Jin–Song wars between the Jin and Song dynasties, the former defeated the latter in the Jingkang Incident of 1127, forcing many people living on both sides of the Yellow River to submit to Jin rule. Among them, there was one Zhang Heng from Taiyuan who rallied about 2,000 men at the Taihang Mountains and staged a rebellion against the Jin dynasty in Lanzhou and Xianzhou. In 1135, Jin government forces attacked the rebels, but were defeated and their commander was taken captive.

== Background ==
The novel describes Zhang Heng as a seven chi-tall man with triangular-shaped glowing eyes, reddish hair, and yellowish facial hair. Nicknamed "Boatman", he is known for being an excellent swimmer and a skilled fighter on both land and in the water. He disguises himself as a simple boatman, pretending to ferry unwary travellers across the Xunyang River and seizing the opportunity to rob them.

Zhang Heng has a younger brother, Zhang Shun, who used to collude with him to rob travellers without harming anyone. Zhang Shun would disguise himself as a passenger on the boat and pretend to put up a struggle when Zhang Heng "robbed" him before throwing him into the river. The other passengers, shocked by what they had witnessed, would surrender their valuables to Zhang Heng and beg for their lives. Meanwhile, Zhang Shun, who is also a powerful swimmer, would stealthily swim back to the riverbank.

After Zhang Shun moves to the nearby Jiangzhou (江州; present-day Jiujiang, Jiangxi) to make a living as a fishmonger, Zhang Heng continues to be a pirate. Without his brother's assistance, Zhang Heng now simply kills his victims after robbing them. Zhang Heng is also close friends with Li Jun and the Tong brothers (Tong Wei and Tong Meng), who run a salt smuggling operation on the Xunyang River.

== Meeting Song Jiang ==
Zhang Heng is first introduced in the novel when he meets Song Jiang, who has been sentenced to exile in a prison camp in Jiangzhou after killing Yan Poxi. En route, Song Jiang passes by Jieyang Town (揭陽鎮; believed to be in present-day Jiujiang, Jiangxi), where he unknowingly offends the influential Mu brothers (Mu Hong and Mu Chun), who seek to harm him. In desperation, Song Jiang flees the town and boards Zhang Heng's boat at the riverbank. When the boat reaches the middle of the Xunyang River, Zhang Heng reveals himself as a pirate and wants to rob and kill Song Jiang.

Just then, Li Jun and the Tong brothers, who have met and befriended Song Jiang earlier, show up to stop Zhang Heng. After they introduce Song Jiang to him, Zhang Heng is so shocked to realise that the man he tried to rob is actually the chivalrous and generous man he has long heard of and admires. He immediately apologises to Song Jiang and ferries him back to the riverbank. Li Jun then introduces Song Jiang to the Mu brothers, who are shocked to learn of his identity and apologise to him. They treat Song Jiang as an honoured guest before he leaves with his escorts to continue his journey to Jiangzhou.

== Becoming an outlaw ==
Song Jiang later runs into trouble in Jiangzhou when he writes a seditious poem after getting drunk. He is arrested and sentenced to death, but his outlaw friends from Liangshan Marsh show up in full force, storm the execution ground, and save him.

After fleeing Jiangzhou, the whole lot gets stranded in a temple at the riverbank while government forces close in. At that moment, Zhang Heng, Li Jun, the Tong brothers, and the others whom Song Jiang has met and befriended earlier at Jieyang Town suddenly appear in their boats and ferry everyone to safety. After that, Zhang Heng and the others join the outlaw band at Liangshan Marsh.

== Life in Liangshan ==
During a battle between government forces and the Liangshan outlaws, Zhang Heng is eager to gain the top credit for victory, so he leads a small group to launch a night raid on the enemy camp without informing his fellow outlaws except Ruan Xiaoqi. He ends up falling into an ambush and getting captured by the enemy commander Guan Sheng. He is only freed after Guan Sheng surrenders and joins the outlaws.

== Campaigns and death ==
Zhang Heng is appointed as a commander of the Liangshan navy after the 108 Heroes are fully assembled. He participates in the campaigns against the Liao invaders and rebel forces in Song territory after the outlaws receive amnesty from Emperor Huizong.

During the campaign against Fang La's rebel forces, Zhang Heng's brother Zhang Shun is killed by archers under Fang La's son Fang Tianding while attempting to sneak into Hangzhou by climbing over a sluice gate. During the subsequent battle, Zhang Shun's spirit possesses Zhang Heng and kills Fang Tianding to avenge himself before departing. When Zhang Heng realises his brother is dead, he is so overwhelmed with grief that he becomes critically ill and dies shortly after.
