= Ruan Xiaoqi =

Fictional character in the Chinese classical novel Water Margin

- Water Margin character
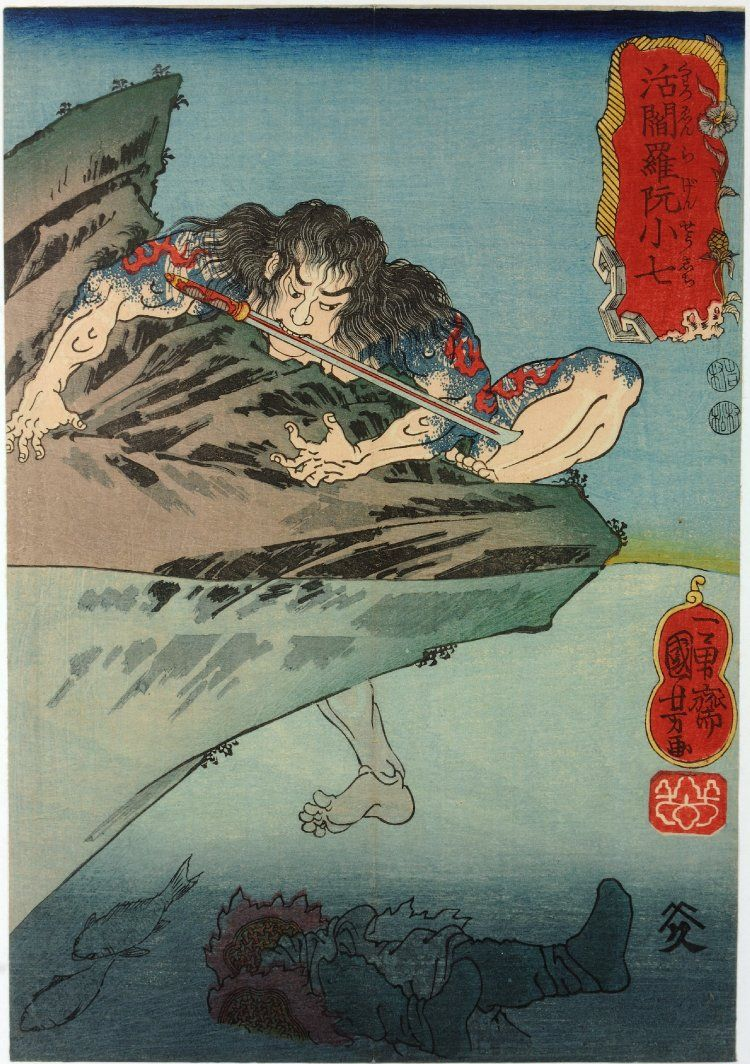
- an illustration of Ruan Xiaoqi by Utagawa Kuniyoshi
- First appearance: Chapter 15

In-universe information
- Nicknames: "Living King Yama" 活閻羅
- Origin: fisherman
- Designation: Naval Commander of Liangshan
- Rank: 31st, Defeat Star (天敗星) of the 36 Heavenly Spirits
- Ancestral home / Place of origin: Shijie Village (in present-day Liangshan County, Shandong)

Chinese names
- Simplified Chinese: 阮小七
- Traditional Chinese: 阮小七
- Pinyin: Ruǎn Xiǎoqī
- Wade–Giles: Juan Hsiao-ch'i

Ruan Xiaoqi, also known as Ruan the Seventh, is a fictional character in Water Margin, one of the Classic Chinese Novels. Nicknamed "Living King Yama", he ranks 31st among the 36 Heavenly Spirits, the first third of the 108 Heroes.

== Background ==
The novel describes Ruan Xiaoqi as a man with bulging eyes, pale yellow whiskers, and dark patches on his skin which make him look like a fearsome bronze statue. As his appearance evokes the popular image of the ruler of Hell in Chinese mythology, he is nicknamed "Living King Yama".

Ruan Xiaoqi has two elder brothers – Ruan Xiao'er and Ruan Xiaowu – whom he lives with in Shijie Village (石碣村; in present-day Liangshan County, Shandong), where they make a living by fishing in the waters around Liangshan Marsh. All three brothers are exceptional swimmers and skilled fighters both on land and in water.

== Robbing the convoy of birthday gifts ==
The Ruan brothers are first introduced in the novel when Wu Yong recommends them to Chao Gai, the headman of Dongxi Village in Yuncheng County, as potential partners in their plan to rob a convoy of valuable birthday gifts for the corrupt official Cai Jing. Wu Yong then travels to Shijie Village to meet the brothers, pretending to buy fish from them while sussing out their receptivity to the idea.

While Ruan Xiao'er is a little more reserved, Ruan Xiaowu and Ruan Xiaoqi are more straightforward and they soon reveal their discontent with living in poverty and under a corrupt government. When Wu Yong eventually reveals the true purpose of his visit, the Ruan brothers readily accept the invitation to join the heist. They form a team of seven – Chao Gai, Wu Yong, Gongsun Sheng, Liu Tang, and the three Ruan brothers – and plan to strike at Yellow Mud Ridge (黃泥崗) on the outskirts of Yuncheng County.

The seven men collaborate with their accomplice Bai Sheng to trick the soldiers escorting the convoy into consuming alcoholic drinks spiked with menghanyao (蒙汗藥), which causes dizziness and unconsciousness. Once the soldiers are out cold, the seven men make off with the valuables.

== Becoming an outlaw ==
The authorities investigate and soon identify Chao Gai as one of the robbers, despatching soldiers to Dongxi Village to arrest him and his companions. The seven men flee to Shijie Village and hide in the marshes. There, the Ruan brothers, taking advantage of their familiarity with the waterways, lure the unwary soldiers into ambushes and wipe them out.

After that, the seven men seek refuge in the outlaw stronghold at Liangshan Marsh. Chao Gai eventually becomes the outlaw band's chief, with Ruan Xiaoqi taking the eighth position of leadership.

== Life at Liangshan ==
During his time in Liangshan, Ruan Xiaoqi puts his skills to good use in the battles between the outlaws and government forces.

On one occasion, when the artillery officer Ling Zhen bombards Liangshan with cannon fire, the Ruan brothers swim towards the riverside artillery platform undetected, and sabotage the cannons. An infuriated Ling Zhen pursues them into the marshes, where he is ambushed and captured, and ultimately decides to surrender and join the outlaws.

When Guan Sheng leads government forces to Liangshan, Zhang Heng attempts to raid the enemy camp but ends up falling into a trap and getting captured. Ruan Xiaoqi attempts to save him but gets taken captive too. Both are freed after Guan Sheng surrenders and joins the outlaws.

== Campaigns ==
Ruan Xiaoqi is appointed as a commander of the Liangshan navy after the 108 Heroes are fully assembled. He participates in campaigns against the Liao invaders and rebel forces in Song territory after the outlaws receive amnesty from Emperor Huizong.

During the final campaign against Fang La's rebel forces, Ruan Xiaoqi's two brothers are killed in battle. After the Liangshan forces emerge victorious, Ruan Xiaoqi finds Fang La's crown and robe, and puts them on out of mischief. His actions constitute lèse-majesté since Fang La had declared himself emperor to challenge Emperor Huizong's mandate to rule.

Ruan Xiaoqi accompanies the surviving Liangshan heroes as they return to the capital to report their victory to the emperor, who rewards each of them in turn for their contributions during the campaigns.

When it is Ruan Xiaoqi's turn, the corrupt officials Cai Jing and Gao Qiu step up and voice their objections, pointing out that Ruan should be punished for committing lèse-majesté. However, the emperor pardons Ruan Xiaoqi on account of his contributions, and gives him no reward.

== Later life and death ==
Ruan Xiaoqi returns to Shijie Village, where he lives happily to the age of 70.

In the Peking opera The Fisherman's Revenge (Dayu shajia; also known as Demanding the Fishing Tax), which is part of The Qing Ding Pearl routine, Ruan Xiaoqi moves to the region of Lake Tai after retiring and adopts the name Xiao En (蕭恩) to prevent his enemies from tracking him down. He and his daughter get involved in a conflict against a local gang; the father-daughter duo kill the gang leader and return to their low-profile lives.
