= The Qing Ding Pearl =

Chinese play

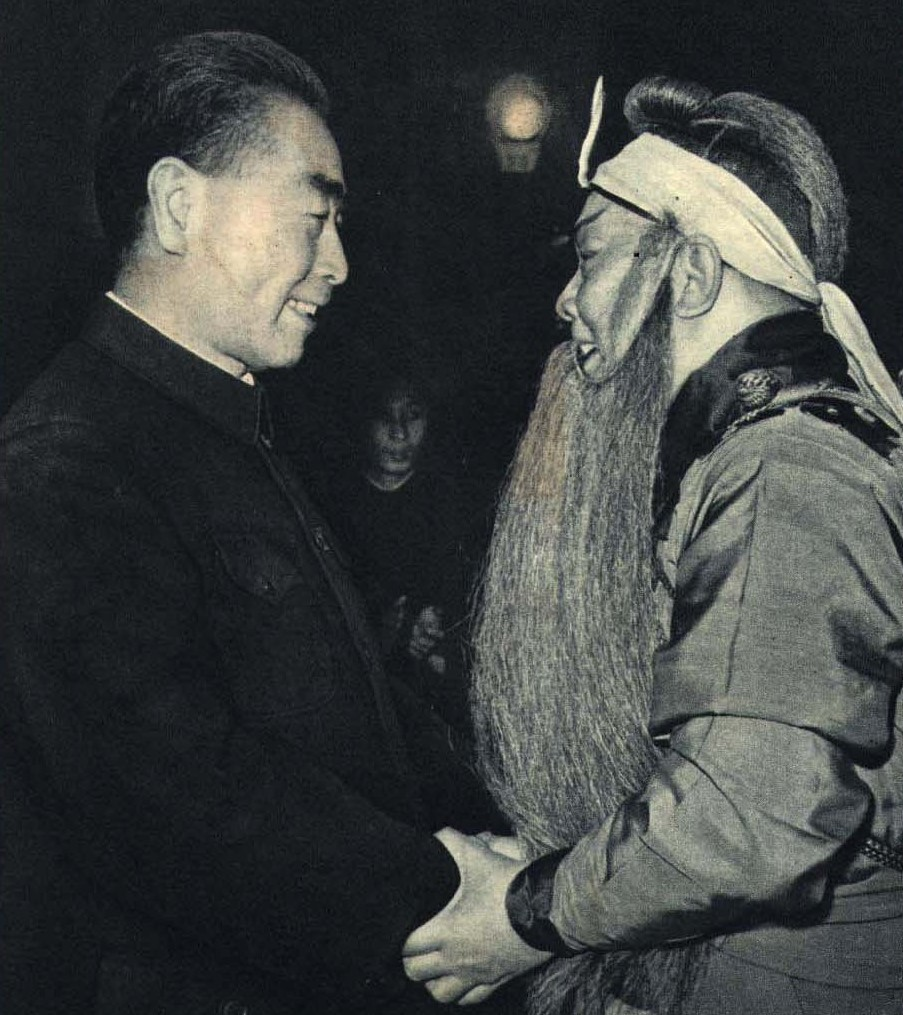
Zhou Enlai (left) shaking hands with Zhou Xinfang (right) after watching his A Fisherman Kills a Family.

A printed copy of the play The Qing Ding Pearl

The Qing Ding Pearl (simplified Chinese: 庆顶珠; traditional Chinese: 慶頂珠) is a Chinese play. It dates to the Song dynasty and is still performed in adapted forms in the Beijing Opera.

The play is known by other titles: Two sections (折 zhe) of the main play are sometimes performed separately as The Fisherman's Revenge 漁夫恨 or A Fisherman Kills a Family (打渔杀家; 打漁殺家; dayu sha jia) also Collecting the Fishing Tax (討漁稅; taoyushui).

== Plot ==
The play tells the story of Xiao En (whose real identity is Ruan Xiaoqi from Water Margin), a poor fisherman and his daughter who seeks bloody revenge after their livelihoods are taxed away by the overbearing Squire Ding. Squire Ding sends tax collectors and boxers to Xiao's fishing vessel but the fisherman refuses because the tax is illegal and the river had run dry. Therefore, there is no fish for him to be taxed on. Two swashbucklers named Li Jun and Ni Rong help Xiao En. The now bloodied Boxers escape and report to Squire Ding. For his transgression, Xiao is whipped. Angered, he and his daughter go to Squire Ding's residence – The Ding Mansion. They sneak in, his daughter wearing the Qing Ding Pearl to masquerade as a noble. Inside, the pair slays everyone inside.

== Music ==
The play is a xipi (西皮; "western skins") play.

== History ==
The twentieth-century Chinese actor Mei Lanfang frequently performed the role of the fisherman's daughter to great acclaim.
