= Xunyang =

Xunyang may refer to:

- Xunyang, Shaanxi (旬阳市), a county-level city in Ankang, Shaanxi, China
- Xunyang District (浔阳区), a district in Jiujiang, Jiangxi, China, and former name of Jiangxi itself
- Xunyang River (浔阳江), section of Yangtze River north of Jiujiang, Jiangxi, China
