= Li Jun (Water Margin) =

Fictional character in the Chinese classical novel Water Margin

- Water Margin character
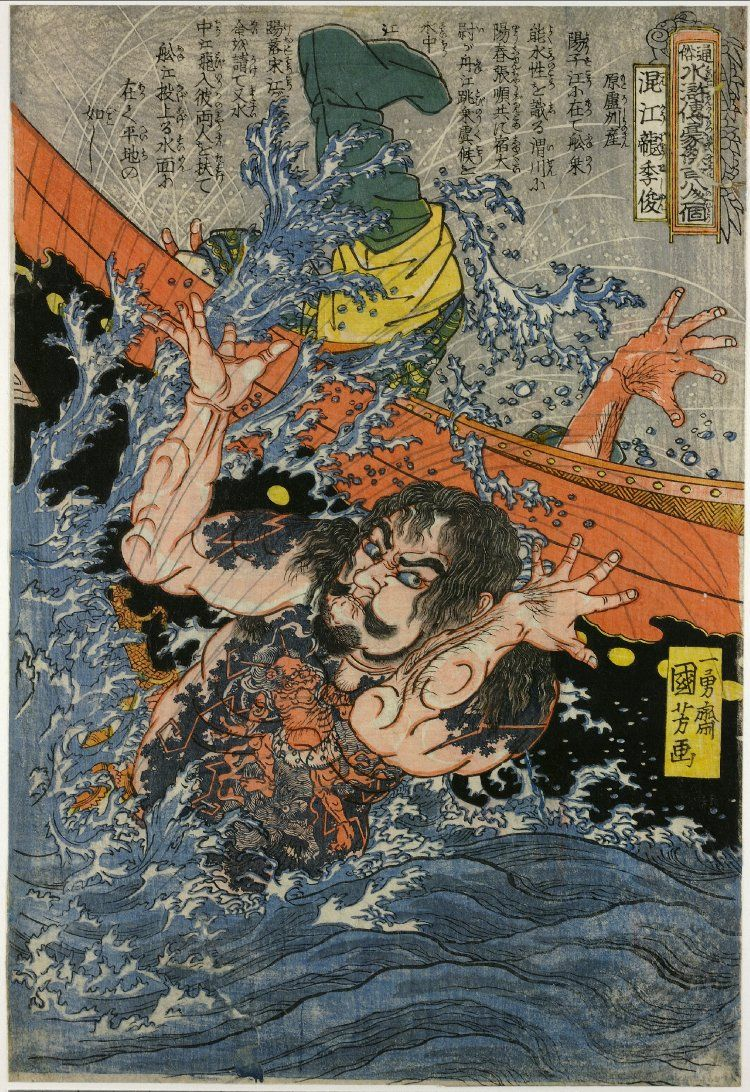
- an illustration of Li Jun by Utagawa Kuniyoshi
- First appearance: Chapter 36

In-universe information
- Nicknames: "River Dragon" (混江龍)
- Weapon: sword
- Origin: salt smuggler
- Designation: Naval Commander of Liangshan
- Rank: 26th, Longevity Star (天壽星) of the 36 Heavenly Spirits
- Ancestral home / Place of origin: Luzhou (present-day Hefei, Anhui)

Chinese names
- Simplified Chinese: 李俊
- Traditional Chinese: 李俊
- Pinyin: Lǐ Jùn
- Wade–Giles: Li Chün

Li Jun is a fictional character in Water Margin, one of the Classic Chinese Novels. Nicknamed "River Dragon", he ranks 26th among the 36 Heavenly Spirits, the first third of the 108 Heroes.

== Background ==
The novel describes Li Jun as an eight chi-tall man with thick eyebrows, large eyes, a reddish face, wire-like whiskers, and a booming voice. Originally from Luzhou (蘆州; present-day Hefei, Anhui), he has since moved to Jieyang Ridge (揭陽嶺; believed to be in present-day Jiujiang, Jiangxi) with his close friend, Li Li. A highly-skilled fighter both on land and in water, he is better known for being an excellent swimmer, which earns him the nickname "River Dragon".

Li Jun runs a salt smuggling operation on the Xunyang River with his sidekicks, the brothers Tong Wei and Tong Meng, while Li Li opens a tavern on Jieyang Ridge, where he drugs, robs and murders unsuspecting customers.

== Meeting Song Jiang ==
Li Jun first meets Song Jiang when the latter passes by Jieyang Ridge on his way to Jiangzhou (江州; present-day Jiujiang, Jiangxi), where he has been exiled to for killing Yan Poxi. While taking a rest in Li Li's tavern, he and his two escorts unsuspectingly consume drinks spiked with menghanyao (蒙汗藥), a drug which causes dizziness and unconsciousness.

Li Jun and the Tong brothers, who have long heard of Song Jiang's reputation for his chivalry and generosity, have been hoping to meet him at the riverbank. When they learn that Li Li has drugged an exile, they head to the tavern and find an official document on the escorts confirming Song Jiang's identity. They then get Li Li to revive Song Jiang and apologise to him, after which they introduce themselves to Song and treat him hospitably before seeing him off.

Song Jiang passes by the nearby Jieyang Town later and unknowingly offends the brothers Mu Hong and Mu Chun, who seek to harm him. While fleeing, Song Jiang desperately boards a boat operated by Zhang Heng. When the boat reaches the middle of the Xunyang River, Zhang Heng reveals himself as a pirate and wants to rob and kill Song Jiang.

Just then, Li Jun and the Tong brothers show up to stop Zhang Heng, and introduce Song Jiang to him. Zhang Heng, upon realising the man he tried to rob is the chivalrous man he has long admired, immediately apologises and ferries him back to Jieyang Town. Li Jun then introduces Song Jiang to the Mu brothers, who are shocked to learn of his identity and apologise to him. They treat Song Jiang as an honoured guest before he leaves with his escorts to continue his journey to Jiangzhou.

== Becoming an outlaw ==
Song Jiang later runs into trouble in Jiangzhou when he writes a seditious poem after getting drunk. He is arrested and sentenced to death, but his outlaw friends from Liangshan Marsh show up in full force, storm the execution ground, and save him.

After fleeing Jiangzhou, the whole lot gets stranded in a temple at the riverbank while government forces close in. At that moment, Li Jun, Li Li, the Tong brothers, and the others whom Song Jiang has met and befriended earlier at Jieyang Ridge suddenly appear in their boats and ferry everyone to safety. After that, Li Jun and the others join the outlaw band at Liangshan Marsh.

== Campaigns ==
Li Jun is appointed as a commander of the Liangshan navy after the 108 Heroes are fully assembled. He participates in the campaigns against the Liao invaders and rebel forces in Song territory after the outlaws receive amnesty from Emperor Huizong.

During the campaign against Tian Hu's rebel forces, Li Jun proposes flooding Taiyuan to trap the rebels. His idea turns out to be instrumental to the Liangshan victory over Tian Hu. In the final campaign against Fang La's rebel forces, Li Jun makes great contributions in battle by leading Liangshan marines to sink enemy ships during the battle of Lake Tai, and infiltrating Suzhou to sabotage its defences. At the last battle in Qingxi County (清溪縣; present-day Chun'an County, Zhejiang), he pretends to defect to Fang La's side and carries out a successful subterfuge mission that leads to Fang La's capture.

== Later life ==
The final campaign against Fang La costs the lives of nearly two-thirds of the 108 Heroes; Li Jun is one of the few survivors. Unwilling to continue serving the corrupt Song government, Li Jun feigns illness while the survivors are en route to the Song capital to report their victory, and remains in Suzhou. The Tong brothers also stay behind to take care of him.

In legend, Li Jun, the Tong brothers, and the friends they made at Lake Tai later travel to Taicang, from which they set sail into the open sea. They eventually arrive and settle in Siam, where Li Jun becomes the king while his companions serve as his subjects.

== See also ==
- List of Water Margin minor characters#Li Jun's story for a list of supporting minor characters from Li Jun's story.
