= Tong Meng =

Tong Meng or Tongmeng may refer to:

- Tong Meng (Water Margin) (童猛), fictional character in the Water Margin
- Tongmenghui (同盟會), a Chinese resistance movement in the late Qing Dynasty
- Tongmeng (town) (铜盂镇), town in Chaoyang District, Shantou, Guangdong, China
