= Shi Qian =

Fictional character in the Chinese classical novel Water Margin

- Water Margin character
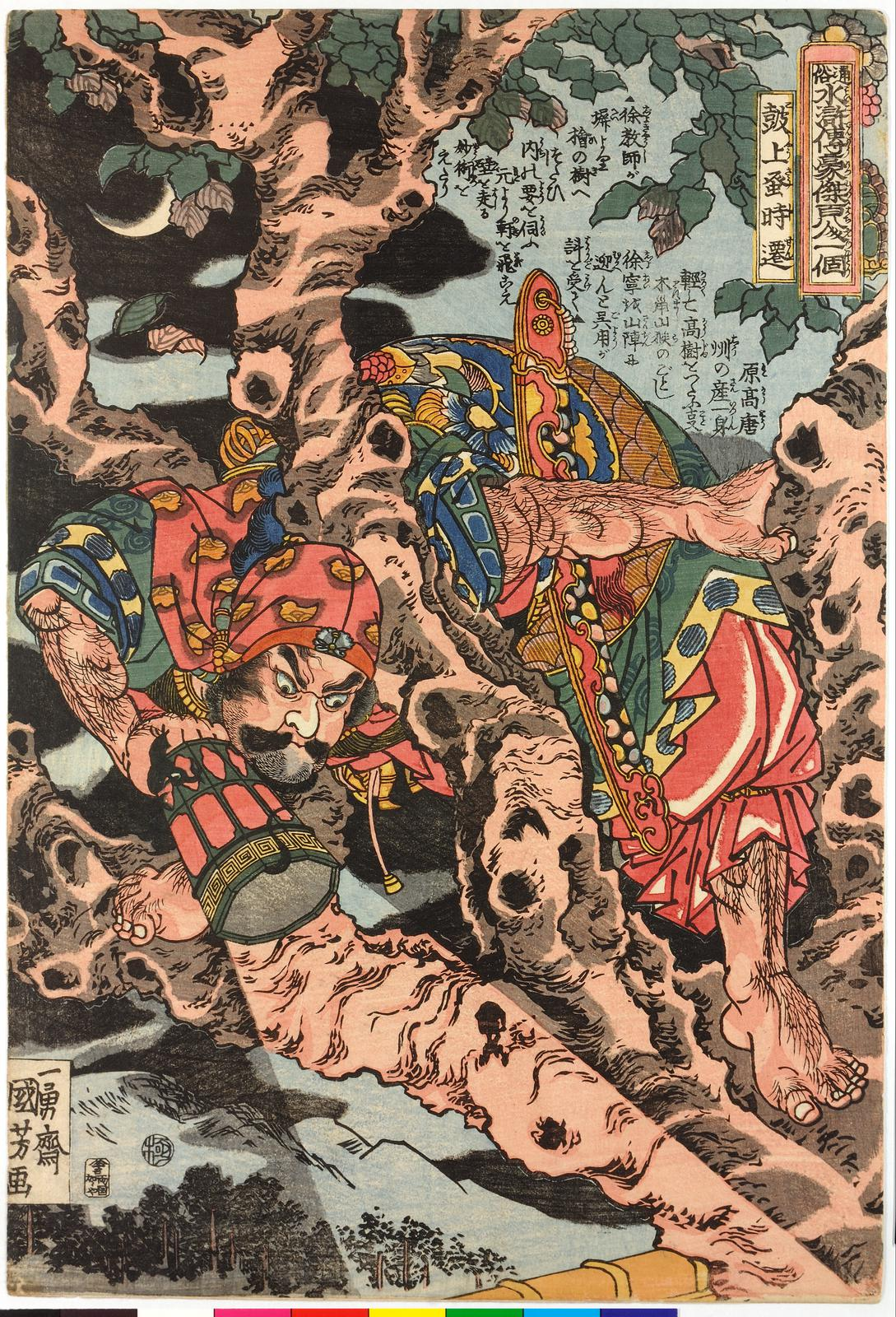
- an illustration of Shi Qian by Utagawa Kuniyoshi
- First appearance: Chapter 46

In-universe information
- Nicknames: "Flea on a Drum" 鼓上蚤
- Weapon: podao
- Origin: thief, tomb raider
- Designation: Infantry Commander of Liangshan
- Rank: 107th, Thief Star (地賊星) of the 72 Earthly Fiends
- Ancestral home / Place of origin: Gaotangzhou (present-day Gaotang County, Shandong)

Chinese names
- Simplified Chinese: 时迁
- Traditional Chinese: 時遷
- Pinyin: Shí Qiān
- Wade–Giles: Shih Ch'ien

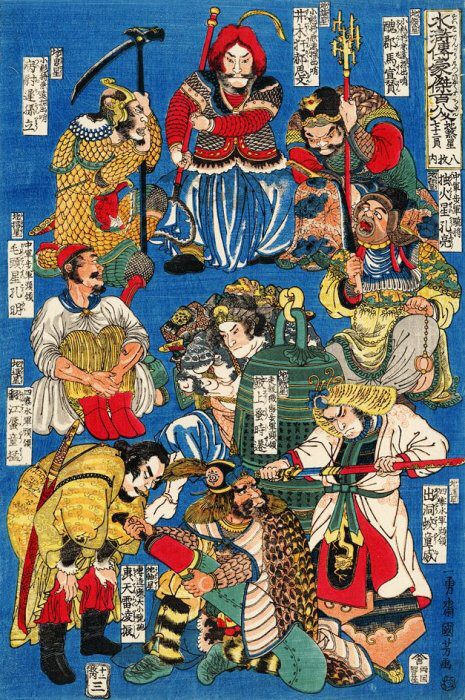
An illustration of nine of the 108 Heroes by Utagawa Kuniyoshi. Clockwise from top: Hao Siwen, Xuan Zan, Kong Liang, Shi Qian, Tong Wei, Ling Zhen, Tong Meng, Kong Ming, and Sun Li.

Shi Qian is a fictional character in Water Margin, one of the Classic Chinese Novels. Nicknamed "Flea on a Drum", he ranks 107th among the 108 Heroes and 71st among the 72 Earthly Fiends.

== Background ==
The novel describes Shi Qian as a man with thick eyebrows, bright eyes, and an agile and slim build. He is known for his thieving skills and ability to easily scale walls and move on rooftops, hence he is nicknamed "Flea on a Drum". Originally from Gaotangzhou (高唐州; present-day Gaotang County, Shandong), he has moved to Jizhou (蓟州; present-day Jizhou, Tianjin), where he burgles the homes of affluent families and raids the tombs of the wealthy. There, he once ran into trouble with the authorities and was thrown into prison. However, he was saved by Yang Xiong, a jailer and executioner who secretly released him.

== Becoming an outlaw ==
One day, after robbing graves on Cuiping Hill (翠屏山; southeast of present-day Jizhou, Tianjin), Shi Qian secretly witnesses Yang Xiong killing his unfaithful wife, Pan Qiaoyun, and overhears Yang discussing with Shi Xiu about joining the outlaw band at Liangshan Marsh. Revealing himself to them, he asks them to take him along and threatens to report the murder if they refuse. They gladly agree and stop at a tavern for a break on their way to Liangshan.

During this time, Shi Qian steals a rooster from the tavern and cooks it for their meal since the place does not serve any palatable food. A fight breaks out when the tavern owner, after accusing Shi Qian of theft, calls for help upon hearing Shi Xiu claim that the three of them are from Liangshan. Unknown to the three men, the tavern is under the protection of the Zhu Family Village, a fortified village run by three brothers and their father who are very hostile towards the Liangshan outlaws. The three men burn down the tavern and flee, with dozens of armed men from the village in pursuit. Shi Qian accidentally stumbles into a trap and gets captured.

Yang Xiong and Shi Xiu escape and take shelter in the nearby Li Family Village, whose master Li Ying is sympathetic towards them. Li Ying then writes to the Zhus, apologising on behalf of the three men for the disturbance, and kindly requesting that the Zhus give him face by freeing Shi Qian. The situation escalates into violence when the Zhus not only turn down Li Ying's request, but also insult him, prompting Li to confront them. Zhu Biao, the youngest of the Zhu brothers, injures Li Ying with an arrow shot, forcing him to retreat. Left with no other option, Yang Xiong and Shi Xiu make their way to Liangshan Marsh to seek help.

The Liangshan outlaws, having heard of the Zhus' insults and taunts directed at them, assemble their forces to attack the Zhu Family Village to achieve the twin objectives of rescuing Shi Qian and teaching the arrogant Zhus a lesson. After three assaults, the outlaws defeat the Zhus and overrun the village, saving Shi Qian and their comrades captured by the Zhus. Shi Qian then officially joins the Liangshan outlaws.

== Life at Liangshan ==
During his time in Liangshan, Shi Qian makes various contributions to the outlaw band. The most notable one is when he participates in the outlaws' mission to recruit Xu Ning, a martial arts instructor in Dongjing (東京; present-day Kaifeng, Henan). Along with Xu Ning's cousin Tang Long and others, Shi Qian travels to Dongjing, sneaks into Xu Ning's residence at night, and steals his family heirloom – a golden armoured vest impervious to sharp weapons. Shi Qian then lures Xu Ning to chase him over the next few days, while Tang Long, pretending to accompany his cousin to retrieve the vest, subtly leads him closer and closer to Liangshan. Xu Ning unsuspectingly consumes a drink spiked with menghanyao (蒙汗藥), which induces dizziness and unconsciousness, and gets taken to Liangshan while he is out cold. Meanwhile, his family members in Dongjing have already been fetched to Liangshan. When Xu Ning comes to, Shi Qian returns him the vest while the other outlaws reveal what has happened and managed to convince Xu to join the outlaw band. Xu Ning then trains the Liangshan infantry in using the hooked lance, which is instrumental to the outlaws' subsequent victory over a chain-linked armoured cavalry formation deployed by government forces under Huyan Zhuo.

Shi Qian also plays a key role in rescuing Lu Junyi and Shi Xiu when they are imprisoned in Daming Prefecture (大名府; present-day Daming County, Hebei). The Liangshan outlaws, including Shi Qian, infiltrate the city during the Lantern Festival for the rescue mission. Shi Qian is assigned to set fire to a prominent tower as a signal for the outlaws to simultaneously strike in different parts of the city, throwing the government forces into chaos and confusion while the outlaws seize the chance to save their captured comrades.

== Campaigns and death ==
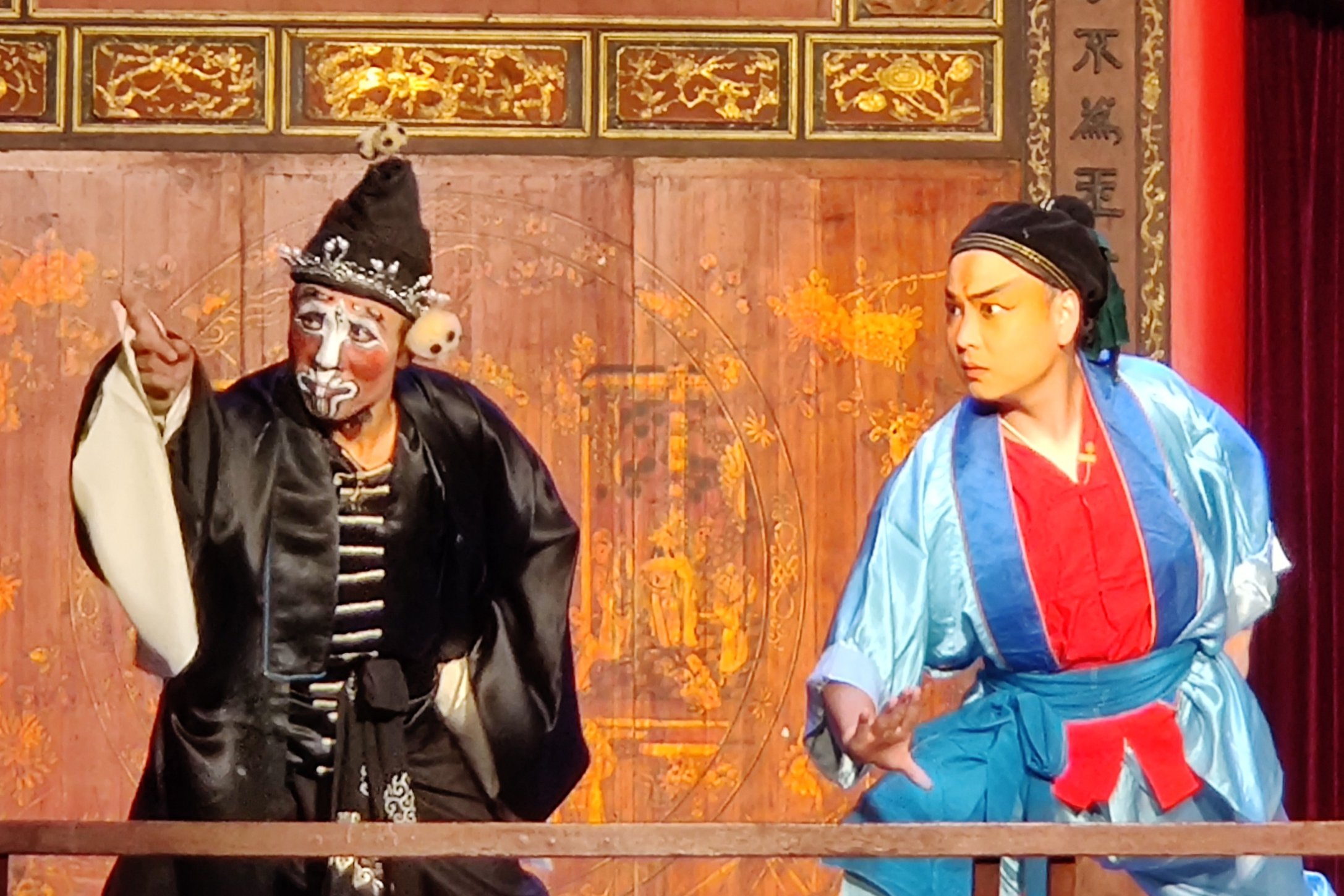
Shi Qian (left) as portrayed by Jiao Yanming in the Peking opera "Robbing the Royal Tomb" (盜王墳).

Shi Qian is appointed as a commander of the Liangshan infantry after the 108 Heroes are fully assembled. His task is to deliver intelligence reports to and fro the frontline.

After Emperor Huizong grants amnesty to the Liangshan outlaws, Shi Qian joins them in the campaigns against the Liao invaders and rebel forces in Song territory.

Shi Qian is one of the few survivors of the final campaign against Fang La's rebel forces, which costs the lives of nearly two-thirds of the 108 Heroes. However, he dies of an intestinal disease shortly after the victory. The emperor awards him the posthumous title "Righteous Gentleman of Integrity" (義節郎) to honour him for his contributions during the campaigns.
