= Ling Zhen =

Fictional character in the Chinese classical novel Water Margin

- Water Margin character
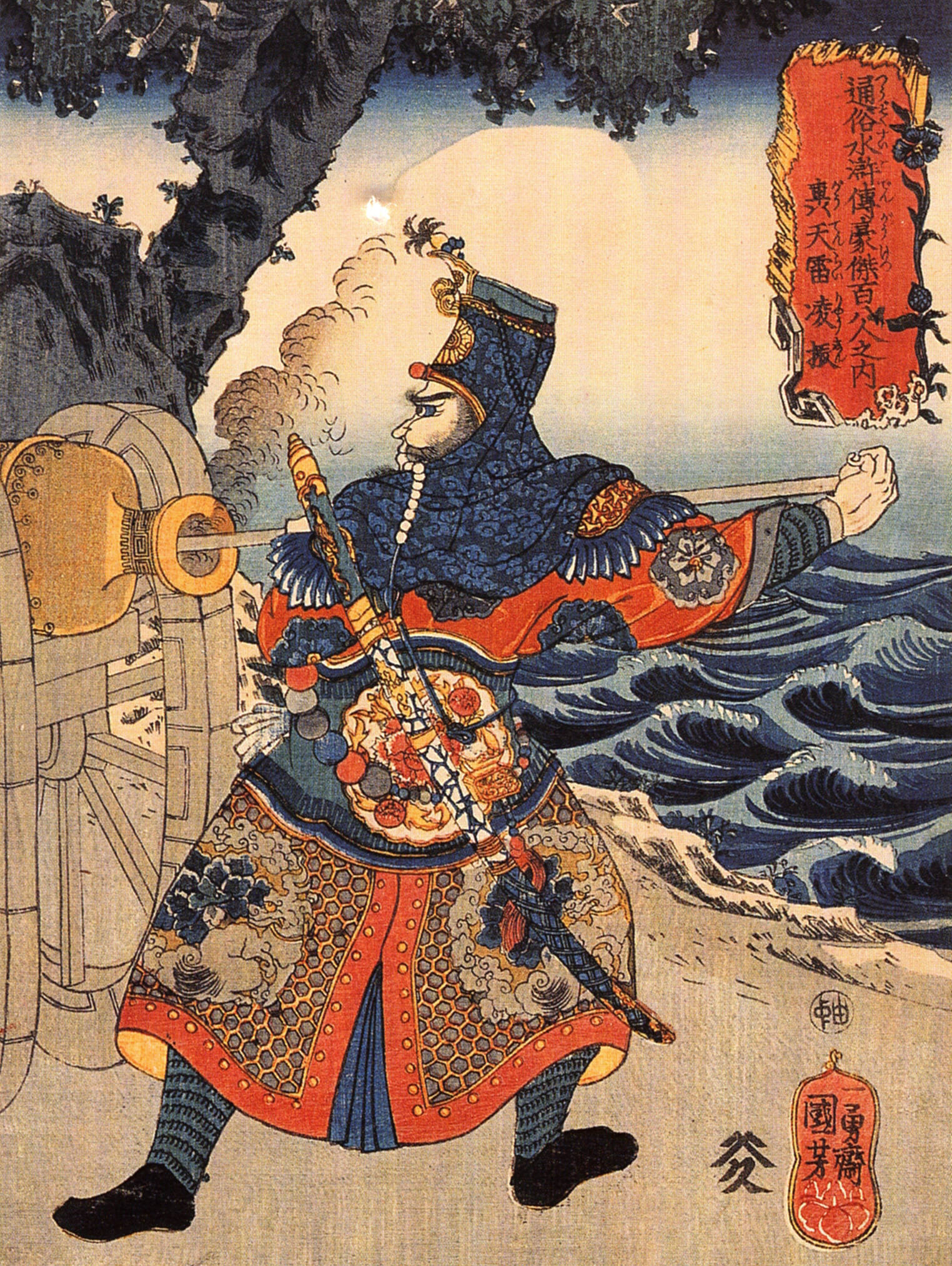
- an illustration of Ling Zhen by Utagawa Kuniyoshi
- First appearance: Chapter 55

In-universe information
- Nicknames: "Heaven-shaking Thunder" 轟天雷
- Origin: military officer
- Designation: Artillery Commander of Liangshan
- Rank: 52nd, Axis Star (地軸星) of the 72 Earthly Fiends
- Ancestral home / Place of origin: Yanling (present-day Yanling County, Henan)

Chinese names
- Simplified Chinese: 凌振
- Traditional Chinese: 凌振
- Pinyin: Líng Zhèn
- Wade–Giles: Ling Chen

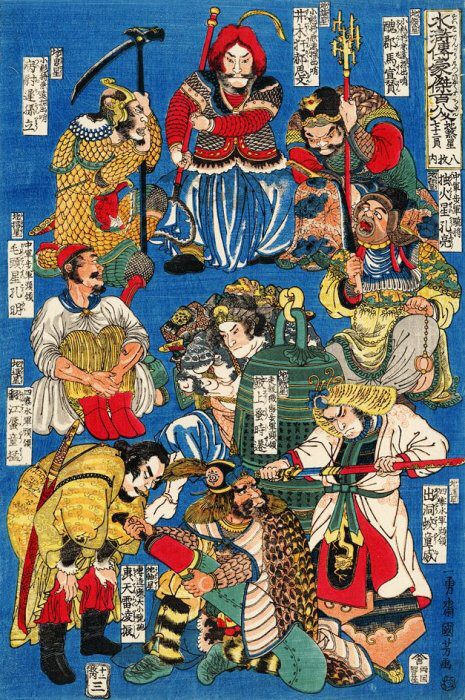
An illustration of nine of the 108 Heroes by Utagawa Kuniyoshi. Clockwise from top: Hao Siwen, Xuan Zan, Kong Liang, Shi Qian, Tong Wei, Ling Zhen, Tong Meng, Kong Ming, and Sun Li.

Ling Zhen is a fictional character in Water Margin, one of the Classic Chinese Novels. Nicknamed "Heaven-shaking Thunder", he ranks 52nd among the 108 Heroes and 16th among the 72 Earthly Fiends.

== Background ==
Originally from Yanling (燕陵; present-day Yanling County, Henan), Ling Zhen is a highly-skilled warrior and archer serving as a military officer in the capital Dongjing (東京; present-day Kaifeng, Henan). He is best known for his expertise in gunpowder weapons – particularly cannons – hence he is nicknamed "Heaven-shaking Thunder".

== Becoming an outlaw ==
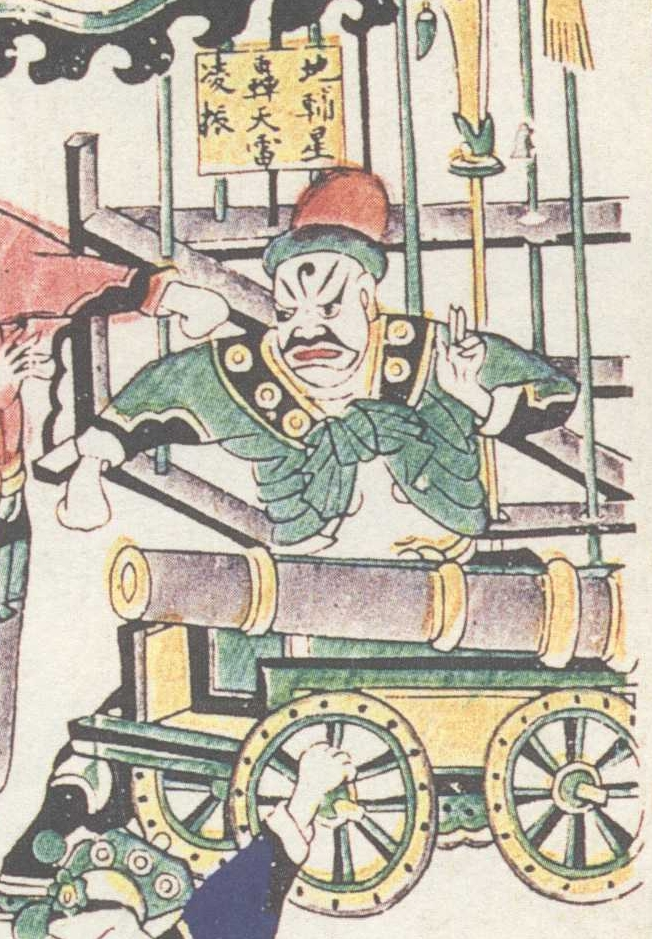
A Qing dynasty illustration of Ling Zhen

Ling Zhen is first introduced in the novel when he is summoned to provide artillery support to the government forces led by Huyan Zhuo, who has been tasked with destroying the outlaws at Liangshan Marsh.

At Huyan Zhuo's direction, Ling Zhen bombards the outlaw stronghold with cannon fire on a platform near the riverbank. In retaliation, Liangshan marines approach the platform undetected by swimming underwater, and sabotage the cannons. Furious, Ling Zhen attempts to pursue the enemy but loses his way in the marshes and ends up being taken captive. The outlaws treat him respectfully and manage to convince him to surrender and join their cause of "upholding justice on Heaven's behalf".

After losing artillery support, Huyan Zhuo deploys his special cavalry comprising groups of heavily armoured horsemen connected by chains. The combined might of the horsemen charging forward overwhelms the Liangshan forces.

The outlaws eventually recruit Xu Ning, who trains their infantry in using the hooked lance, targeting the armoured cavalry's weak point: the horses' legs. Ling Zhen, now on Liangshan's side, provides artillery support, scaring the horses with cannon fire during the battle.

In the end, the outlaws defeat Huyan Zhuo and completely destroy his chain-linked armoured cavalry. Huyan Zhuo himself is ultimately captured by the outlaws and agrees to surrender and join them too.

== Campaigns ==
Ling Zhen is appointed as the artillery commander at Liangshan after the 108 Heroes are fully assembled. He participates in the campaigns against the Liao invaders and rebel forces in Song territory after the outlaws receive amnesty from Emperor Huizong.

During the final campaign against Fang La's rebel forces, Ling Zhen is often called upon to bombard enemy fortifications with cannon fire to create chaos before the Liangshan forces stage their assaults.

Ling Zhen is one of the few Liangshan heroes who survive all the campaigns. To honour him for his contributions, the emperor reinstates him as a military officer.
