= Cai Jing =

Chinese Song dynasty calligrapher and politician (1047-1126)

- Traditional Chinese: 蔡京
- Simplified Chinese: 蔡京
Transcriptions
Standard Mandarin
- Hanyu Pinyin: Cài Jīng
- Wade–Giles: Tsai Ching

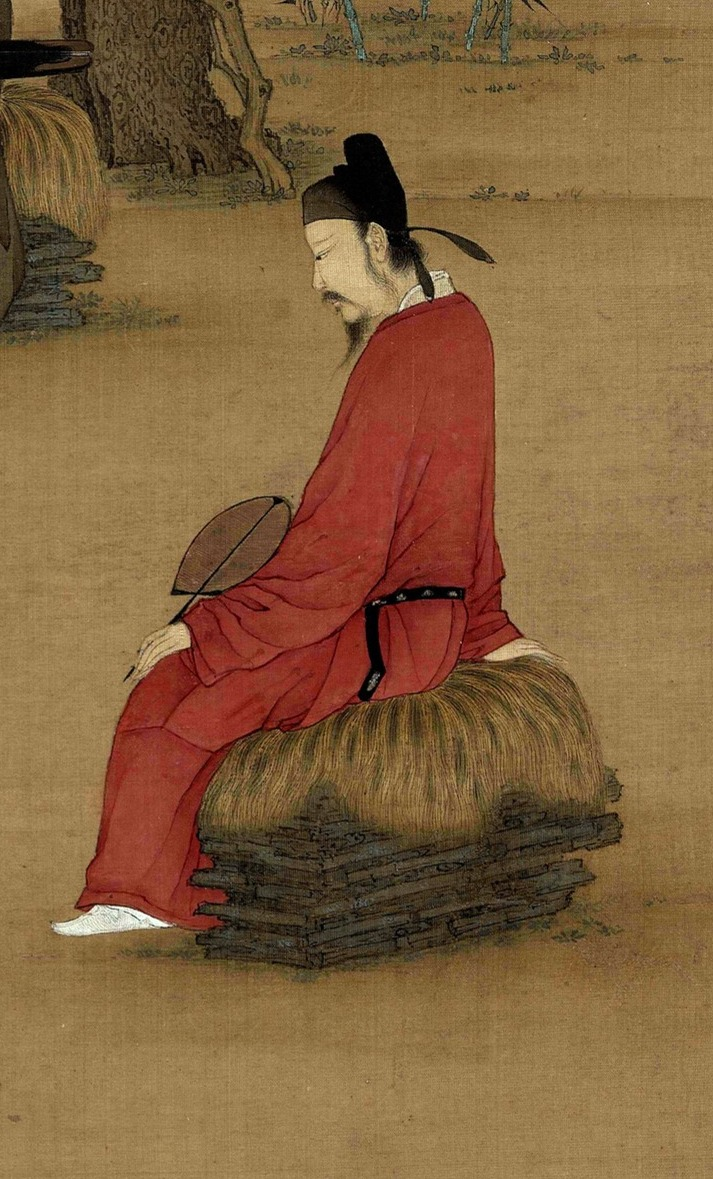
Cai Jing

Cai Jing (1047–1126), courtesy name Yuanchang (元長), was a Chinese calligrapher and politician of the Northern Song dynasty of China, serving as chancellor four times. He is also fictionalised as one of the primary antagonists in Water Margin, one of the Four Great Classical Novels of Chinese literature.

== Life ==
Cai Jing was from Xianyou, Xinghua (present-day Putian, Fujian). In 1070, he participated in the imperial examination and got a jinshi degree (a successful candidate). He served as a civil official in Qiantang before moving on to work in the Grand Secretary's office.

In 1086, Cai Jing was posted to the administrative office in Kaifeng, the capital. He supported the conservative faction in the imperial court, headed by Sima Guang, and won the praise of Sima. In 1094, Cai Jing became the Minister for Revenue. He helped Zhang Dun (章惇) revive the New Policies of reformist chancellor Wang Anshi, although he set out on a campaign of attrition to destroy or radically alter the written work of his predecessors and especially conservative enemies, thereby probably also purging much of Shen Kuo's written work.

During the reign of Emperor Huizong, Cai Jing was impeached and ordered to retire in Hangzhou. Cai Jing collaborated with the eunuch-general Tong Guan to win back his place in the imperial court. After rising to prominence in politics and becoming chancellor at one point, Cai Jing introduced the policy of huashigang (花石綱), for officials to focus on offering precious gifts and tributes to the emperor. In 1102 and 1113, he introduced reforms to the taxation laws on tea and salt trading, as well as increasing human labour. Cai Jing's policies were unpopular among the common people and led to corruption in the government.

Cai Jing and Tong Guan were two of the officials Emperor Huizong asked in 1115 to evaluate the proposal that the Song ally themselves with the Jurchen against the Liao. Huizong was not interested at first, and continued "to get mixed reports from his officials... [In 1118], Tong Guan, in a memorial that has not been preserved, proposed taking advantage of the disorder in Liao to reclaim Sixteen Prefectures of Yan and Yun [two former Tang territories].... Huizong wanted Cai Jing's opinion of Tong Guan's proposal and several times sent a eunuch to ask Cai Jing what he thought of it. It was not until Huizong kept Cai Jing after an audience and asked him directly, however that Cai Jing was willing to express his opinion. He told Huizong that he did not have confidence in Tong Guan." Despite other warnings, Huizong disregarded Cai Jing's concerns. "Not long afterwards, in 1120/6, Cai Jing retired, quite possibly because Huizong was tired of his resistance to the new alliance [between the Song and the Jurchen-led Jin, who later betrayed their Song allies]."

In 1125, Imperial Academy official Chen Dong submitted a report to Emperor Huizong, denouncing six "traitors" in the imperial court, deemed responsible for the government's decline. The six were Cai Jing, Wang Fu (王黼), Tong Guan (童貫), Zhu Mian (朱勔), Li Yan (李彥), and Liang Shicheng (梁師成), with Cai as the group's leader. Cai Jing was stripped of his official post and banished to Lingnan (present-day Guangdong) after Emperor Qinzong ascended to the throne. Song Scholar Ebrey devotes an appendix in her biography of Huizong reporting how it "is not uncommon to find modern historians who portray Cai Jing as a strong supporter of the alliance" and hence a traitor. She concludes, however, that this was untrue and was actually the result of An Yaochen's 1118 memorial directed against Tong Guan and Cai Jing. Later, "Huizong told the eunuch Liang Shicheng that Cai Jing was the only one who consistently had argued against the northern campaign." Cai Jing starved to death along the journey at Tanzhou (present-day Changsha, Hunan) "as merchants reportedly refused to sell him food. Ill and over eighty, he died within ten days on his way to his site of banishment. On the same day, it was ruled that no future amnesties would lighten the exiles of twenty-three of [his] sons and grandsons [who had also been banished]."

== See also ==
- List of Water Margin characters
- Alliance Conducted at Sea, the alliance between Jin and Northern Song
