= Huyan Zhuo =

Fictional character in the Chinese classical novel Water Margin

- Water Margin character
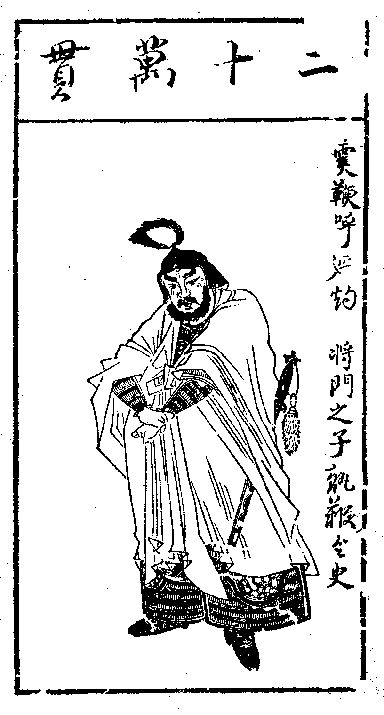
- an illustration of Huyan Zhuo by Chen Hongshou
- First appearance: Chapter 54

In-universe information
- Nicknames: "Double Clubs" 雙鞭
- Weapon: a pair of steel clubs
- Origin: military officer
- Designation: Rear General of the Five Tiger Generals of Liangshan
- Rank: 8th, Force Star (天威星) of the 36 Heavenly Spirits
- Ancestral home / Place of origin: Taiyuan, Shanxi

Chinese names
- Simplified Chinese: 呼延灼
- Traditional Chinese: 呼延灼
- Pinyin: Hūyán Zhuó
- Wade–Giles: Hu-yen Cho

Huyan Zhuo is a fictional character in Water Margin, one of the Classic Chinese Novels. Nicknamed "Double Clubs", he ranked eighth among the 36 Heavenly Spirits, the first third of the 108 Heroes.

== Background ==
Huyan Zhuo is a descendant of Huyan Zan, a 10th-century Song dynasty general. Like his ancestor, Huyan Zhuo serves as a Song military officer in Runing Commandery (汝寧郡: around present-day Runan County, Henan). He wields a pair of heavy steel clubs, which earn him the nickname "Double Clubs".

== Battles against Liangshan ==
Huyan Zhuo is first introduced in the novel when the Song imperial government is discussing how to deal with the outlaws at Liangshan Marsh after they attacked and captured Gaotangzhou (高唐州; present-day Gaotang County, Shandong) and killed its corrupt governor Gao Lian. Huyan Zhuo is recommended to Emperor Huizong to lead government forces to destroy the outlaws, and summoned from Runing Commandery to the imperial capital Dongjing (東京; present-day Kaifeng, Henan). The emperor is impressed with Huyan Zhuo after seeing him in person and hearing of his lineage, so he gifts Huyan Zhuo a black stallion called tixue wuzhui (踢雪烏騅). Huyan Zhuo is then put in charge of the mission of eliminating the Liangshan outlaws, with Han Tao and Peng Qi serving as his deputies.

In their first battle against Liangshan, Peng Qi is captured by Hu Sanniang and ends up joining the outlaws. Huyan Zhuo then deploys his special cavalry comprising groups of heavily armoured horsemen connected by chains. The combined might of the horsemen charging forward overwhelms the Liangshan forces. When the outlaws retreat to their stronghold in the marshes, Huyan Zhuo requests artillery support, so the emperor sends Ling Zhen to lead a battery to bombard Liangshan with cannon fire. The outlaws find an opportunity to sabotage the cannons and lure Ling Zhen into a trap, where he gets captured and ends up joining the outlaws too.

Tang Long, one of the outlaws, suggests to Liangshan's commander Song Jiang to recruit his cousin Xu Ning, a spear/lance instructor in Dongjing, to counter Huyan Zhuo's cavalry. Xu Ning is tricked into coming to Liangshan and reluctantly joins the outlaws, after which he trains the Liangshan infantry in using the hooked lance, targeting the armoured cavalry's weak point: the horses' legs.

Xu Ning's method works out and the Liangshan outlaws defeat Huyan Zhuo, completely destroying his chain-linked armoured cavalry. Han Tao gets captured during the battle and ends up joining the outlaws as well.

== Battle of Qingzhou ==
Huyan Zhuo retreats to Qingzhou alone after his defeat, hoping to redeem himself under the governor, Murong Yanda. En route, his black stallion is stolen by the outlaws from Mount Peach Blossom. After reaching Qingzhou, he receives support from Murong Yanda, who puts in command of troops to attack not only the outlaws on Mount Peach Blossom, but also the outlaw bands at Mount White Tiger and Mount Twin Dragons.

Unable to resist Huyan Zhuo's attacks, the outlaws from the three mountains turn to their fellow outlaws at Liangshan Marsh for help. This time, Huyan Zhuo is lured into an ambush by the Liangshan outlaws and ends up being captured. Song Jiang, Liangshan's leader, treats Huyan Zhuo respectfully and convinces him to surrender and join the Liangshan cause and fight the corrupt government.

Huyan Zhuo returns to Qingzhou and tricks Murong Yanda into opening the city gates, allowing the outlaws to enter and kill the governor. All the outlaws then return to Liangshan together after their victory.

== Life as an outlaw ==
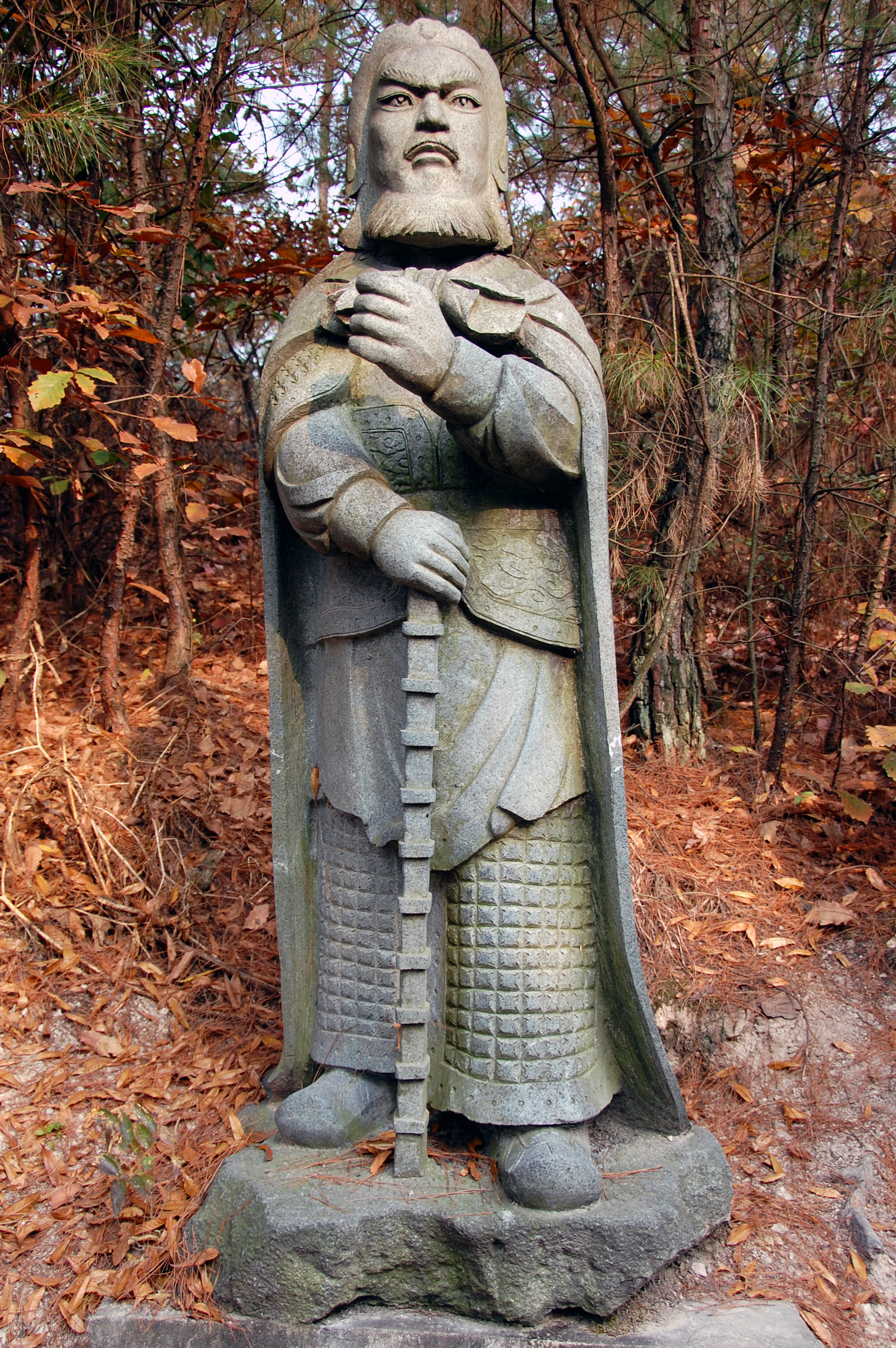
A stone statue of Huyan Zhuo at Hengdian World Studios

The Song government later sends Guan Sheng on a mission to wipe out the Liangshan outlaws. Huyan Zhuo secretly arranged to meet Guan claiming that he has reluctantly surrender, lying that he has pretended to join the outlaws in order to fool them and find a chance to redeem himself by destroying them.

Guan Sheng, though initially suspicious of Huyan Zhuo, chooses to believe him and falls into an ambush while leading a night raid on the Liangshan camp. Like Huyan Zhuo before him, Guan Sheng is convinced by Song Jiang to surrender and pledges himself to the Liangshan cause.

== Campaigns and death ==
Huyan Zhuo is appointed as one of the Five Tiger Generals of the Liangshan cavalry after the 108 Heroes are fully assembled. He participates in the campaigns against the Liao invaders and rebel forces in Song territory after the outlaws receive amnesty from Emperor Huizong.

Huyan Zhuo survives the deadly campaigns, which cost the lives of about two-thirds of the 108 Heroes. For his contributions during the campaigns, he is reinstated as a military officer and put in command of troops in the imperial capital.

The novel General Yue Fei, set in the early 12th century, mentions that Huyan Zhuo is killed in battle during the Jin–Song wars by the Jin prince Wuzhu.
