= Xunyang River =

Section of Yangtze River north of Jiujiang, Jiangxi, China

Coordinates: 29.72144548°N 115.94453872°E

Xunyang River (Chinese: 浔阳江; pinyin: Xúnyáng Jiāng) is a section of Yangtze River north of Jiujiang, Jiangxi province, China.

Jiujiang had ancient names like Chaisang (Chinese: 柴桑; pinyin: Cháisāng) and Xunyang (Chinese: 浔阳; pinyin: Xúnyáng), thus the section of Yangtze River passing Jiujiang was thus named. Today, there is a district called Xunyang District in Jiujiang.
