= Yan Poxi =

Water Margin character

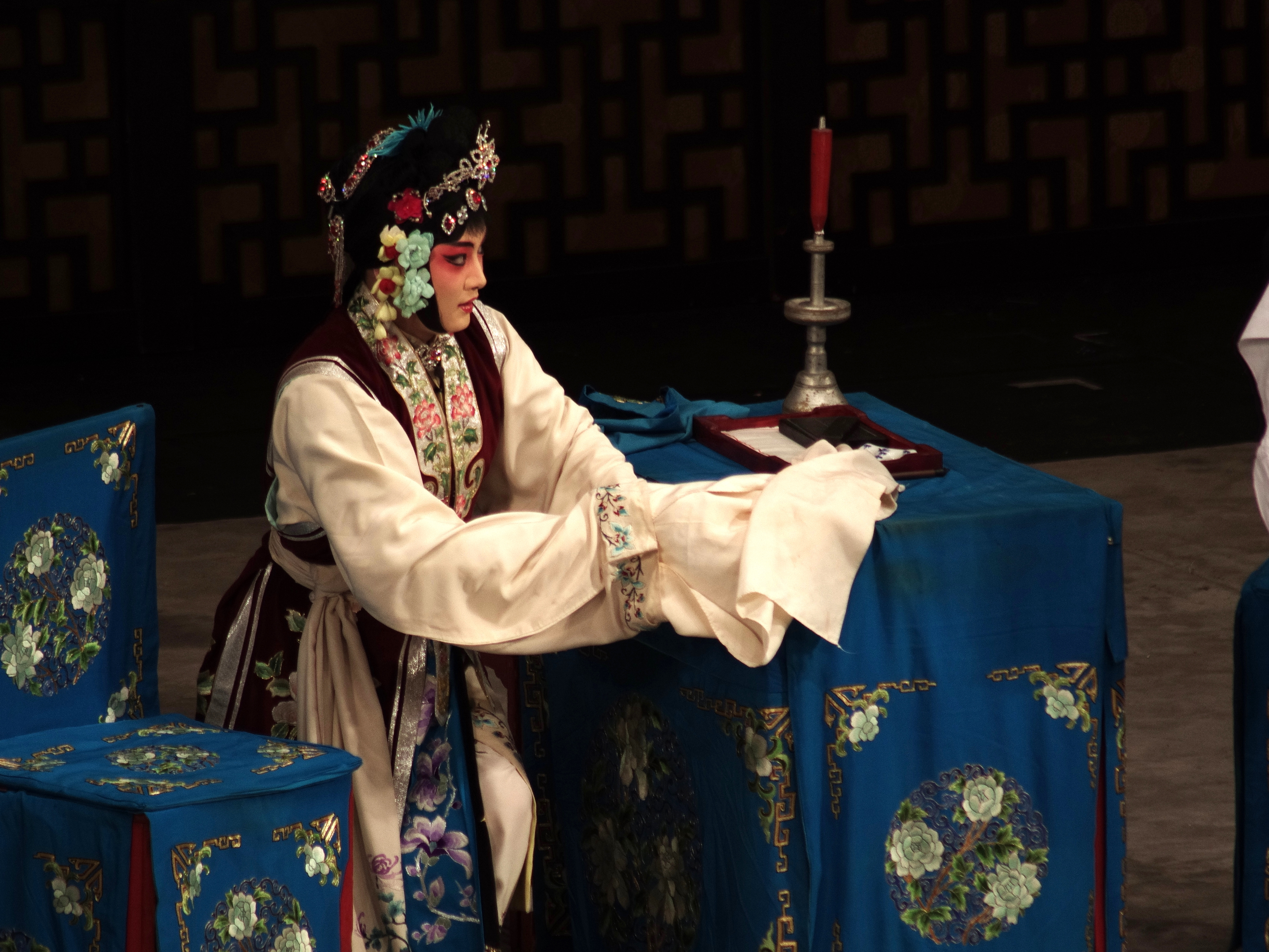
Yan depicted in Peking opera.

Yan Poxi (Chinese: 閻婆惜; pinyin: Yán Póxī) is a fictional Song dynasty woman from the Chinese novel Water Margin. She is usually called Yan Xijiao (Chinese: 閻惜嬌), a Hua Dan, in Chinese opera.

Originally from the national capital Kaifeng, Yan Poxi is a beautiful young girl who came to Shandong with her parents to find a relative, but unable to find him they are stuck in Yuncheng County and depend on Yan Poxi's singing to get by. Her father dies, but she and her mother are too poor to give him a proper burial. After learning about their situation, the Yuncheng County clerk Song Jiang pays for his funeral. Her mother then pressures her to marry Song Jiang as a way to express her gratitude. Because Song Jiang does not spend much time with her, Yan Poxi quickly starts an affair with Song's assistant Zhang Wenyuan after her marriage.

One night, she discovers Chao Gai's letter to Song Jiang, and threatens to report Song Jiang to the magistrate for associating with the outlaws unless he agrees to three conditions: 1) allow her to marry Zhang Wenyuan; 2) let her keep all the clothes, ornaments, property, etc., he has given her; and 3) give her the gold bars from Chao Gai. Song Jiang agrees but cannot fulfil the third condition because he only accepted one of the one hundred gold bars mentioned in Chao Gai's letter. Yan Poxi refuses to believe him and continues to threaten to report him. Song Jiang eventually loses patience and stabs her to death in a fit of anger. He then burns the letter and escapes from Yuncheng County.

In the kunqu Huozhuo (活捉; 'Taken Alive'), the dead Yan becomes a ghost and returns to the human world to take Zhang back with her to hell to continue their affair.
