= Suo Chao =

Fictional character in the Chinese classical novel Water Margin

- Water Margin character
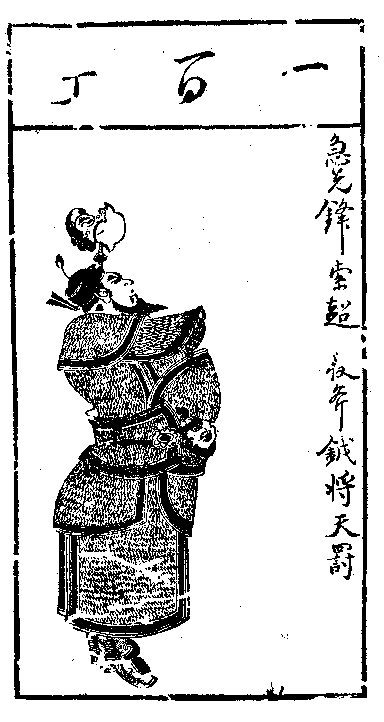
- an illustration of Suo Chao by Chen Hongshou
- First appearance: Chapter 13

In-universe information
- Nicknames: "Impatient Vanguard" 急先鋒
- Weapon: golden axe
- Origin: military officer
- Designation: Tiger Cub Vanguard Commander of Liangshan
- Rank: 19th, Flight Star (天空星) of the 36 Heavenly Spirits
- Ancestral home / Place of origin: Hebei

Chinese names
- Simplified Chinese: 索超
- Traditional Chinese: 索超
- Pinyin: Suǒ Chāo
- Wade–Giles: So Ch'ao

Suo Chao is a fictional character in Water Margin, one of the Classic Chinese Novels. Nicknamed "Impatient Vanguard", he ranks 19th among the 36 Heavenly Spirits, the first third of the 108 Heroes.

== Background ==
The novel describes Suo Chao as a seven chi-tall man with a round face, large ears, a squarish mouth, and a beard which nearly obscures his face. He serves as a military officer under Grand Secretary Liang Shijie, the governor of Daming Prefecture (大名府; present-day Daming County, Hebei). As he is known for his impatience in battle, often charging ahead of his men, he is nicknamed "Impatient Vanguard". He wields a large golden axe (金蘸斧).

== Contest with Yang Zhi ==
Suo Chao is first introduced in the novel in Yang Zhi's story arc. When Yang Zhi is exiled to Daming Prefecture, he attracts the attention of Liang Shijie because of his background and fighting prowess. To test Yang Zhi's skill, Liang Shijie arranges for him to compete with Zhou Jin, Suo Chao's martial arts apprentice who is also serving as a military officer in Daming Prefecture. After Yang Zhi easily beats his opponent, Suo Chao, as Zhou Jin's master, feels humiliated so he steps forward to challenge Yang Zhi to a duel on horseback. Liang Shijie eagerly approves and watches as the two men fight, with neither side managing to gain an edge over the other. Impressed by their skills, Liang Shijie promotes both of them to the same position.

== Becoming an outlaw ==
Suo Chao appears again in a later chapter when the outlaws from Liangshan Marsh, led by Song Jiang, are attacking Daming Prefecture to save their captured comrades Lu Junyi and Shi Xiu. Liang Shijie orders Suo Chao to lead troops to engage the outlaws in battle, and Suo duels with Liangshan's Qin Ming on horseback. During the duel, Suo Chao is forced to retreat after Liangshan's Han Tao fires an arrow which hits him in the left arm.

The outlaws temporarily withdraw as Song Jiang has fallen critically ill. After he recovers and leads the outlaws to attack the prefecture again, it is already winter and there is heavy snowfall. Song Jiang pretends to approach the city walls to survey the fortifications, accompanied by only a few men. Suo Chao, eager to capture the outlaw leader and gain the top credit, charges out and chases Song Jiang. He ends up falling into a hidden pit and gets taken captive by the outlaws. Song Jiang frees Suo Chao, treats him respectfully, and manages to convince him to surrender and join the Liangshan cause.

== Campaigns and death ==
Suo Chao is appointed as one of the eight Tiger Cub Vanguard Commanders of the Liangshan cavalry after the 108 Heroes are fully assembled. He participates in the campaigns against the Liao invaders and rebel forces in Song territory after the outlaws receive amnesty from Emperor Huizong.

During the final campaign against Fang La's rebel forces, Suo Chao is assigned to attack the north gate of Hangzhou, where he encounters the enemy warrior Shi Bao. Feigning defeat, Shi Bao lures Suo Chao to pursue him. Suo Chao is caught off guard when Shi Bao suddenly turns back and attacks him, instantly killing him. When the campaign is over, the emperor honours Suo Chao for his contributions by awarding him the posthumous title "Martial Gentleman of Loyalty" (忠武郎).
