= Dong Ping =

Fictional character in the Chinese classical novel Water Margin

- Water Margin character
- An illustration of Dong Ping by Chen Hongshou
- First appearance: Chapter 69

In-universe information
- Aliases: "Refined and Cultured General of Double Spears" 風流雙槍將
- Nicknames: "General of Double Spears" 雙槍將
- Weapon: pair of spears
- Origin: military officer
- Designation: Central General of the Five Tiger Generals of Liangshan
- Rank: 15th, Steadfast Star (天立星) of the 36 Heavenly Spirits
- Ancestral home / Place of origin: Shangdang (around present-day Yuncheng, Shanxi)

Chinese names
- Simplified Chinese: 董平
- Traditional Chinese: 董平
- Pinyin: Dǒng Píng
- Wade–Giles: Tung P'ing

Dong Ping is a fictional character in Water Margin, one of the Classic Chinese Novels. Nicknamed "General of Double Spears", he ranks 15th among the 36 Heavenly Spirits, the first third of the 108 Heroes.

== Historical basis ==
According to the 13th-century text Miscellaneous Observations from the Year of Guixin (癸辛雜識) by Zhou Mi, the historical figure Song Jiang, who had led a rebellion against the Song dynasty in the early 12th century, had 36 followers. One of them was named Dong Ping.

According to the 17th-century text A Brief History of the Heroes at the Beginning of the Nation (國初群雄事略) by Qian Qianyi, the Ming dynasty's founding emperor Zhu Yuanzhang, in his early days as a soldier, used a pair of spears in battle. The longer one was 16 chi long, with a shaft as thick as his hand, and was used in combat on foot; the shorter was 12 chi long and mainly used for fighting on horseback. Both spears were made from bamboo poles, painted black, and had black tassels and small flags hanging on them. The 11th-century text Zizhi Tongjian also recorded that the general Wang Yanzhang of the Five Dynasties and Ten Kingdoms period "used two iron spears in every battle, both weighing 100 jin, one placed in the saddle and the other in his hand, and he was invincible." Dong Ping's characterisation in Water Margin is believed to be inspired by these descriptions.

== Background ==
A native of Shangdang (上黨; around present-day Yuncheng, Shanxi), Dong Ping serves as a military officer in Dongping Prefecture (東平府; present-day Dongping County, Shandong). A fearsome warrior, he is nicknamed "General of Double Spears" as he fights with a pair of spears. The novel also describes him as a handsome man with a sophisticated taste for the arts, hence he is also called "Refined and Cultured General of Double Spears".

== Becoming an outlaw ==
A Qing dynasty illustration of Dong Ping

Dong Ping is first introduced when the outlaws at Liangshan Marsh, unable to decide between Song Jiang and Lu Junyi, split into two groups under either's command to attack Dongping and Dongchang prefectures under the agreement that whoever captures his target first will be the next chief of Liangshan.

Song Jiang sends Yu Baosi and Wang Dingliu to meet Dongping Prefecture's governor Cheng Wanli, hoping to intimidate him into surrendering. Although the governor is initially fearful, he calms down after Dong Ping steps in to calm him down. Dong Ping suggests executing Yu Baosi and Wang Dingliu, but Cheng Wanli orders them to be flogged and chased out.

Liangshan's Shi Jin volunteers to make use of his relationship with a prostitute in Dongping to infiltrate the prefecture and serve as a spy for the outlaws. However, the brothel owner secretly reports him to the prefect, resulting in his capture. Song Jiang then orders the outlaws to launch an assault on the prefecture. During the battle, Dong Ping duels on horseback with many of Liangshan's best warriors, with neither side managing to gain an advantage over the other. Impressed with Dong Ping's skill, Song Jiang is determined to win him over.

One night, the outlaws lure Dong Ping out of the prefecture and lead him into a trap. Dong Ping is captured by the outlaws after falling into a pit. Song Jiang frees him, treats him respectfully, and manages to convince him to join the Liangshan cause. Moved by Song Jiang's sincerity, Dong Ping agrees to join the outlaws. He returns to Dongping Prefecture and tricks Cheng Wanli into opening the gate, allowing the outlaws to enter and capture the prefecture. Already holding a grudge against Cheng Wanli for rejecting his proposal to marry Cheng's daughter, Dong Ping kills the governor and forces Cheng's daughter to marry him.

== Death ==
Dong Ping is appointed as one of the Five Tiger Generals of the Liangshan cavalry after the 108 Heroes are fully assembled. He participates in the campaigns against the Liao invaders and rebel forces in Song territory after the Liangshan outlaws have received amnesty from Emperor Huizong.

During the final campaign against Fang La's forces, Dong Ping and Zhang Qing are assigned to attack Dusong Pass (獨松關; located south of present-day Anji County, Zhejiang), where they face the enemy warriors Li Tianrun and Zhang Tao. After being injured in the left arm by a projectile, Dong Ping retreats and leaves Zhang Qing to continue the fight with Li Tianrun. When Zhang Qing's spear gets stuck in a tree, Li Tianrun seizes the chance to kill him. Dong Ping, still wounded, charges forth and kills Li Tianrun to avenge his fallen comrade, but loses his life when Zhang Tao sneaks up on him and slices him in two from behind.
