= Han Tao =

Fictional character in the Chinese classical novel Water Margin

- Water Margin character
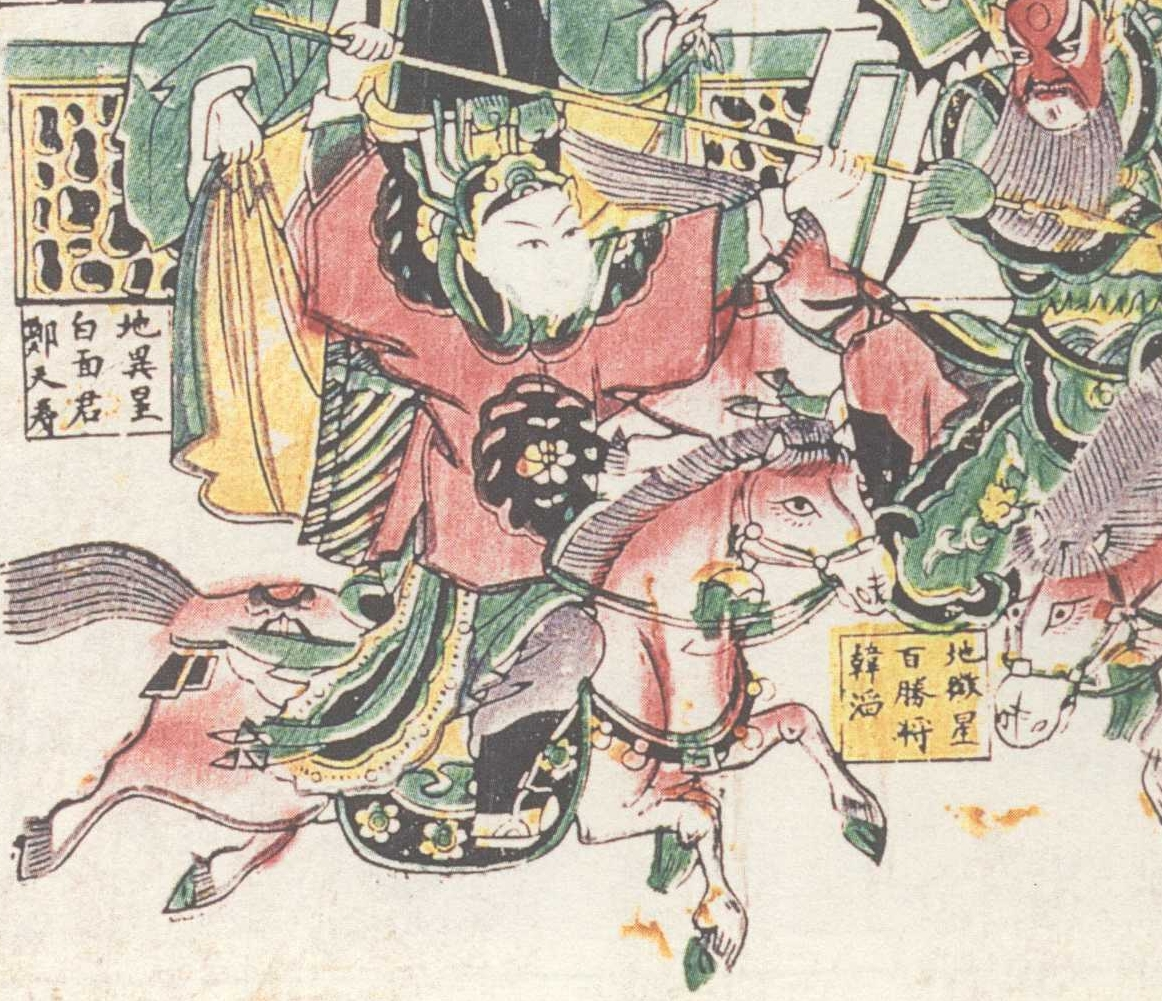
- a Qing dynasty illustration of Han Tao
- First appearance: Chapter 55

In-universe information
- Nickname: "General of a Hundred Victories" 百勝將
- Weapon: jujube wood lance (棗木槊)
- Origin: military officer
- Designation: Tiger Cub Patrol Commander of Liangshan
- Rank: 42nd, Majestic Star (地威星) of the 72 Earthly Fiends
- Ancestral home / Place of origin: Dongjing (present-day Kaifeng, Henan)

Chinese names
- Simplified Chinese: 韩滔
- Traditional Chinese: 韓滔
- Pinyin: Hán Tāo
- Wade–Giles: Han T'ao

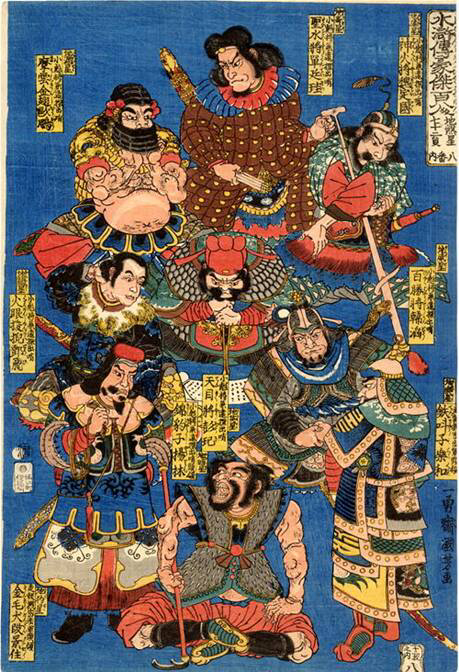
An illustration of nine of the 108 Heroes by Utagawa Kuniyoshi. Peng Qi is in the centre. The rest are (clockwise from top): Shan Tinggui, Wei Dingguo, Han Tao, Yue He, Yang Lin, Duan Jingzhu, Deng Fei, and Ou Peng.

Han Tao is a fictional character in Water Margin, one of the Classic Chinese Novels. Nicknamed "General of Hundred Victories", he ranks 42nd among the 108 Heroes and sixth among the 72 Earthly Fiends.

== Background ==
Originally from the capital Dongjing (東京; present-day Kaifeng, Henan), Han Tao is a highly-skilled warrior serving as a military officer in Chenzhou (陳州; present-day Huaiyang County, Henan). He is nicknamed "General of a Hundred Victories" as he is purportedly unbeatable in combat, wielding a lance made of jujube wood.

== Becoming an outlaw ==
Han Tao is first introduced in the novel when the Song government is discussing how to deal with the outlaws at Liangshan Marsh after they attacked and captured Gaotangzhou (高唐州; present-day Gaotang County, Shandong). Along with Peng Qi, Han Tao is appointed as a lieutenant of Huyan Zhuo, who is tasked with leading government forces to destroy the outlaws.

In their first battle against Liangshan, Peng Qi is captured by Hu Sanniang and ends up joining the outlaws. Huyan Zhuo then deploys his special cavalry comprising groups of heavily armoured horsemen connected by chains. The combined might of the horsemen charging forward overwhelms the Liangshan forces.

The outlaws eventually recruit Xu Ning, who trains their infantry in using the hooked lance, targeting the armoured cavalry's weak point: the horses' legs. The method works out and the outlaws defeat Huyan Zhuo, completely destroying his chain-linked armoured cavalry. Han Tao gets captured during the battle and ends up joining the outlaws after Peng Qi convinces him to. Huyan Zhuo himself is ultimately defeated by the outlaws and agrees to surrender and join them too.

== Campaigns and death ==
Han Tao is appointed as a Tiger Cub Patrol Commander of the Liangshan cavalry after the 108 Heroes are fully assembled. He participates in the campaigns against the Liao invaders and rebel forces in Song territory after the outlaws receive amnesty from Emperor Huizong.

During the final campaign against Fang La's rebel forces, Han Tao and Peng Qi are assigned to attack Changzhou, where they face the enemy warriors Gao Keli and Zhang Jinren. Han Tao falls off horseback when Gao Keli fires an arrow that hits him in the cheek. After that, Zhang Jinren charges forward and kills Han Tao by spearing him in the throat.
