= Xu Ning =

Fictional character in the Chinese classical novel Water Margin

- Water Margin character
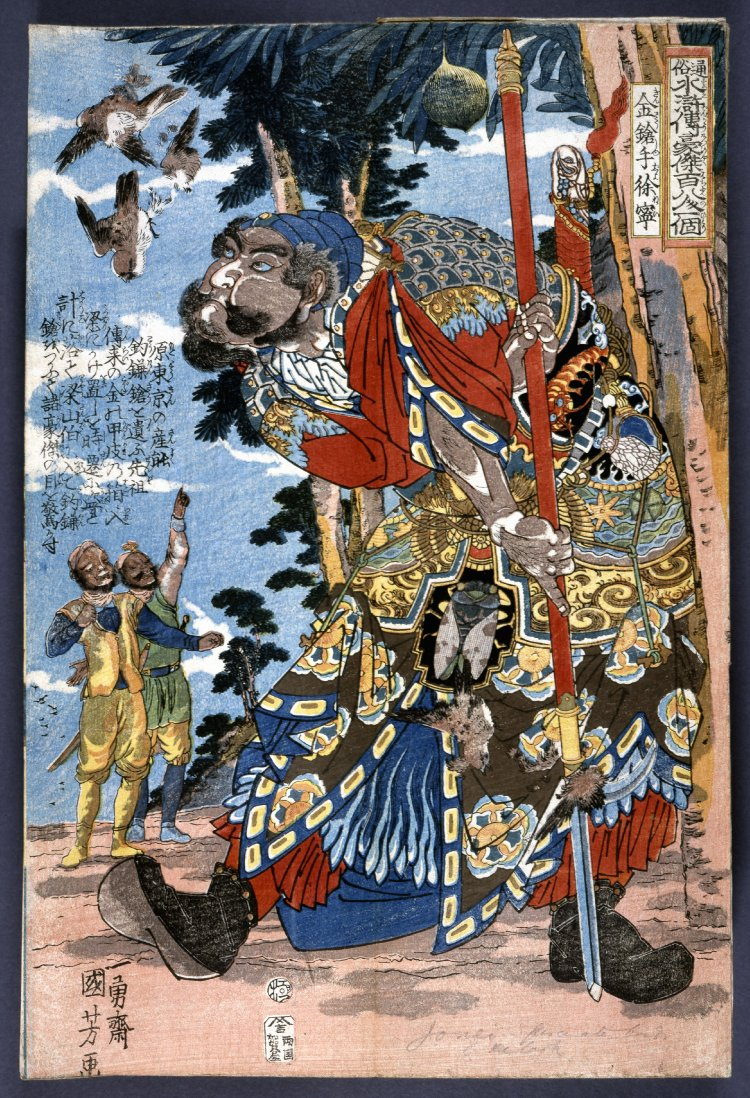
- an illustration of Xu Ning by Utagawa Kuniyoshi
- First appearance: Chapter 56

In-universe information
- Nicknames: "Gold Lancer" 金槍手
- Weapon: hooked lance (鈎鐮槍)
- Origin: martial arts instructor
- Designation: Tiger Cub Vanguard Commander of Liangshan
- Rank: 18th, Guardian Star (天祐星) of the 36 Heavenly Spirits
- Ancestral home / Place of origin: Henan

Chinese names
- Simplified Chinese: 徐宁
- Traditional Chinese: 徐寧
- Pinyin: Xú Níng
- Wade–Giles: Hsü Ning

Xu Ning is a fictional character in Water Margin, one of the Classic Chinese Novels. Nicknamed "Gold Lancer", he ranks 18th among the 36 Heavenly Spirits, the first third of the 108 Heroes.

== Background ==
The novel describes Xu Ning as a man six chi tall with a pale face, thick eyebrows, a thin moustache, and a narrow waist. An expert at using the spear / lance, he is a rare master of the hooked lance, a lance with a hook attached next to the tip. He serves as the martial arts instructor of the Gold Lancers Unit (金槍班) of the imperial guards in the capital Dongjing (東京; present-day Kaifeng, Henan).

== Becoming an outlaw ==
When the Song government sends Huyan Zhuo to lead troops to eliminate the outlaws at Liangshan Marsh, Huyan Zhuo deploys his special chain-linked cavalry, which comprises groups of heavily armoured horsemen connected by chains. When the horsemen charge forward as consolidated units, their stampede overwhelms the outlaws on the battlefield, forcing them to retreat to their stronghold in the marshes.

While the Liangshan commander Song Jiang is discussing with the other outlaw leaders about how to counter Huyan Zhuo's cavalry, Tang Long recommends his maternal cousin, Xu Ning, to join Liangshan and train their infantry in using the hooked lance. Song Jiang approves and sends Tang Long, along with Dai Zong, Shi Qian, and Yue He, to Dongjing to lure Xu Ning to Liangshan.

Shi Qian sneaks into Xu Ning's house one night and steals his family heirloom – a golden armoured vest impervious to sharp weapons. While Xu Ning is fretting over the apparent loss of his vest, Tang Long shows up and offers to help him hunt down the thief and retrieve the vest.

After days of pursuit, Xu Ning and Tang Long seem to be catching up with Shi Qian, but they always show up a little too late to intercept him. During this time, Xu Ning has not realised that he is getting closer and closer to Liangshan Marsh. They meet Yue He, who is in disguise as a merchant, and take a ride in his carriage in the hope of speeding up. On the ride, Xu Ning unsuspectingly accepts an alcoholic drink spiked with menghanyao (蒙汗藥) and loses consciousness.

When Xu Ning comes to, he learns that he is at Liangshan and realises that the theft of his vest is part of the outlaws' plan to lure him there. Though initially angry at Tang Long and the others, he is appeased when he gets back his family heirloom. Moreover, he is surprised to see that his family is also at Liangshan as Dai Zong has fetched them from Dongjing while he was busy chasing Shi Qian. Moved by Song Jiang's sincerity, Xu Ning agrees to join the Liangshan cause and become an outlaw.

Afterwards, Xu Ning trains the Liangshan infantry in using the hooked lance, specifically to counter Huyan Zhuo's cavalry by targeting the formation's weakness: the horses' legs. During the subsequent battle against the government forces led by Huyan Zhuo, the outlaws overcome the chain-linked armoured cavalry by using their hooked lances to attack the horses' legs. Once a single horse is down, it drags down the entire group along with it. The entire formation soon collapses and Huyan Zhuo is forced to flee after suffering a crushing defeat by the outlaws.

== Campaigns and death ==
Xu Ning is appointed as one of the eight Tiger Cub Vanguard Commanders of the Liangshan cavalry after the 108 Heroes are fully assembled. He participates in the campaigns against the Liao invaders and rebel forces in Song territory after the outlaws receive amnesty from Emperor Huizong.

During the final campaign against Fang La's rebel forces, Xu Ning and Hao Siwen lead Liangshan forces to face Fang La's son Fang Tianding in battle at Hangzhou. After Hao is captured by the enemy, Xu attempts to save him but gets hit by a poisoned arrow in the neck. He dies of poisoning two weeks later. After the campaign is over, the emperor honours him for his contributions by awarding him the posthumous title "Martial Gentleman of Loyalty" (忠武郎).
