= Ruan Xiaowu =

Fictional character in the Chinese classical novel Water Margin

- Water Margin character
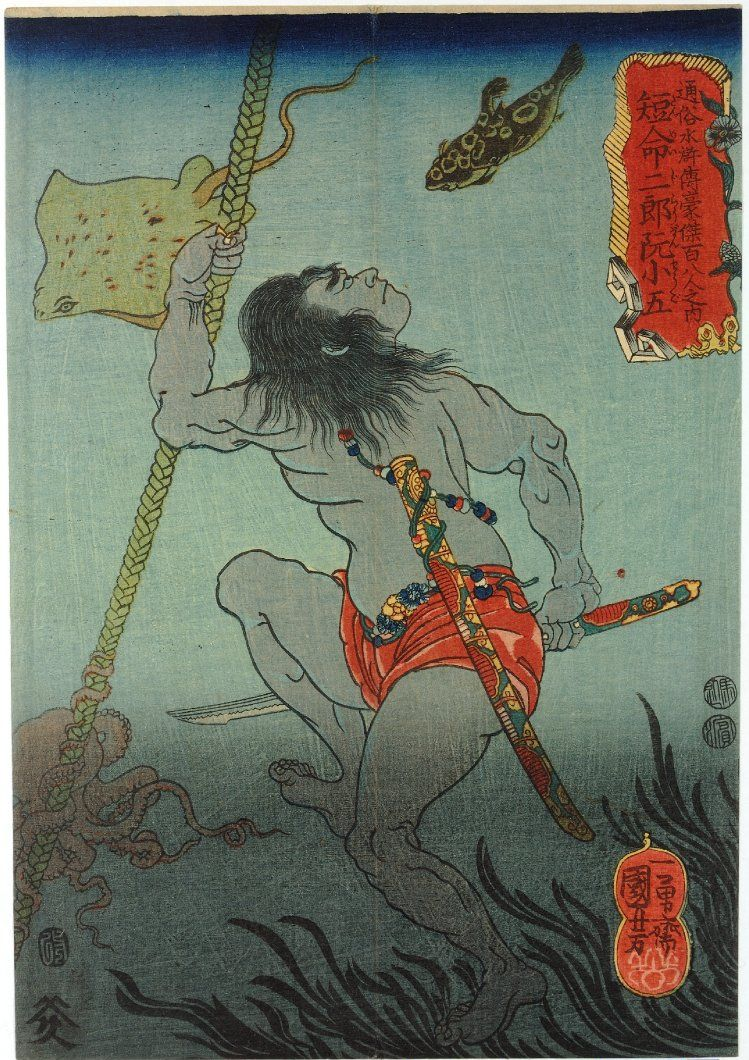
- an illustration of Ruan Xiaowu by Utagawa Kuniyoshi
- First appearance: Chapter 15

In-universe information
- Nicknames: "Short-lived Second Brother" 短命二郎
- Origin: fisherman
- Designation: Naval Commander of Liangshan
- Rank: 29th, Guilt Star (天罪星) of the 36 Heavenly Spirit
- Ancestral home / Place of origin: Shijie Village (in present-day Liangshan County, Shandong)

Chinese names
- Simplified Chinese: 阮小五
- Traditional Chinese: 阮小五
- Pinyin: Ruǎn Xiǎowǔ
- Wade–Giles: Juan Hsiao-wu

Ruan Xiaowu, also known as Ruan the Fifth, is a fictional character in Water Margin, one of the Classic Chinese Novels. Nicknamed "Short-lived Second Brother", he ranks 29th among the 36 Heavenly Spirits of the 108 Heroes.

== Background ==
The novel describes Ruan Xiaowu as a man with eyes shaped like bells, strong and sturdy arms, and a tattoo of a panther on his chest. Although he often wears a smile on his face, he has a murderous glint in his eyes. His nickname "Short-lived Second Brother" suggests that he shows no mercy to those who cross him. He is also a hardcore gambler who has had little luck.

Ruan Xiaowu is the middle of the three Ruan brothers – between Ruan Xiao'er and Ruan Xiaoqi. He lives with his brothers in Shijie Village (石碣村; in present-day Liangshan County, Shandong), where they make a living by fishing in the waters around Liangshan Marsh. All three brothers are exceptional swimmers and skilled fighters both on land and in water.

== Robbing the convoy of birthday gifts ==
The Ruan brothers are first introduced in the novel when Wu Yong recommends them to Chao Gai, the headman of Dongxi Village in Yuncheng County, as potential partners in their plan to rob a convoy of valuable birthday gifts for the corrupt official Cai Jing. Wu Yong then travels to Shijie Village to meet the brothers, pretending to buy fish from them while sussing out their receptivity to the idea.

While Ruan Xiao'er is a little more reserved, Ruan Xiaowu and Ruan Xiaoqi are more straightforward and they soon reveal their discontent with living in poverty and under a corrupt government. When Wu Yong eventually reveals the true purpose of his visit, the Ruan brothers readily accept the invitation to join the heist. They form a team of seven – Chao Gai, Wu Yong, Gongsun Sheng, Liu Tang, and the three Ruan brothers – and plan to strike at Yellow Mud Ridge (黃泥崗) on the outskirts of Yuncheng County.

The seven men collaborate with their accomplice Bai Sheng to trick the soldiers escorting the convoy into consuming alcoholic drinks spiked with menghanyao (蒙汗藥), which causes dizziness and unconsciousness. Once the soldiers are out cold, the seven men make off with the valuables.

== Becoming an outlaw ==
The authorities investigate and soon identify Chao Gai as one of the robbers, despatching soldiers to Dongxi Village to arrest him and his companions. The seven men flee to Shijie Village and hide in the marshes. There, the Ruan brothers, taking advantage of their familiarity with the waterways, lure the unwary soldiers into ambushes and wipe them out. After that, the seven men seek refuge in the outlaw stronghold at Liangshan Marsh. Chao Gai eventually becomes the outlaw band's chief, with Ruan Xiaowu taking the seventh position of leadership.

== Life at Liangshan ==
During his time in Liangshan, Ruan Xiaowu puts his skills to good use in the battles between the outlaws and government forces.

On one occasion, when the artillery officer Ling Zhen bombards Liangshan with cannon fire, the Ruan brothers swim towards the riverside artillery platform undetected, and sabotage the cannons. An infuriated Ling Zhen pursues them into the marshes, where he is ambushed and captured, and ultimately decides to surrender and join the outlaws.

== Campaigns and death ==
Ruan Xiaowu is appointed as a commander of the Liangshan navy after the 108 Heroes are fully assembled. He participates in campaigns against the Liao invaders and rebel forces in Song territory after the outlaws receive amnesty from Emperor Huizong.

During the final campaign against Fang La's rebel forces, Ruan Xiaowu and Li Jun pretend to defect to the enemy during the battle of Qingxi County (清溪縣; present-day Chun'an County, Zhejiang). When the opportunity arises, they set fire to the enemy base and allow the Liangshan forces to enter the county. During this time, Lou Minzhong, one of Fang La's lieutenants, realises Ruan Xiaowu is a spy and kills him.
