= Qin Ming =

Fictional character in the Chinese classical novel Water Margin

- Water Margin character
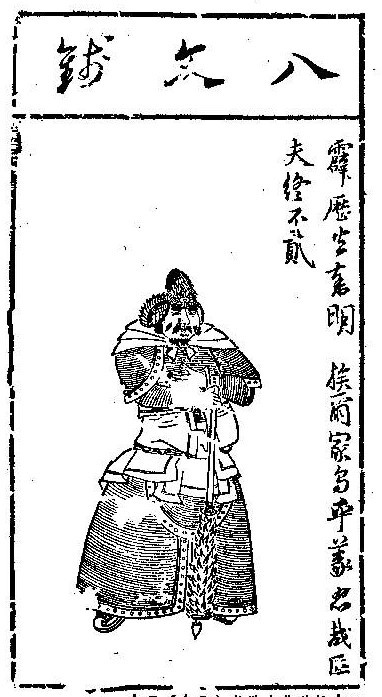
- an illustration of Qin Ming by Chen Hongshou
- First appearance: Chapter 34

In-universe information
- Nicknames: "Fiery Thunderbolt" 霹靂火
- Weapon: wolf-toothed mace
- Origin: military officer
- Designation: Vanguard General of the Five Tiger Generals of Liangshan
- Rank: 7th, Fierce Star (天猛星) of the 36 Heavenly Spirits
- Ancestral home / Place of origin: Kaizhou (present-day Fengcheng, Liaoning)

Chinese names
- Simplified Chinese: 秦明
- Traditional Chinese: 秦明
- Pinyin: Qín Míng
- Wade–Giles: Ch'in Ming

Qin Ming is a fictional character in Water Margin, one of the Classic Chinese Novels. Nicknamed "Fiery Thunderbolt", he ranked seventh among the 36 Heavenly Spirits, the first third of the 108 Heroes.

== Background ==
Originally from Kaizhou (開州; present-day Fengcheng, Liaoning), Qin Ming is first introduced in the novel as a military officer serving in Qingzhou (青州). He is nicknamed "Fiery Thunderbolt" due to his thunderous voice, fiery temper, and impetuousness in battles, which earn him the reputation of a fearsome but reckless warrior. His weapon of choice is a spiked club called a "wolf-toothed mace" (狼牙棒).

== Conflict with the outlaws of Mount Qingfeng ==
When Murong Yanda, the governor of Qingzhou, is informed that Hua Rong, a military officer at Qingfeng Fort (清風寨; in present-day Qingzhou, Shandong), which is under Qingzhou's jurisdiction, has joined the outlaws at the nearby Mount Qingfeng (清風山), he orders Qin Ming to lead troops from Qingzhou to attack the outlaws. Earlier on, Huang Xin, Qin Ming's apprentice who is also serving as a military officer in Qingzhou, has been defeated in battle by the Mount Qingfeng outlaws.

Qin Ming duels with Hua Rong on horseback but neither manages to overcome his opponent. Hua Rong then feigns defeat and flees. Knowing that Qin Ming easily loses his cool, Hua Rong lures him nearer to Mount Qingfeng, where an exhausted Qin Ming eventually falls into a hidden pit and gets captured by the outlaws.

Qin Ming is brought before the outlaws' leader Song Jiang, who frees him, treats him respectfully, and tries to persuade him to join them in resisting the corrupt government. Although Qin Ming takes to Song Jiang, he declines to join the outlaws. Nonetheless, he spends the night at the outlaw stronghold as their guest.

The following day, when Qin Ming returns to Qingzhou, he is shocked to hear Murong Yanda denying him entry into the city and accusing him of betrayal. The governor has also executed Qin Ming's entire family. When a confused Qin Ming tries to force his way in, the governor orders archers to fire at him, driving him back.

Devastated by the loss of his family, Qin Ming wanders around until he meets the Mount Qingfeng outlaws again. It turns out that the outlaws had disguised themselves as Qin Ming and his men and attacked Qingzhou the previous night, causing Murong Yanda to misunderstand that Qin had defected to the outlaws' side.

Although Qin Ming is initially outraged, he eventually calms down and accepts his fate. To appease Qin Ming, Song Jiang arranges for Hua Rong's sister to marry him. Qin Ming agrees and becomes an outlaw.

After his defection, Qin Ming goes to find Huang Xin and manages to convince him to surrender and join the outlaws too. The outlaws then evacuate Mount Qingfeng and join the outlaw band at Liangshan Marsh.

== Life at Liangshan ==
Qin Ming gets his chance to avenge his family when the Liangshan outlaws attack Qingzhou later. This comes at a time when Huyan Zhuo, who has earlier been tasked with leading government forces to eliminate Liangshan, is defeated by the outlaws and forced to take shelter in Qingzhou. Hoping to redeem himself after his defeat, Huyan Zhuo offers to help Murong Yanda deal with the outlaws at Mount Twin Dragons, who then seek help from the Liangshan outlaws, drawing them into the conflict.

The Liangshan outlaws defeat Huyan Zhuo again, capture him, and manage to convince him to join the Liangshan cause. After that, Huyan Zhuo returns to Qingzhou and tricks Murong Yanda into opening the city gates and coming out to receive him. Qin Ming, in disguise as one of Huyan Zhuo's men, seizes the chance to kill Murong Yanda.

As one of Liangshan's most formidable warriors, Qin Ming participates in most of the battles against Liangshan's enemies and defeats the enemy's top fighters. There are a few times when he almost loses his life due to his hot temper and impatience.

== Death ==
Qin Ming is appointed as one of the Five Tiger Generals of the Liangshan cavalry after the 108 Heroes are fully assembled. He participates in the campaigns against the Liao invaders and rebel forces in the Song territory after the outlaws receive amnesty from Emperor Huizong.

During the final campaign against Fang La's rebel forces, Qin Ming duels on horseback with Fang Jie when the Liangshan forces are attacking Qingxi County (清溪縣; present-day Chun'an County, Zhejiang). Fang Jie's deputy, Du Wei, hurls daggers at Qin Ming, who manages to dodge them. While Qin Ming is distracted, Fang Jie seizes the chance to spear him to death.

After the campaigns are over, Qin Ming is posthumously honoured by Emperor Huizong as a "Martial Gentleman of Loyalty" (忠武郎).
