= Duan Jingzhu =

Fictional character in the Chinese classical novel Water Margin

- Water Margin character
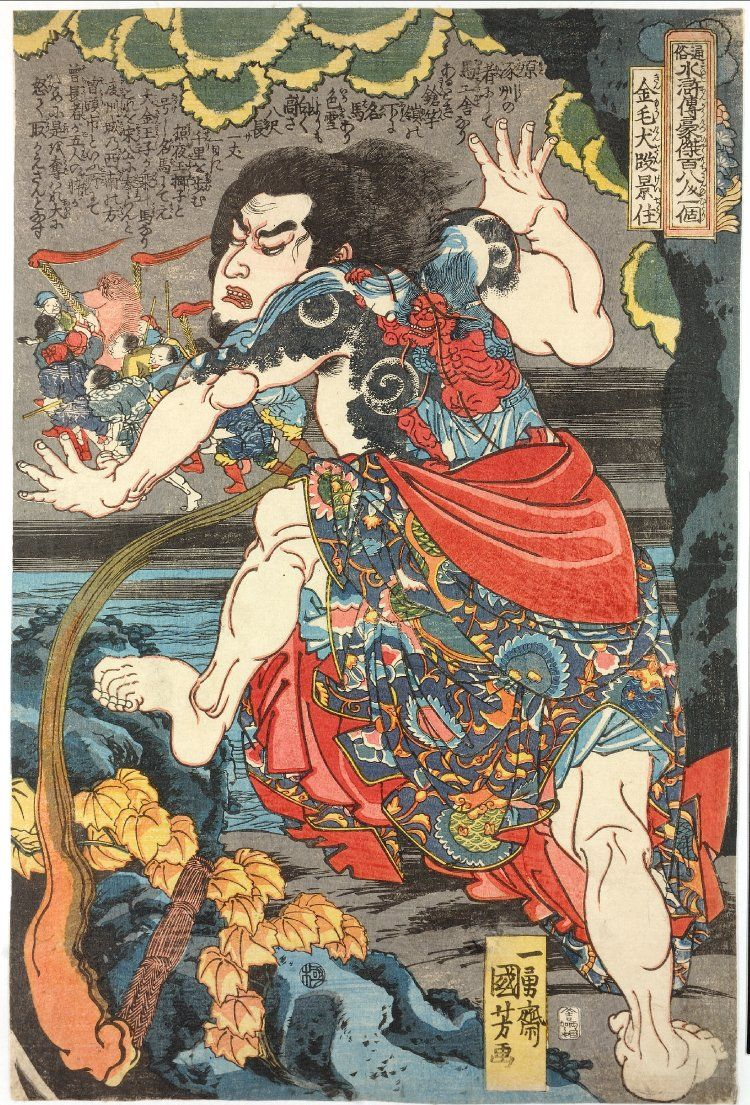
- an illustration of Duan Jingzhu by Utagawa Kuniyoshi
- First appearance: Chapter 60

In-universe information
- Nicknames: "Golden-haired Hound" 金毛犬
- Weapon: horse whip
- Origin: horse thief
- Designation: Infantry Commander of Liangshan
- Rank: 108th, Hound Star (地狗星) of the 72 Earthly Fiends
- Ancestral home / Place of origin: Zhuozhou, Hebei

Chinese names
- Simplified Chinese: 段景住
- Traditional Chinese: 段景住
- Pinyin: Duàn Jǐngzhù
- Wade–Giles: Tuan Ching-chu

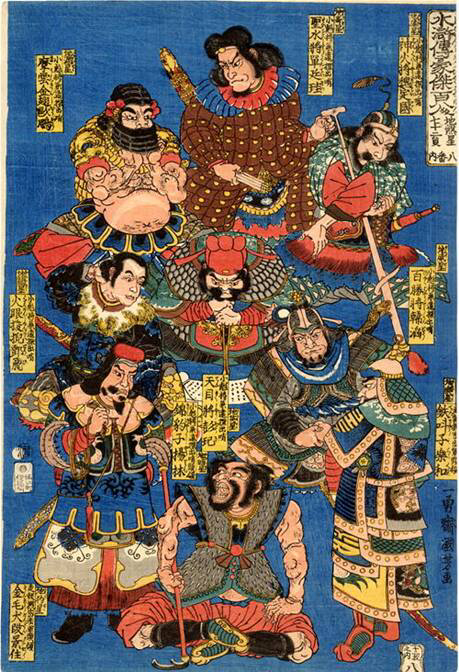
An illustration of nine of the 108 Heroes by Utagawa Kuniyoshi. Peng Qi is in the centre. The rest are (clockwise from top): Shan Tinggui, Wei Dingguo, Han Tao, Yue He, Yang Lin, Duan Jingzhu, Deng Fei, and Ou Peng.

Duan Jingzhu is a fictional character in Water Margin, one of the Classic Chinese Novels. Nicknamed "Golden-haired Hound", he ranks 108th among the 108 Heroes and 72nd among the 72 Earthly Fiends.

== Background ==
The novel describes Duan Jingzhu as a man with a head full of curly reddish hair and yellowish facial hair, which earn him the nickname "Golden-haired Dog". Originally from Zhuozhou, he rustles horses for a living on the northern frontier of the Song Empire.

== Becoming an outlaw ==
Duan Jingzhu is first introduced in the novel when he meets Song Jiang and the Liangshan Marsh outlaws, who are on their way back to Liangshan after pacifying Mount Mangdang. Earlier, he had stolen a impressively built and fast-moving white horse – called the "Night-illuminating Jade Lion Horse" (照夜玉獅子馬) – from a Jurchen prince at Spear Shaft Ridge (鎗竿嶺; around present-day Yu County, Hebei), and had intended to present it to Song Jiang as his ticket to join the outlaw band. When he passed by the Zeng Family Fortress (曾頭市; southwest of present-day Dezhou, Shandong), a fortified village run by a family of five brothers and their father, he was attacked by the Zengs and robbed of the horse. After he told the Zengs who the horse was meant for, they insulted Song Jiang with "language too filthy to be mentioned". Duan Jingzhu had then gone to report the situation to Song Jiang, who is so fascinated with Duan's appearance that he takes Duan back to Liangshan to meet the outlaws' chief, Chao Gai.

After Chao Gai hears of the Zengs' deed and insults directed at Liangshan, he is so infuriated that he wants to teach them a lesson. Since Song Jiang has been leading the outlaws in the past battles against their enemies, Chao Gai decides to take the lead to attack the Zeng Family Fortress. The first battle between the Liangshan outlaws and the Zengs ends in a disaster: Chao Gai is struck in the face by a poisoned arrow fired by Shi Wengong, a martial arts instructor serving under the Zengs, and dies of poisoning shortly after. Song Jiang eventually succeeds Chao Gai as Liangshan's chief, and the outlaws also avenge Chao by destroying the Zengs and killing Shi Wengong.

== Campaigns and death ==
Duan Jingzhu is appointed as a commander of the Liangshan infantry after the 108 Heroes are fully assembled. His task is to deliver intelligence reports to and from the frontline.

After Emperor Huizong grants amnesty to the Liangshan outlaws, Duan Jingzhu joins them in the campaigns against the Liao invaders and rebel forces in Song territory.

During the final campaign against Fang La's rebel forces, Duan Jingzhu joins Liangshan marines in staging a naval assault on Hangzhou via the Qiantang River. Strong winds sweep his boat into the open sea, where it capsizes. A non-swimmer, Duan Jingzhu eventually drowns. The emperor awards him the posthumous title "Righteous Gentleman of Integrity" (義節郎) to honour him for his contributions during the campaigns.
