= Zhu Wu =

Fictional character in the Chinese classical novel Water Margin

- Water Margin character
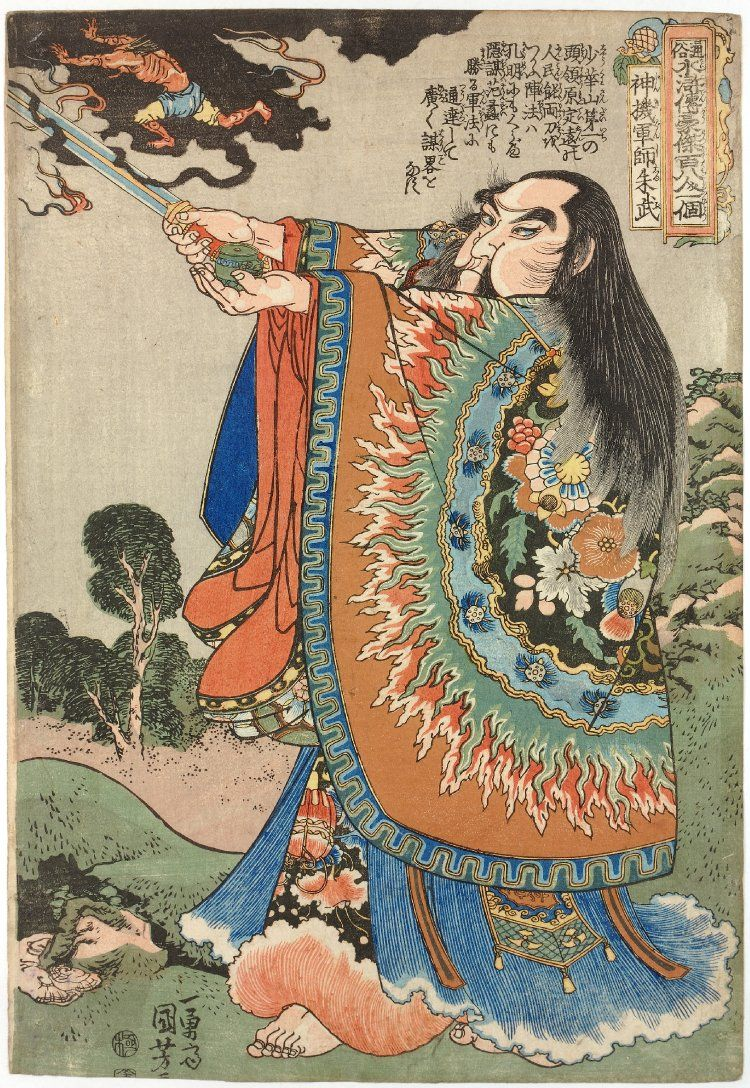
- an illustration of Zhu Wu by Utagawa Kuniyoshi
- First appearance: Chapter 2

In-universe information
- Nickname: "Resourceful Strategist" 神機軍師
- Weapon: pair of swords
- Origin: outlaw
- Designation: Strategist of Liangshan
- Rank: 37th, Leader Star (地魁星) of the 72 Earthly Fiends
- Ancestral home / Place of origin: Dingyuan (present-day Dingyuan County, Anhui)

Chinese names
- Simplified Chinese: 朱武
- Traditional Chinese: 朱武
- Pinyin: Zhū Wǔ
- Wade–Giles: Chu Wu

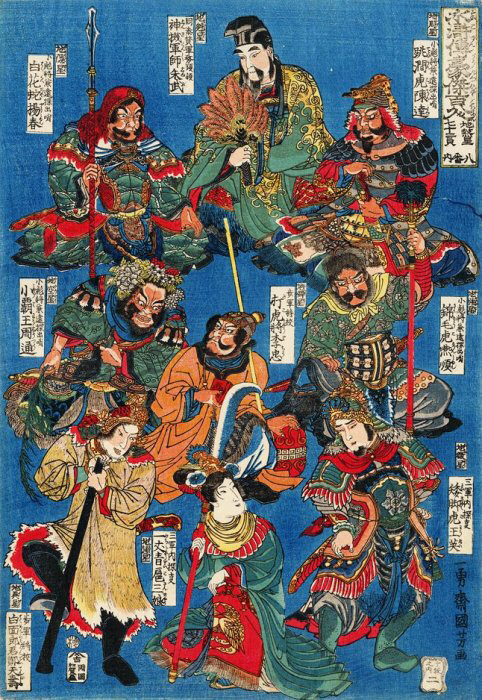
An illustration of nine of the 108 Heroes by Utagawa Kuniyoshi. Li Zhong is in the centre. The rest are (clockwise from top): Zhu Wu, Chen Da, Yan Shun, Wang Ying, Hu Sanniang, Zheng Tianshou, Zhou Tong, and Yang Chun.

Zhu Wu is a fictional character in Water Margin, one of the Classic Chinese Novels. Nicknamed "Resourceful Strategist", he ranks 37th among the 108 Heroes and first among the 72 Earthly Fiends.

== Background ==
Zhu Wu is first introduced in the novel as one of three leaders of an outlaw band based at Mount Shaohua (少華山; southeast of present-day Hua County, Shaanxi), taking the first position of leadership while his sworn brothers Chen Da and Yang Chun take the second and third respectively. Nicknamed "Resourceful Strategist", he is described as a handsome man with blazing eyes and a long, sleek beard. Often dressed in a Taoist robe and carrying a hand fan made of crane feathers, he is known for being well-versed in military strategy and the Qimen Dunjia. A skilled swordsman, he uses a pair of swords in combat. He is originally from Dingyuan (定遠; present-day Dingyuan County, Anhui).

== Befriending Shi Jin ==
On one occasion, Chen Da leads his men to plunder Huayin County for supplies when the outlaw stronghold is experiencing a shortage. En route, he passes by the Shi Family Village and encounters the headman Shi Jin, a formidable martial artist. Despite being warned earlier by Zhu Wu about Shi Jin's prowess, Chen Da pushes his luck, challenges Shi Jin to fight him on horseback, and ends up being defeated and captured.

Realising that they stand no chance against Shi Jin in combat, Zhu Wu and Yang Chun come to the village and beg Shi Jin to release their sworn brother, whom they have pledged to live and die together with. Touched by their strong sense of brotherhood, Shi Jin frees Chen Da and befriends the three outlaw chiefs. Since then, they have been exchanging gifts and taking turns to host each other.

One day, a hunter finds a letter sent to Shi Jin by the outlaws, and reports it to the authorities. Hoping to capture the outlaw leaders, the authorities send soldiers to surround the village when Shi Jin is hosting a feast for them. When the three leaders advise Shi Jin to turn them in so that he will not be implicated, Shi Jin refuses and sides with the outlaws instead. He joins them in fighting their way out after setting fire to the village. After they have safely retreated to their stronghold on Mount Shaohua, the trio invites Shi Jin to be the outlaw band's chief but he declines and leaves to find his master, Wang Jin.

After wandering around for some time, Shi Jin heads back to Mount Shaohua and accepts the trio's invitation to take the first position of leadership in the outlaw band.

== Joining Liangshan ==
One day, Shi Jin learns that Prefect He, the governor of Huazhou, has abducted a painter's daughter to force her to be his concubine, and decides to intervene. While sneaking into the governor's residence to save the woman, he falls into a trap and gets captured.

Around the time, Shi Jin's friend Lu Zhishen, who has joined the outlaw band at Liangshan Marsh, has travelled to Mount Shaohua to find Shi Jin and invite him to join Liangshan. Upon learning of what happened, he infiltrates Huazhou alone in an attempt to rescue Shi Jin, but ends up being lured into an ambush and gets taken captive as well.

The Mount Shaohua outlaws turn to their Liangshan counterparts for assistance, so the Liangshan outlaws travel to Huazhou, where they disguise themselves as officials sent by the emperor. Prefect He falls for the ruse and comes out of the city to welcome the "officials", who then reveal their true identities and kill him. The outlaws then break into Huazhou and rescue Shi Jin and Lu Zhishen, after which the Mount Shaohua outlaws decide to join the larger outlaw band at Liangshan.

== Campaigns ==
Zhu Wu is appointed as one of Liangshan's strategists after the 108 Heroes are fully assembled. He participates in the campaigns against the Liao invaders and rebel forces in Song territory after the outlaws receive amnesty from Emperor Huizong.

The final campaign against Fang La's rebel forces costs the lives of nearly two-thirds of the 108 Heroes, including Zhu Wu's two sworn brothers. After the campaign is over, while the other survivors return to the Song capital to report their victory to the emperor, Zhu Wu and Fan Rui choose to leave and join Liangshan's sorcerer Gongsun Sheng in practising Taoism for the rest of their lives.
