= Peach Flower Village =

Chinese opera comedy

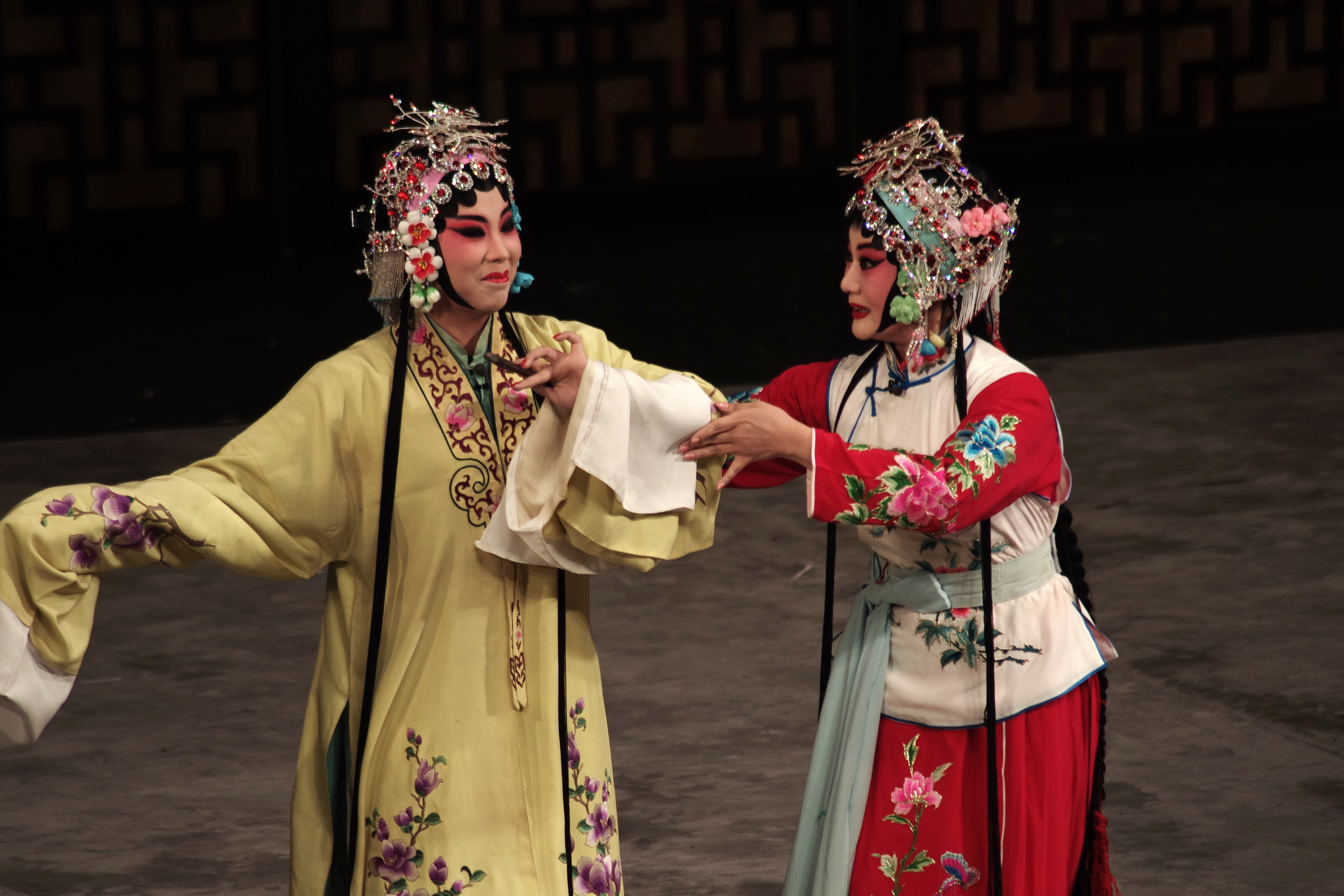
Liu Yuyan and Chunlan depicted in Peking opera

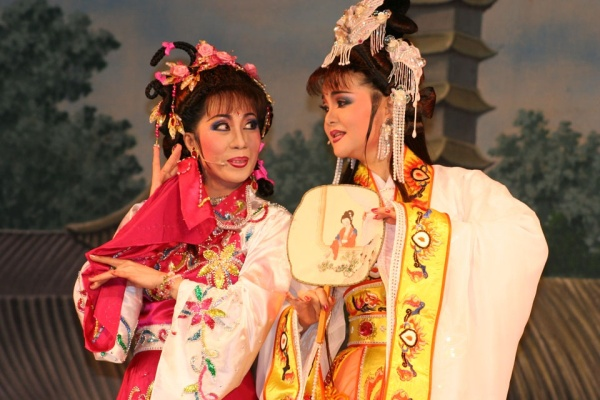
The same characters in Taiwanese opera, except Liu Yuyan is called Liu Yueying

Peach Flower Village (Chinese: 桃花村), also known as Flower Field Mistakes (Chinese: 花田錯), is a Chinese opera comedy. It is a spin-off of a story in Chapter 5 of the 14th-century novel Water Margin, and involves a few Water Margin heroes like Zhou Tong and Lu Zhishen.

== Story ==
At Peach Flower Village lives a squire named Liu Deming. One spring day, his young daughter Liu Yuyan (Liu Yueying in some versions) and her maid Chunlan attend a Flower Field Festival and meet the young scholar Bian Ji, who sells calligraphy. It is love at first sight for Yuyan and Bian Ji. Yuyan's enthusiastic maid Chunlan helps match them and reports this to Squire Liu, who sends an incompetent servant to deliver a marriage proposal to Bian Ji. However, the letter is mistakenly delivered to Zhou Tong, a bully nicknamed "Little Conqueror" and a bandit at Peach Flower Mountain. Zhou Tong then struts into Squire Liu's house with the letter and demands to marry Yuyan. The Lius are all terrified.

Chunlan goes out to inform Bian Ji that he must come to the Liu residence quickly. However, the only way he could sneak into the house and meet Yuyan undetected is to dress as a woman. Bian Ji arrives shortly before Zhou Tong, who comes to "snatch his bride". Instead, Zhou Tong kidnaps Bian Ji, whom he believes is Yuyan, and does not realize his mistake until he has returned to his foothold.

The travelling monk Lu Zhishen learns about the Lius' problem and decides to help. Anticipating another return from Zhou Tong, he disguises himself as Yuyan by wearing Yuyan's clothes and hiding in the bedroom. He ambushes Zhou Tong in the dark and beats him up. Zhou Tong flees back to Peach Flower Mountain but later returns again, this time with his sworn brother Li Zhong, who is a better fighter, to take revenge against Lu Zhishen. However, Li Zhong is surprised to see Lu Zhishen, whom he met and befriended in Wei Prefecture. The conflict is resolved when Li Zhong manages to convince Zhou Tong to give up on Yuyan, who happily marries Bian Ji with Lu Zhishen acting as the go-between.

== Adaptation ==
The play was adapted into a 1962 Shaw Brothers Studio film titled Bride-Napping starring Betty Loh Ti as Chunlan.
