= Shi Jin =

Fictional character in the Chinese classical novel Water Margin

- Water Margin character
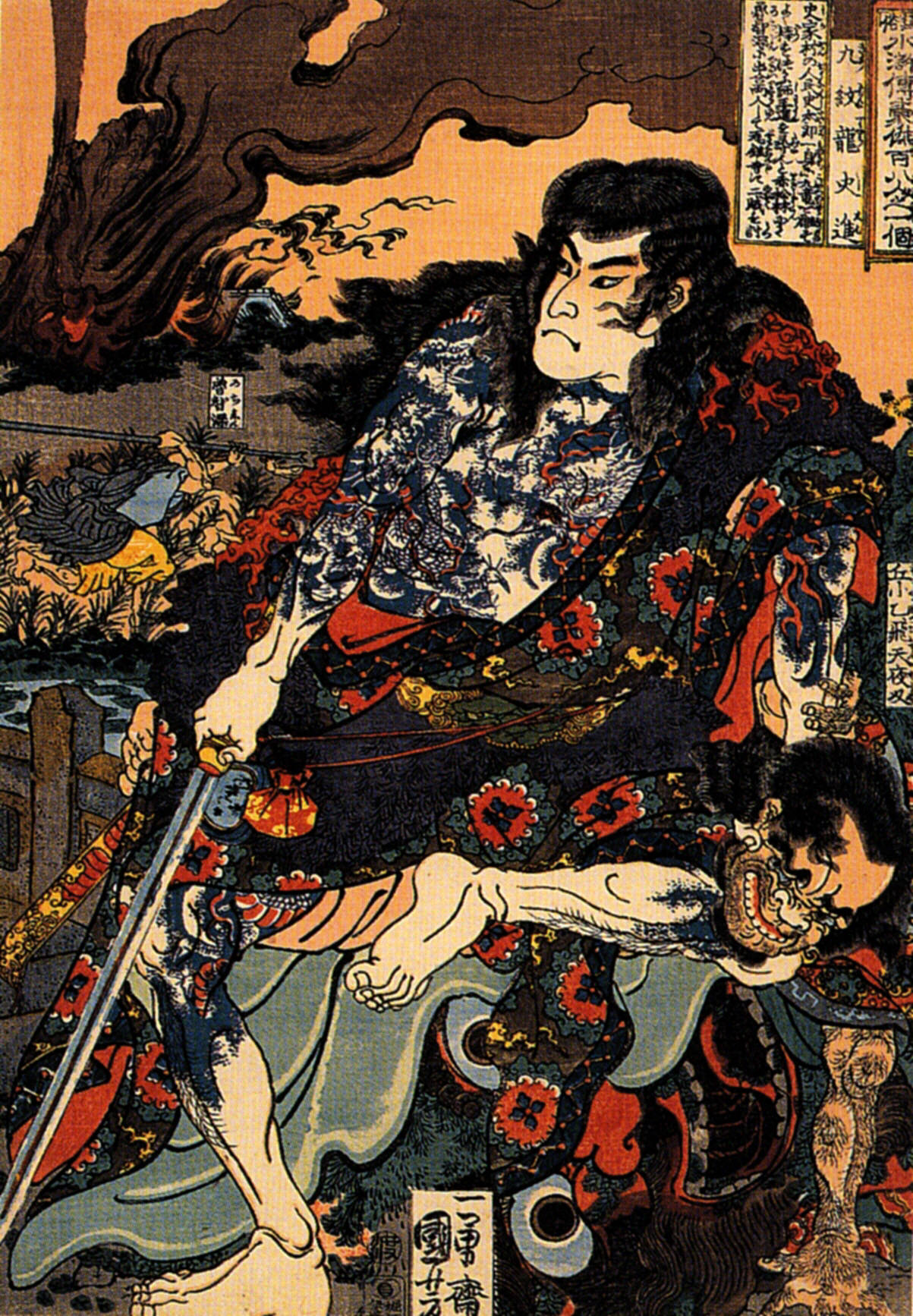
- an illustration of Shi Jin by Utagawa Kuniyoshi
- First appearance: Chapter 2

In-universe information
- Nicknames: "Nine Tattooed Dragons" 九紋龍
- Weapon: staff, podao
- Origin: village headman
- Designation: Tiger Cub Vanguard Commander of Liangshan
- Rank: 23rd, Minute Star (天微星) of the 36 Heavenly Spirits
- Ancestral home / Place of origin: Huayin County, Shaanxi

Chinese names
- Simplified Chinese: 史进
- Traditional Chinese: 史進
- Pinyin: Shǐ Jìn
- Wade–Giles: Shih Chin

Shi Jin is a fictional character in Water Margin, one of the Classic Chinese Novels. Nicknamed "Nine Tattooed Dragons", he ranks 23rd among the 36 Heavenly Spirits, the first third of the 108 Heroes.

== Historical basis ==
According to Nankai University professor Ning Jiayu, one theory suggests that Shi Jin was inspired by the historical figure Shi Bin, a rebel leader from Shanxi who lived in the early 13th century and joined Song Jiang in his rebellion against the Song dynasty. Gong Kai's "Praise of the 36 Men of Song Jiang" contains a poem mentioning Shi Jin: "Nine Tattooed Dragons Shi Jin; the dragon corresponds to nine; you bear nine tattoos."

== Background ==
Shi Jin is the first of the 108 Heroes to be introduced in the novel. The only child of Squire Shi, the headman of the Shi Family Village in Huayin County (in present-day Shaanxi), he is very passionate about martial arts since childhood. His father keeps looking for better instructors to train him. To enhance his appearance, he even has nine dragons tattooed on his body, earning himself the nickname "Nine Tattooed Dragons".

== Meeting Wang Jin ==
Shi Jin makes his first appearance in the novel when he is practising staff drills in the courtyard. Wang Jin, a former martial arts instructor of the imperial guards in the capital Dongjing (東京; present-day Kaifeng, Henan), is temporarily staying in the Shi residence with his mother at the time when he chances upon Shi Jin's practice.

Unimpressed with Shi Jin's skill, Wang Jin makes a frank remark, prompting the headstrong young man to challenge him to a fight. Wang Jin accepts the challenge and easily beats Shi Jin, who is humbled and apologises for his rudeness. Shi Jin then requests that Wang Jin take him as his student.

Wang Jin guides Shi Jin in martial arts for some time before leaving with his mother to continue their journey. Shi Jin later becomes the headman of the village after his father dies.

== Becoming an outlaw ==
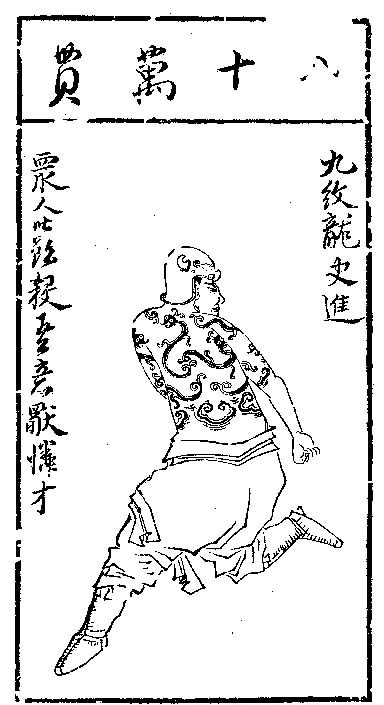
An illustration of Shi Jin by Chen Hongshou

Shi Jin becomes acquainted with the outlaw band at Mount Shaohua (少華山; southeast of present-day Hua County, Shaanxi) after capturing Chen Da, one of their three leaders, when they pass by the Shi Family Village en route to raiding Huayin County. The other two, Zhu Wu and Yang Chun, know that they cannot beat Shi Jin in a fight so they come to beg him to free Chen Da, whom they have sworn an oath of brotherhood with. Shi Jin, moved by their loyalty to their sworn brother, releases Chen Da and becomes friends with the three leaders. They often exchange gifts and take turns to host each other.

One day, a hunter finds a letter sent to Shi Jin by the outlaws, and reports it to the authorities. Hoping to capture the outlaws, the authorities send soldiers to surround the Shi Family Village when Shi Jin is hosting a feast for the three outlaw leaders. When the three leaders advise Shi Jin to turn them in so that he will not be implicated, Shi Jin refuses and sides with the outlaws instead. He joins them in fighting their way out after setting fire to the village. After they have safely retreated to their stronghold on Mount Shaohua, the trio invites Shi Jin to be the outlaw band's chief but he declines and leaves for Weizhou (渭州; around present-day Pingliang, Gansu) to find his master, Wang Jin.

In Weizhou, Shi Jin meets and befriends Lu Da, a local military officer, and reconnects with Li Zhong, his very first martial arts instructor. Later, he bumps into Lu Da again, who has become a Buddhist monk called Lu Zhishen. Together, Shi Jin and Lu Zhishen defeat and kill two villains in disguise as religious men and save the victims.

== Joining Liangshan ==
Shi Jin later returns to Mount Shaohua to find his outlaw friends and accept their offer to be the outlaw band's chief. One day, he learns that Prefect He, the governor of Huazhou, has abducted a painter's daughter to force her to be his concubine, and decides to intervene. While sneaking into the governor's residence to save the woman, he falls into a trap and gets captured.

Around the time, Lu Zhishen, who has joined the outlaw band at Liangshan Marsh, has travelled to Mount Shaohua to find Shi Jin and invite him to join Liangshan. Upon learning of what happened, he infiltrates Huazhou alone in an attempt to rescue Shi Jin, but ends up being lured into an ambush and gets taken captive as well.

The Mount Shaohua outlaws turn to their Liangshan counterparts for assistance, so the Liangshan outlaws travel to Huazhou, where they disguise themselves as officials sent by the emperor. Prefect He falls for the ruse and comes out of the city to welcome the "officials", who then reveal their true identities and kill him. The outlaws then break into Huazhou and rescue Shi Jin and Lu Zhishen, after which Shi Jin and the Mount Shaohua outlaws decide to join the larger outlaw band at Liangshan.

When the Liangshan outlaws are attacking Dongping Prefecture (東平府; present-day Dongping County, Shandong), Shi Jin volunteers to infiltrate the city and serve as a spy for the outlaws. He stays with a prostitute whom he has patronised before, but the brothel owner secretly reports him to the authorities and he ends up being ambushed and taken prisoner. He is only freed after the outlaws capture the city.

== Campaigns and death ==
Shi Jin is appointed as one of the eight Tiger Cub Vanguard Commanders of the Liangshan cavalry after the 108 Heroes are fully assembled. He participates in the campaigns against the Liao invaders and rebels in Song territory after the outlaws receive amnesty from Emperor Huizong.

During the final campaign against Fang La's rebel forces, Shi Jin slays an enemy warrior, Shen Gang, when the Liangshan forces are attacking Runzhou (潤州; present-day Runzhou District, Zhenjiang, Jiangsu). Later, he and five other Liangshan heroes (Shi Xiu, Chen Da, Yang Chun, Li Zhong and Xue Yong) are assigned to assault Yuling Pass (昱嶺關; near present-day Zhupu Village, She County, Anhui), which is guarded by Pang Wanchun. Pang Wanchun kills Shi Jin with a single arrow shot, while his archers rain arrows on the other five and kill them all.

== See also ==
- List of Water Margin minor characters#Shi Jin's story for a list of supporting minor characters from Shi Jin's story.
