= Hu Sanniang =

Fictional character in the Chinese classical novel Water Margin

- Water Margin character
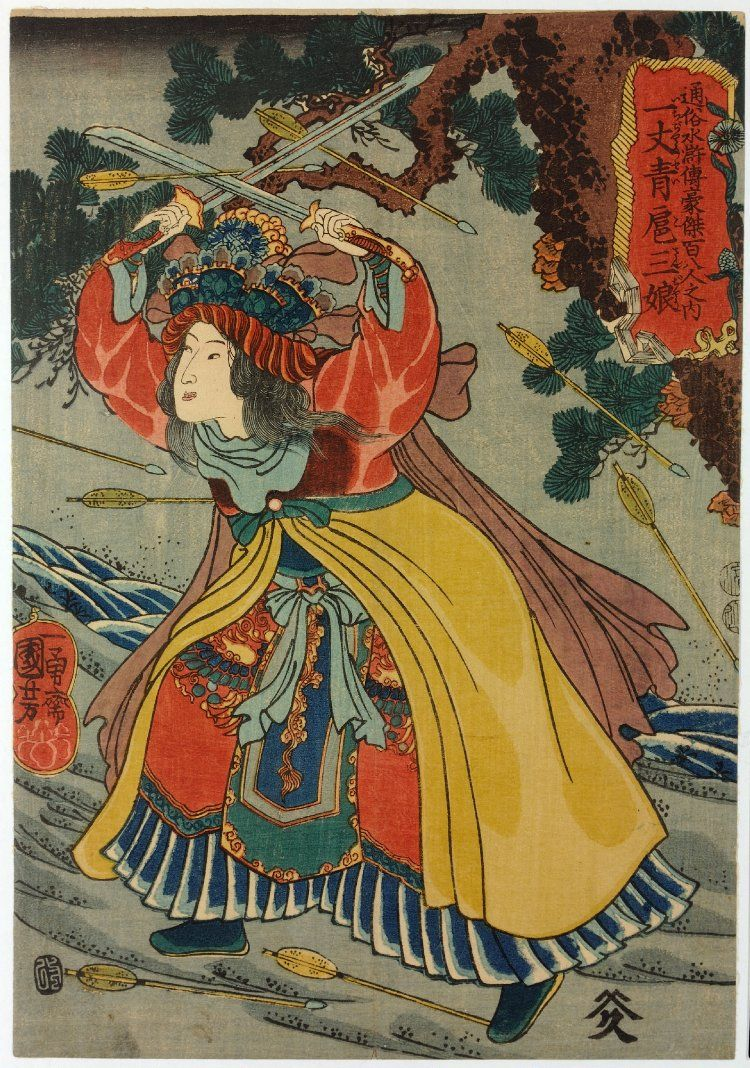
- an illustration of Hu Sanniang by Utagawa Kuniyoshi
- First appearance: Chapter 47

In-universe information
- Nickname: "One Zhang of Blue" 一丈青
- Weapon: pair of sabres, lasso
- Origin: scion
- Designation: Cavalry Commander of Liangshan
- Rank: 59th, Bright Star (地慧星) of the 72 Earthly Fiends
- Ancestral home / Place of origin: Yunzhou, Zhongshan Prefecture (around present-day Dongping County, Shandong)

Chinese names
- Simplified Chinese: 扈三娘
- Traditional Chinese: 扈三娘
- Pinyin: Hù Sānniáng
- Wade–Giles: Hu San-niang

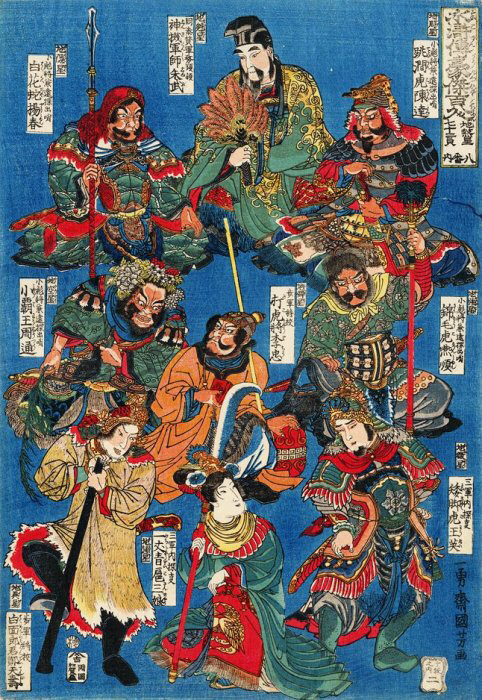
An illustration of nine of the 108 Heroes by Utagawa Kuniyoshi. Li Zhong is in the centre. The rest are (clockwise from top): Zhu Wu, Chen Da, Yan Shun, Wang Ying, Hu Sanniang, Zheng Tianshou, Zhou Tong, and Yang Chun.

Hu Sanniang, literally "Third Sister Hu", is a fictional character in Water Margin, one of the Classic Chinese Novels. Nicknamed "One Zhang of Blue", she ranks 59th among the 108 Heroes and 23rd among the 72 Earthly Fiends.

== Background ==
Hu Sanniang is the daughter of Squire Hu, the headman of the Hu Family Village at Lone Dragon Ridge (獨龍崗) in Yunzhou (around present-day Dongping County, Shandong). The ridge is also home to the Li Family Village headed by Li Ying, and the Zhu Family Village led by the three Zhu brothers and their father.

A highly-skilled warrior nicknamed "One Zhang of Blue", Hu Sanniang wields a pair of sabres and is capable of taking on dozens of enemies at the same time. She is also an expert at using the lasso, which she uses to catch her opponents by surprise and pull them off horseback. In battle, she dons a suit of armour over a red robe, a silk belt, and a golden helmet.

== Fighting the Liangshan outlaws ==
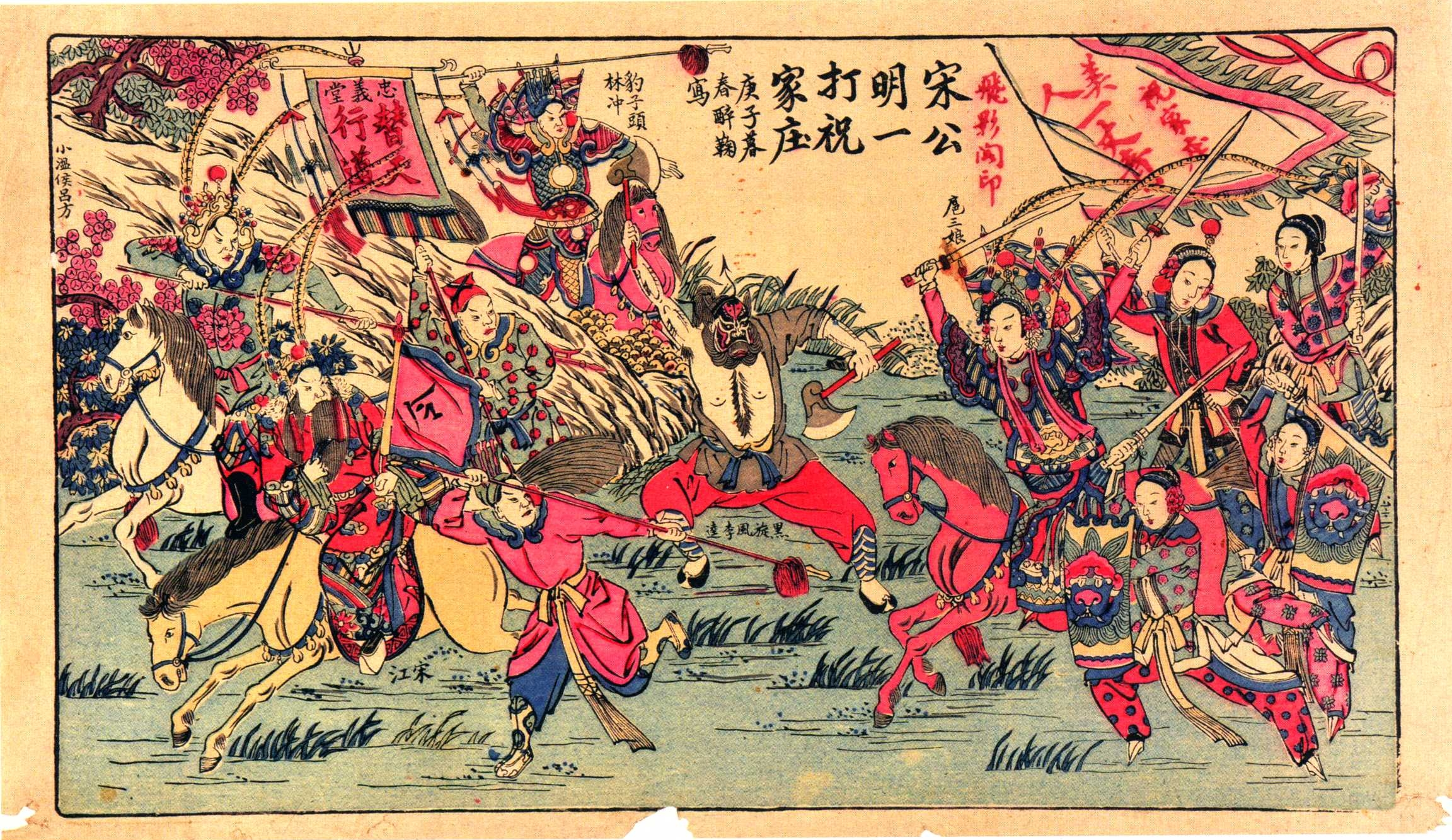
"Song Gongming's First Attack on the Zhu Family Village", woodblock print, 1900, Shanghai History Museum

Hu Sanniang is initially engaged to Zhu Biao, the youngest of the three Zhu brothers. The Zhus have been very hostile towards the outlaws at Liangshan Marsh, and have captured Shi Qian after he stole a rooster from a tavern in their village. Li Ying, the Zhus' neighbour, has apologised on Shi Qian's behalf and kindly requested that the Zhus release Shi Qian, but the Zhus have attacked and wounded him for no reason. Upon careful consideration, the Liangshan outlaws, under Song Jiang's leadership, mobilise their forces to attack the Zhu Family Village.

After the outlaws are unsuccessful at their first assault on the village, the Zhus turn to their other neighbour, the Hu family, for help in fighting the outlaws. When Hu Sanniang appears on horseback at the frontline and challenges the outlaws to a one-on-one duel, Wang Ying, who is aroused at the sight of a pretty female warrior and thinking she will be easy to defeat, takes up the challenge. However, he underestimates Hu Sanniang and ends up being pulled off horseback and captured by the enemy.

Hu Sanniang shows no signs of weariness as she continues to duel Ou Peng and Ma Lin consecutively. The Liangshan outlaws are thrown into disarray and start retreating. During this time, Hu Sanniang pursues Song Jiang on horseback in an attempt to capture the outlaw commander. Just as she is gaining on him, Lin Chong appears and blocks her way. She fights Lin Chong but is no match for him and ends up being taken captive. Song Jiang then sends Hu Sanniang back to Liangshan, where she is placed under his father's care.

== Fall of the Hu family ==
Hu Sanniang's brother, Hu Cheng, comes to meet and plead with Song Jiang to release his sister. Song Jiang agrees on the conditions that the Hus stay out of the conflict, and that Hu Cheng captures any of the Zhus and hands him over to Liangshan in exchange for Hu Sanniang.

On their third assault, the outlaws defeat the Zhus and overrun the village with help from a group of spies they sent in earlier. Zhu Biao, the youngest of the Zhu brothers, flees to the Hu Family Village, where he is tied up by Hu Cheng and sent to the Liangshan camp.

En route, they encounter Liangshan's Li Kui, who kills Zhu Biao while Hu Cheng flees. Li Kui, seeing the Hus as enemies for helping the Zhus fight the Liangshan outlaws earlier, breaks into the Hu Family Village and slaughters everyone in there. Later, he is severely reprimanded by Song Jiang for indiscriminately killing all the villagers.

== Becoming an outlaw ==
Back in Liangshan, Song Jiang manages to convince Hu Sanniang, who has become his father's goddaughter, to join the outlaw band and the Liangshan cause of "upholding justice on Heaven's behalf". Song Jiang also arranges for Hu Sanniang to marry Wang Ying to fulfil an earlier promise to help Wang Ying find a wife.

During her time in Liangshan, Hu Sanniang makes several contributions in the battles against the outlaws' enemies, including government forces. At one point, she defeats and captures the military officer Peng Qi, who later surrenders and joins Liangshan.

== Campaigns and death ==
Hu Sanniang is appointed as a commander of the Liangshan cavalry overseeing reconnaissance-related matters after the 108 Heroes are fully assembled. She participates in the campaigns against the Liao invaders and rebel forces in Song territory after the outlaws receive amnesty from Emperor Huizong.

During the final campaign against Fang La's rebel forces, Hu Sanniang and Wang Ying are assigned to attack Muzhou (睦州; in present-day Hangzhou, Zhejiang). In the midst of battle, they encounter the enemy warrior Zheng Biao, who uses sorcery to disorient and kill Wang Ying. Eager to avenge her husband, Hu Sanniang fights Zheng Biao, but eventually gets killed by his projectile weapons.

When the campaign is over, the emperor awards Hu Sanniang the posthumous title "Lady of Huayang Commandery" (花陽郡夫人) to honour her for her contributions during the campaigns.
