= Li Zhong (Water Margin) =

Fictional character in the Chinese classical novel Water Margin

- Water Margin character
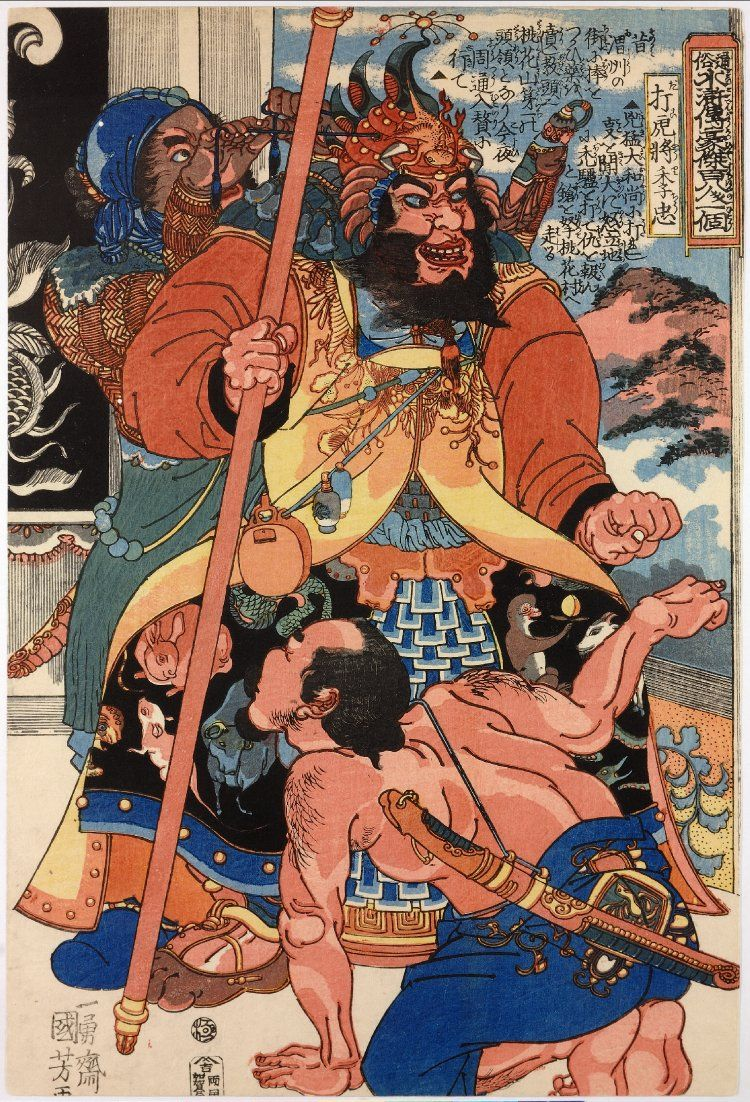
- an illustration of Li Zhong by Utagawa Kuniyoshi
- First appearance: Chapter 3

In-universe information
- Nickname: "Tiger-slaying General" 打虎將
- Weapon: staff
- Origin: medicine peddler
- Designation: Infantry Commander of Liangshan
- Rank: 86th, Remote Star (地僻星) of the 72 Earthly Fiends
- Ancestral home / Place of origin: Haozhou (around present-day Chuzhou, Anhui)

Chinese names
- Simplified Chinese: 李忠
- Traditional Chinese: 李忠
- Pinyin: Lǐ Zhōng
- Wade–Giles: Li Chung

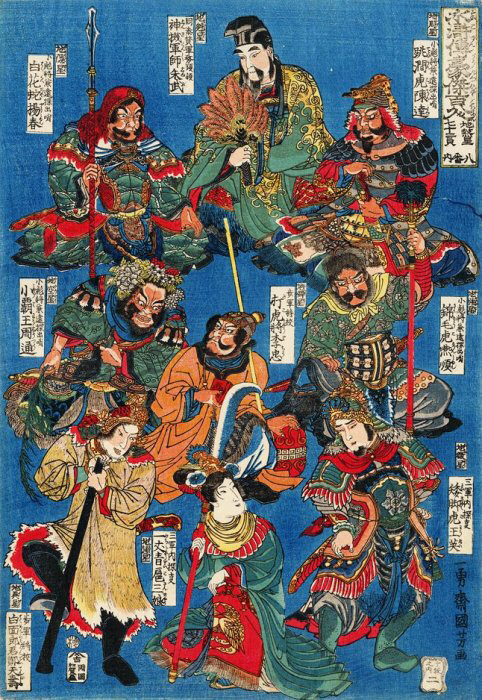
An illustration of nine of the 108 Heroes by Utagawa Kuniyoshi. Li Zhong is in the centre. The rest are (clockwise from top): Zhu Wu, Chen Da, Yan Shun, Wang Ying, Hu Sanniang, Zheng Tianshou, Zhou Tong, and Yang Chun.

Li Zhong is a fictional character in Water Margin, one of the Classic Chinese Novels. Nicknamed "Tiger-slaying General", he ranks 86th among the 108 Heroes and 50th among the 72 Earthly Fiends.

== Background ==
Originally from Haozhou (濠州; around present-day Chuzhou, Anhui), Li Zhong is nicknamed "Tiger-slaying General" for his muscular build. He roams from place to place, making a living by performing martial arts or physical feats on the streets to promote the medicine and health supplements he sells.

At one point, Li Zhong introduces Shi Jin, a village headman's son, to martial arts and becomes his very first martial arts instructor.

== Becoming an outlaw ==
Li Zhong later reconnects with Shi Jin in Weizhou (渭州; around present-day Pingliang, Gansu), where they also befriend Lu Da, a local military officer.

After leaving Weizhou, Li Zhong passes by Mount Peach Blossom (桃花山), where he encounters the outlaw Zhou Tong and his band. Zhou Tong attempts to rob him, but he defeats and impresses Zhou, who invites him to be the outlaw band's new leader. Li Zhong accepts, while Zhou Tong takes the second leadership position.

== Encounter with Lu Zhishen ==
Zhou Tong later runs into trouble when he tries to force the daughter of a nearby manor's owner to marry him. When he shows up in the manor on the wedding night, he is ambushed and beaten up in the bridal room by a Buddhist monk.

Fleeing back to his stronghold, he tells Li Zhong about what happened, and the two outlaw chiefs lead their men to the manor to confront the assailant.

To Li Zhong's surprise, the monk turns out to be Lu Da, who is now known as Lu Zhishen. Caught in an awkward situation, Li Zhong is forced to give face to Lu Zhishen, so he tells Zhou Tong to give up on the marriage. Zhou Tong reluctantly agrees and makes peace with Lu Zhishen. Li Zhong and Zhou Tong then invite Lu Zhishen back to their stronghold and host him for a short while before he leaves to continue his journey to the capital.

== Joining Liangshan ==
Li Zhong and Zhou Tong appear in the novel again in a later chapter when the outlaws from Liangshan Marsh are battling government forces in Qingzhou (around present-day Qingzhou, Shandong).

At the time, Zhou Tong has stolen the tixue wuzhui (踢雪烏騅), a black stallion awarded as a steed by Emperor Huizong to the general Huyan Zhuo. Huyan Zhuo, who has just been defeated in battle by the Liangshan outlaws, has fled to Qingzhou, where he hopes to redeem himself by helping the governor Murong Yanda get rid of outlaw groups within Qingzhou.

Murong Yanda sends Huyan Zhuo to lead troops to attack the outlaws at Mount Peach Blossom. Li Zhong and Zhou Tong face Huyan Zhuo in battle but are no match for him and are forced to retreat. Eventually, the Liangshan outlaws show up, lure Huyan Zhuo into an ambush, and capture him. Huyan Zhuo surrenders and joins the outlaws. After the battle, the outlaws from Mount Peach Blossom, along with their two leaders, become part of the larger outlaw band at Liangshan Marsh.

== Campaigns and death ==
Li Zhong is appointed as a commander of the Liangshan infantry after the 108 Heroes are fully assembled. He participates in the campaigns against the Liao invaders and rebel forces in Song territory after the outlaws receive amnesty from Emperor Huizong.

During the final campaign against Fang La's rebel forces, Li Zhong and five other Liangshan heroes (Shi Jin, Shi Xiu, Chen Da, Yang Chun and Xue Yong) are assigned to assault Yuling Pass (昱嶺關; near present-day Zhupu Village, She County, Anhui), which is guarded by Pang Wanchun. Pang Wanchun kills Shi Jin with a single arrow shot, while his archers rain arrows on Li Zhong and the other four, killing them all.
