= Yan Shun =

Fictional character in the Chinese classical novel Water Margin

- Water Margin character
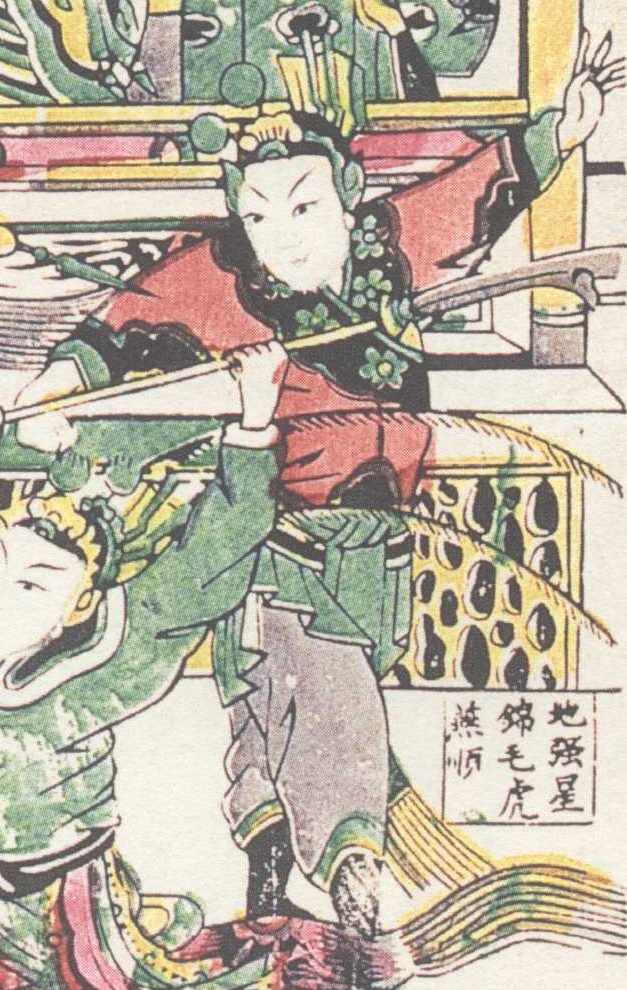
- a Qing dynasty illustration of Yan Shun
- First appearance: Chapter 32

In-universe information
- Nickname: "Multicoloured Tiger" 錦毛虎
- Weapon: sabre
- Origin: outlaw
- Designation: Tiger Cub Patrol Commander of Liangshan
- Rank: 50th, Strong Star (地強星) of the 72 Earthly Fiends
- Ancestral home / Place of origin: Laizhou (around present-day Yantai, Shandong)

Chinese names
- Simplified Chinese: 燕顺
- Traditional Chinese: 燕順
- Pinyin: Yàn Shùn
- Wade–Giles: Yen Shun

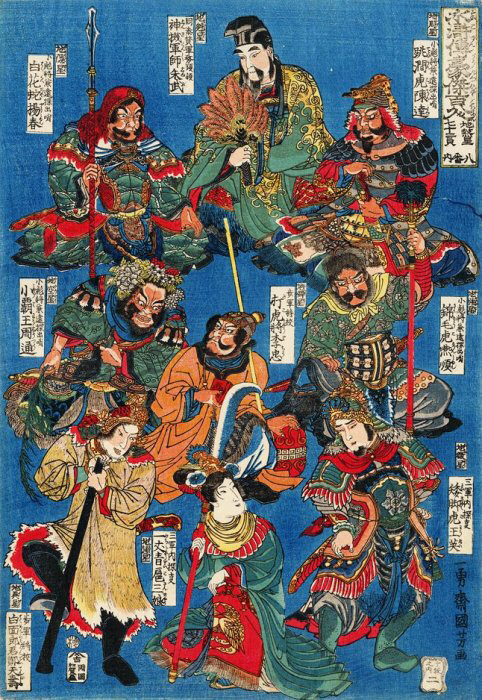
An illustration of nine of the 108 Heroes by Utagawa Kuniyoshi. Li Zhong is in the centre. The rest are (clockwise from top): Zhu Wu, Chen Da, Yan Shun, Wang Ying, Hu Sanniang, Zheng Tianshou, Zhou Tong, and Yang Chun.

Yan Shun is a fictional character in Water Margin, one of the Classic Chinese Novels. Nicknamed "Multicoloured Tiger", he ranks 50th among the 108 Heroes and 14th among the 72 Earthly Fiends.

== Background ==
The novel describes Yan Shun, who is nicknamed "Multicoloured Tiger", as a man with reddish-brown hair, a yellowish beard, round eyes, long arms, and a wide waist. A highly-skilled fighter, he specialises in using the sabre.

Originally a trader from Laizhou (萊州; around present-day Yantai, Shandong), he became the chief of an outlaw band at Mount Qingfeng (清風山; in present-day Qingzhou, Shandong). Later, he recruited Wang Ying and Zheng Tianshou, who respectively took the second and third positions of leadership in the band after him.

== Meeting Song Jiang ==
Yan Shun, along with Wang Ying and Zheng Tianshou, is first introduced in the novel when their followers capture Song Jiang, who is passing by Mount Qingfeng on his way to Qingfeng Fort (清風寨; in present-day Qingzhou, Shandong) to join his friend, Hua Rong. Just as the outlaws are planning to slaughter him and use his heart to make soup, Song Jiang laments loudly, "Am I, Song Jiang, destined to die just like this?" Surprised at hearing the name "Song Jiang", Yan Shun immediately stops his followers and asks Song Jiang about what he just said. Upon confirming that the man they captured is indeed Song Jiang from Yuncheng County, the three outlaw chiefs instantly release him, apologise to him, and introduce themselves. It turns out that they have long admired Song Jiang after hearing of his reputation for chivalry and generosity, so they treat him as an honoured guest at their stronghold.

Halfway during the feast, Wang Ying hears of a passing convoy carrying a woman in a sedan chair, so he leaves to intercept the convoy and captures the woman. Finding her attractive, he takes her back to the stronghold and attempts to rape her. He is interrupted by Song Jiang, who learns from the woman that she is the wife of Liu Gao, the official in charge of Qingfeng Fort. As Song Jiang still intends to head to Qingfeng Fort to join Hua Rong, he wishes to avoid trouble with Liu Gao later, so he tries to convince Wang Ying to release Liu Gao's wife. Wang Ying, giving face to Song Jiang, reluctantly agrees.

== Battle of Qingfeng Fort ==
Song Jiang later leaves Mount Qingfeng and heads to Qingfeng Fort, where he stays with Hua Rong. During the Lantern Festival, he is recognised by Liu Gao's wife while enjoying the festivities outdoors. Liu Gao's wife accuses Song Jiang of being the outlaw who kidnapped and attempted to rape her, so Liu Gao orders Song Jiang's arrest. Hua Rong intervenes and frees Song Jiang by force, prompting Liu Gao to seek help from his superior Murong Yanda, the governor of Qingzhou (青州; in present-day Shandong). Murong Yanda sends the military officer Huang Xin to Qingfeng Fort, where Huang Xin, pretending to mediate the conflict, lures Hua Rong into a trap and captures him. Meanwhile, Liu Gao and his men arrest Song Jiang again when he tries to sneak out of Qingfeng Fort.

Huang Xin and Liu Gao then escort Song Jiang and Hua Rong as prisoners back to Qingzhou. En route, the convoy is ambushed by the Mount Qingfeng outlaws, who kill Liu Gao and free the two men; Huang Xin escapes back to the fort. Murong Yanda sends Qin Ming to lead government forces to deal with the Mount Qingfeng outlaws, but Qin Ming ultimately ends up joining the outlaws. He then heads to Qingfeng Fort and convinces Huang Xin, his apprentice, to surrender and join the outlaws too.

After the outlaws take over Qingfeng Fort, Wang Ying finds Liu Gao's wife again and tries to force her to marry him. However, Yan Shun steps in and kills her in revenge for what she did to Song Jiang. Wang Ying, infuriated by Yan Shun's action, threatens to sever ties with him. Song Jiang calms Wang Ying down and appeases him by promising to help him find a wife in the future. The whole lot then leave Mount Qingfeng and head to Liangshan Marsh to join the larger outlaw band there.

== Campaigns and death ==
Yan Shun is appointed as a Tiger Cub Patrol Commander of the Liangshan cavalry after the 108 Heroes are fully assembled. He participates in the campaigns against the Liao invaders and rebel forces in Song territory after the outlaws receive amnesty from Emperor Huizong.

During the final campaign against Fang La's rebel forces, Yan Shun is assigned to attack Black Dragon Ridge (烏龍嶺; northeast of present-day Meicheng Town, Jiande, Zhejiang). He faces the enemy warrior Shi Bao, who has just killed Liangshan's Ma Lin. Eager to avenge his fallen comrade, Yan Shun fights Shi Bao. He is killed when Shi Bao throws his meteor hammer at him.
