= Wang Ying (Water Margin) =

Fictional character in the Chinese classical novel Water Margin

- Water Margin character
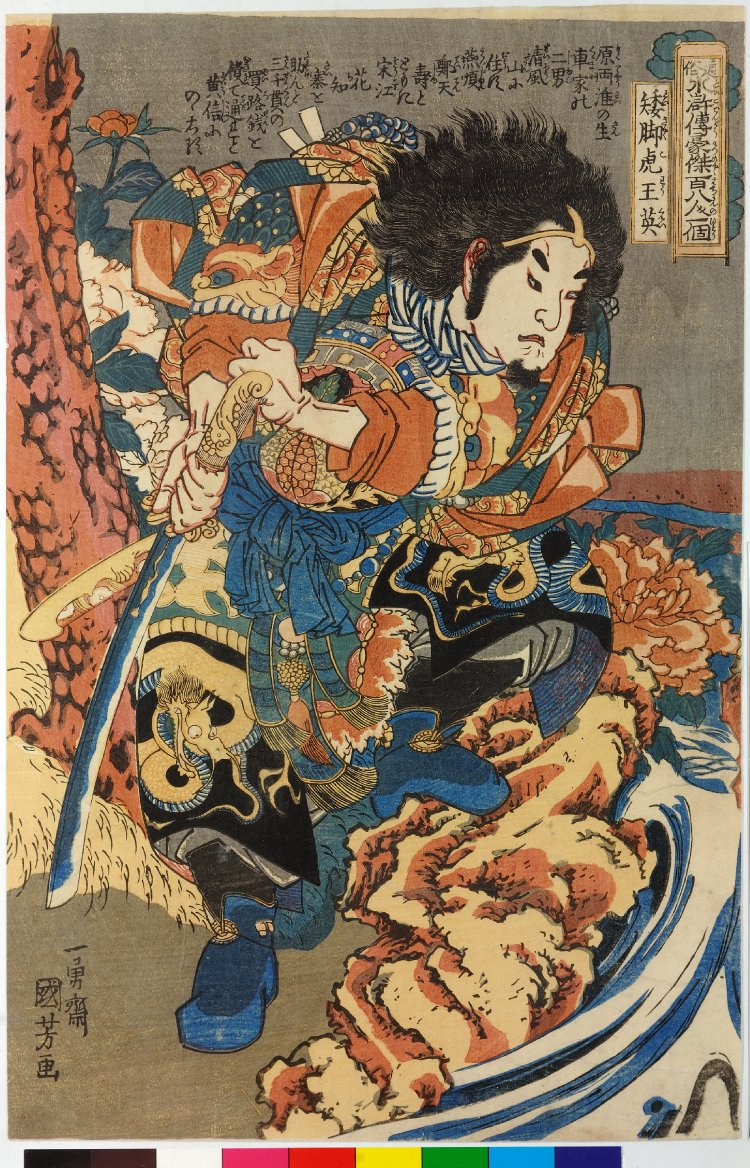
- an illustration of Wang Ying by Utagawa Kuniyoshi
- First appearance: Chapter 31

In-universe information
- Nickname: "Stumpy Tiger" 矮腳虎
- Origin: outlaw
- Designation: Cavalry Commander of Liangshan
- Rank: 58th, Minute Star (地微星) of the 72 Earthly Fiends
- Ancestral home / Place of origin: Huai River region

Chinese names
- Simplified Chinese: 王英
- Traditional Chinese: 王英
- Pinyin: Wáng Yīng
- Wade–Giles: Wang Ying

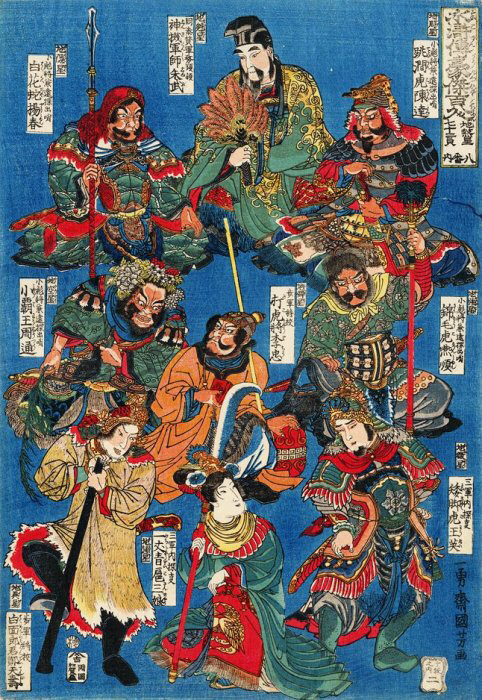
An illustration of nine of the 108 Heroes by Utagawa Kuniyoshi. Li Zhong is in the centre. The rest are (clockwise from top): Zhu Wu, Chen Da, Yan Shun, Wang Ying, Hu Sanniang, Zheng Tianshou, Zhou Tong, and Yang Chun.

Wang Ying is a fictional character in Water Margin, one of the Classic Chinese Novels. Nicknamed "Stumpy Tiger", he ranks 58th among the 108 Heroes and 22nd among the 72 Earthly Fiends.

== Background ==
The novel describes Wang Ying as a short man with sparkling eyes. A highly-skilled fighter, he is nicknamed "Stumpy Tiger" for his height. Originally a coachman from the Huai River region, he was overcome by greed one day and decided to rob his passengers. Although he was arrested and imprisoned, he managed to escape and join an outlaw band at Mount Qingfeng (清風山; in present-day Qingzhou, Shandong) led by Yan Shun. He takes the second position of leadership between Yan Shun and Zheng Tianshou, who later joined the band.

== Meeting Song Jiang ==
Wang Ying, along with Yan Shun and Zheng Tianshou, is first introduced in the novel when their followers capture Song Jiang, who is passing by Mount Qingfeng on his way to Qingfeng Fort (清風寨; in present-day Qingzhou, Shandong) to join his friend, Hua Rong. Just as the outlaws are planning to slaughter him and use his heart to make soup, Song Jiang laments loudly, "Am I, Song Jiang, destined to die just like this?" Surprised at hearing the name "Song Jiang", Yan Shun immediately stops his followers and asks Song Jiang about what he just said. Upon confirming that the man they captured is indeed Song Jiang from Yuncheng County, the three outlaw chiefs instantly release him, apologise to him, and introduce themselves. It turns out that they have long admired Song Jiang after hearing of his reputation for chivalry and generosity, so they treat him as an honoured guest at their stronghold.

Halfway during the feast, Wang Ying hears of a passing convoy carrying a woman in a sedan chair, so he leaves to intercept the convoy and captures the woman. Finding her attractive, he takes her back to the stronghold and attempts to rape her. He is interrupted by Song Jiang, who learns from the woman that she is the wife of Liu Gao, the official in charge of Qingfeng Fort. As Song Jiang still intends to head to Qingfeng Fort to join Hua Rong, he wishes to avoid trouble with Liu Gao later, so he tries to convince Wang Ying to release Liu Gao's wife. Wang Ying, giving face to Song Jiang, reluctantly agrees.

== Battle of Qingfeng Fort ==
Song Jiang later leaves Mount Qingfeng and heads to Qingfeng Fort, where he stays with Hua Rong. During the Lantern Festival, he is recognised by Liu Gao's wife while enjoying the festivities outdoors. Liu Gao's wife accuses Song Jiang of being the outlaw who kidnapped and attempted to rape her, so Liu Gao orders Song Jiang's arrest. Hua Rong intervenes and frees Song Jiang by force, prompting Liu Gao to seek help from his superior Murong Yanda, the governor of Qingzhou (青州; in present-day Shandong). Murong Yanda sends the military officer Huang Xin to Qingfeng Fort, where Huang Xin, pretending to mediate the conflict, lures Hua Rong into a trap and captures him. Meanwhile, Liu Gao and his men arrest Song Jiang again when he tries to sneak out of Qingfeng Fort.

Huang Xin and Liu Gao then escort Song Jiang and Hua Rong as prisoners back to Qingzhou. En route, the convoy is ambushed by the Mount Qingfeng outlaws, who kill Liu Gao and free the two men; Huang Xin escapes back to the fort. Murong Yanda sends Qin Ming to lead government forces to deal with the Mount Qingfeng outlaws, but Qin Ming ultimately ends up joining the outlaws. He then heads to Qingfeng Fort and convinces Huang Xin, his apprentice, to surrender and join the outlaws too.

After the outlaws take over Qingfeng Fort, Wang Ying finds Liu Gao's wife again and tries to force her to marry him. However, Yan Shun steps in and kills her in revenge for what she did to Song Jiang. Wang Ying, infuriated by Yan Shun's action, threatens to sever ties with him. Song Jiang calms Wang Ying down and appeases him by promising to help him find a wife in the future. The whole lot then leave Mount Qingfeng and head to Liangshan Marsh to join the larger outlaw band there.

== Marrying Hu Sanniang ==
The Liangshan outlaws later get into a conflict with the Zhu Family Village at Lone Dragon Ridge (獨龍崗) in Yunzhou (around present-day Dongping County, Shandong), and mobilise their forces under Song Jiang's command to attack the fortified village. After the outlaws fail to breach the village's defences during their first assault, the Zhus turn to their neighbours at the Hu Family Village for help.

Hu Sanniang, the daughter of the Hu Family Village's headman and the fiancée of Zhu Biao, the youngest of the three Zhu brothers, volunteers to engage the Liangshan outlaws in battle. When she appears on horseback at the frontline and challenges the outlaws to a one-on-one duel, Wang Ying, who is aroused at the sight of a pretty female warrior and thinking she will be easy to defeat, takes up the challenge. However, he underestimates Hu Sanniang and ends up being pulled off horseback and captured by the enemy. Hu Sanniang is later defeated and captured by Liangshan's Lin Chong, and sent to Liangshan, where she is placed under the care of Song Jiang's father.

On their third assault, the outlaws manage to defeat the Zhus and overrun the village with the aid of a group of spies they have sent in earlier. Wang Ying and the other captured outlaws are then freed. To fulfil his earlier promise to help Wang Ying find a wife, Song Jiang arranges for Hu Sanniang – who has become his father's goddaughter – to marry Wang Ying.

== Campaigns and death ==
Wang Ying is appointed as a commander of the Liangshan cavalry overseeing reconnaissance-related matters after the 108 Heroes are fully assembled. He participates in the campaigns against the Liao invaders and rebel forces in Song territory after the outlaws receive amnesty from Emperor Huizong.

During the final campaign against Fang La's rebel forces, Wang Ying and Hu Sanniang are assigned to attack Muzhou (睦州; in present-day Hangzhou, Zhejiang). In the midst of battle, they encounter the enemy warrior Zheng Biao, who uses sorcery to disorient and kill Wang Ying. Eager to avenge her husband, Hu Sanniang fights Zheng Biao, but eventually gets killed by his projectile weapons.
