= Zhou Tong (Water Margin) =

Fictional character in the Chinese classical novel Water Margin

- Water Margin character
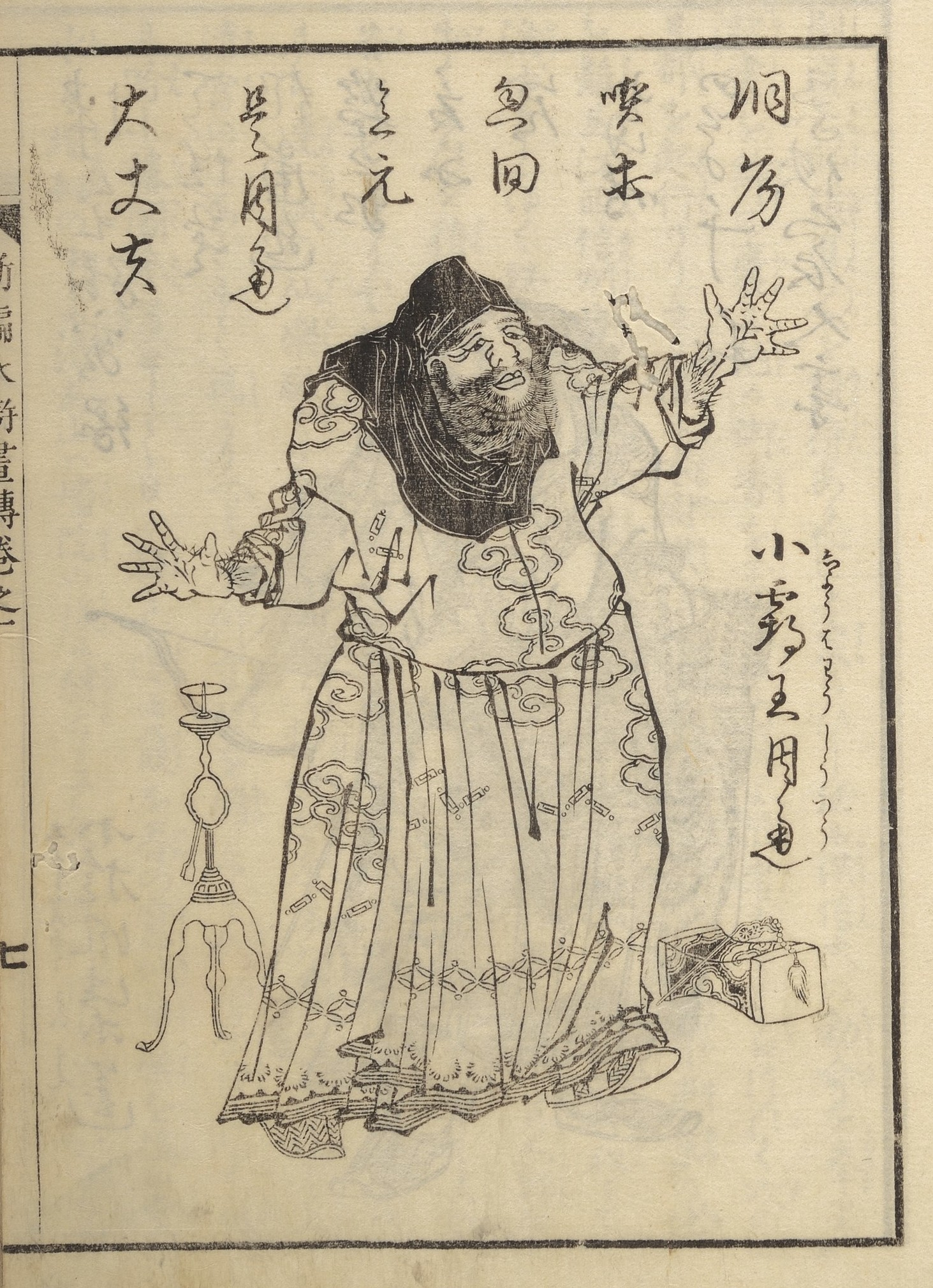
- a 19th-century illustration of Zhou Tong
- First appearance: Chapter 5

In-universe information
- Nickname: "Little Conqueror" 小覇王
- Weapon: shiny green metal alloy spear (走水綠沉槍)
- Origin: outlaw
- Designation: Tiger Cub Patrol Commander of Liangshan
- Rank: 87th, Empty Star (地空星) of the 72 Earthly Fiends
- Ancestral home / Place of origin: Qingzhou (in present-day Shandong)

Chinese names
- Simplified Chinese: 周通
- Traditional Chinese: 周通
- Pinyin: Zhōu Tōng
- Wade–Giles: Chou T'ung

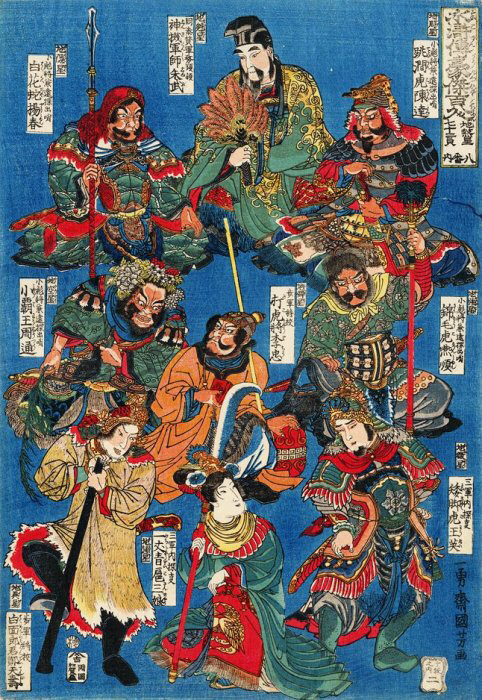
An illustration of nine of the 108 Heroes by Utagawa Kuniyoshi. Li Zhong is in the centre. The rest are (clockwise from top): Zhu Wu, Chen Da, Yan Shun, Wang Ying, Hu Sanniang, Zheng Tianshou, Zhou Tong, and Yang Chun.

Zhou Tong is a fictional character in Water Margin, one of the Classic Chinese Novels. Nicknamed "Little Conqueror", he ranks 87th among the 108 Heroes and 51st among the 72 Earthly Fiends.

There was a historical Zhou Tong, who lived around the 12th century, the same period Water Margin is set in. According to folklore, he taught archery to the general Yue Fei. (Note: The author incorrectly represents the archer Zhou Tong and this fictional Zhou Tong as the same person. See #6 on p. 4.) The given names of the two Zhou Tong are written differently in Chinese (通、同).

== Background ==
The novel describes Zhou Tong as a robustly built man with a broad face and a booming voice. A skilled fighter, he uses a shiny, green metal alloy spear in combat. He is nicknamed "Little Conqueror" as he resembles Xiang Yu in appearance and temperament.

Zhou Tong starts out as the leader of an outlaw band based at Mount Peach Blossom (桃花山) in Qingzhou (in present-day Shandong). One day, he attempts to rob a passing traveller, Li Zhong, but ends up being defeated by the latter. Impressed with Li Zhong's skill, he invites Li to be the outlaw band's leader. Li Zhong accepts, so Zhou Tong takes the second leadership position in the band.

== Encounter with Lu Zhishen ==
At one point, Zhou Tong is attracted to the daughter of Squire Liu, whose family lives in a manor near Mount Peach Blossom, and wants to marry her. The squire, though very reluctant to let his daughter marry Zhou Tong, is pressured into agreeing as he fears the outlaws.

On the wedding night, Zhou Tong comes to the manor dressed in a groom's outfit and receives an apparently warm welcome from the Liu family. After entering the bride's unlit room, he does not find his bride. Instead, he is ambushed and given a good beating by a burly Buddhist monk. The monk is Lu Zhishen, who happens to be spending the night at the manor and has promised to help Squire Liu deal with the outlaws after hearing of their plight.

Zhou Tong manages to escape and flee back to his stronghold, where he tells Li Zhong about what happened. The two outlaw chiefs then lead their men to the manor to confront the assailant.

To Li Zhong's surprise, Lu Zhishen is his old acquaintance Lu Da, who has become a Buddhist monk to avoid arrest after committing manslaughter. Caught in an awkward situation, Li Zhong is forced to give face to Lu Zhishen, so he tells Zhou Tong to give up on the marriage. Zhou Tong reluctantly agrees and makes peace with Lu Zhishen. Li Zhong and Zhou Tong then invite Lu Zhishen back to their stronghold and host him for a short while before he leaves to continue his journey to the capital.

== Joining Liangshan ==
Zhou Tong and Li Zhong appear in the novel again in a later chapter when the outlaws from Liangshan Marsh are battling government forces in Qingzhou (around present-day Qingzhou, Shandong).

At the time, Zhou Tong has stolen the tixue wuzhui (踢雪烏騅), a black stallion awarded as a steed by Emperor Huizong to the general Huyan Zhuo. Huyan Zhuo, who has just been defeated in battle by the Liangshan outlaws, has fled to Qingzhou, where he hopes to redeem himself by helping the governor Murong Yanda get rid of outlaw groups within Qingzhou.

Murong Yanda sends Huyan Zhuo to lead troops to attack the outlaws at Mount Peach Blossom. Zhou Tong and Li Zhong face Huyan Zhuo in battle but are no match for him and are forced to retreat. Eventually, the Liangshan outlaws show up, lure Huyan Zhuo into an ambush, and capture him. Huyan Zhuo surrenders and joins the outlaws. After the battle, the outlaws from Mount Peach Blossom, along with their two leaders, become part of the larger outlaw band at Liangshan Marsh.

== Campaigns and death ==
Zhou Tong is appointed as a Tiger Cub Patrol Commander of the Liangshan cavalry after the 108 Heroes are fully assembled. He participates in the campaigns against the Liao invaders and rebel forces in Song territory after the outlaws receive amnesty from Emperor Huizong.

During the final campaign against Fang La's rebel forces, Zhou Tong is assigned to attack Dusong Pass (獨松關; located south of present-day Anji County, Zhejiang), which is guarded by Li Tianrun. While he is scouting the terrain outside the pass, Li Tianrun suddenly charges out, catches him off guard, and kills him. After the campaign is over, the emperor awards Zhou Tong the posthumous title "Righteous Gentleman of Integrity" (義節郎) to honour him for his contributions.
