= Shaanxi Circuit =

- Traditional Chinese: 陝西路
- Simplified Chinese: 陕西路
Transcriptions
Standard Mandarin
- Hanyu Pinyin: Shǎnxī Lù

Shaanxi Circuit or Shaanxi Province was one of the major circuits during the Northern Song dynasty. In 1072 (first year of Yuanfeng, era name in Shenzong regin) it was split into Qinfeng Circuit (秦凤路二路) and Yongxingjun Circuit (永宁军路).

Headquartered in Jingzhao fu (京兆府, modern Xi'an) its administrative area corresponds to roughly the modern provinces of central and southern Shaanxi, southern Ningxia, eastern Gansu, western Henan and southwestern Shanxi.
