= Daxiangguo Temple =

Buddhist temple in Kaifeng, Henan, China

Coordinates: 34°47′34″N 114°20′56″E

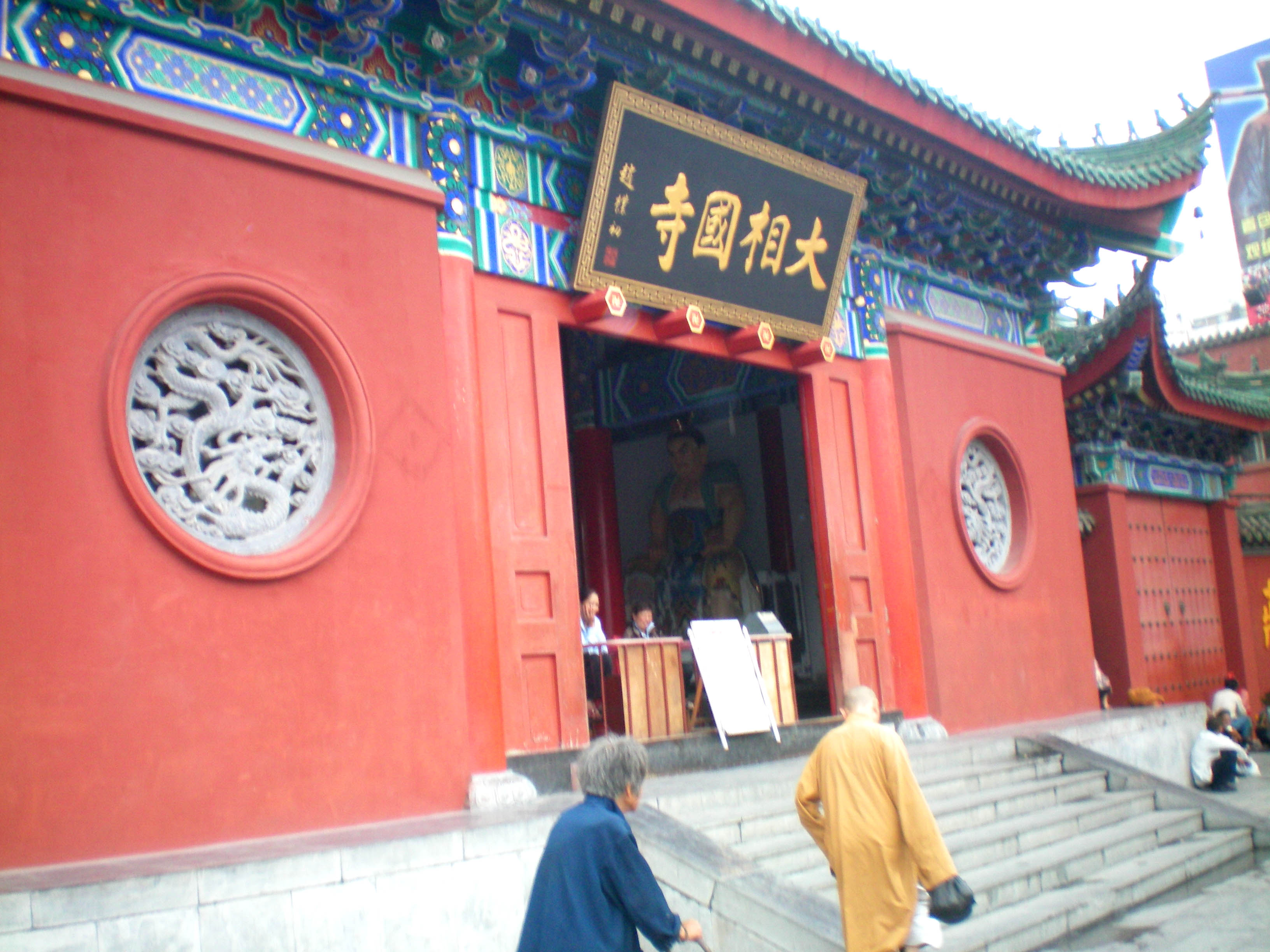

Daxiangguo Temple (simplified Chinese: 大相国寺; traditional Chinese: 大相國寺) is a famous Chinese Buddhist Temple in Kaifeng in eastern Henan province, People's Republic of China. It is located in the center of Kaifeng City. It played a key role in the development of Chinese Buddhism. The views of the temple earned many honors, include "Ten Miracles of a Chinese Temple", "Eight sights of Bianliang", "Xiangguo Frosty Bells," which is also one of the most famous views of this temple. It is also considered among the top ten famous temples in China. A famous computer game called "Moonlight Blade Online" created by Tencent Games recognizes this temple.

== History ==
It was first built in 555 A.D., the sixth year during Emperor Wenxuan's reign of the Northern Qi period (550–577) and it was named "Xiangguo Temple"(simplified Chinese: 相国寺; traditional Chinese: 相國寺. From the historical record, the temple is built on the land belonging to Mr. Xinling, who was one of "Four Gentlemen" during the Warring States period. Then it was renamed Daxiangguo Temple in memory of Emperor Ruizong of Tang, who took the throne as Xiangwang (Chinese: 相王), the king of Xiang, in 712 A.D.

The temple reached the height of its status as a Royal Temple in the Song dynasty. This temple was worshipped and respected by emperors; therefore they reconstructed it in its new area, which is about 540 mu (about 360,000 square meters), managed 64 departments of Chan Buddhism and commandment with several thousand of monks. After the reconstruction, the temple became one of the largest Buddhism temples in China. It's also known as a big hub of poets, musicians and a meeting place for all citizens in that period. Also, the Daxiangguo temple was known as an international Buddhism center; many foreign tourists visited, and many monks went there to study. It was a place for the Chinese to exchange their culture with foreigners. However, it was destroyed in the late Ming dynasty due to the flood of the Yellow River. It was reconstructed under the Qing dynasty. Today, the constructs that remain were basically built during the Qing dynasty.

== Architecture ==
=== Tianwang Dian ===
The Tianwang Dian (Chinese: 天王殿; pinyin: Tiānwángdiàn; lit: "Hall of the Heavenly Kings") includes three red doors and five rooms. The roof was made of golden glazed tiles. The statue of Mi Le Fo is located in the center of the hall. He sits on a lotus, smiling. On both sides of the hall, Four Heavenly Kings stand there as the guard. Mi Le Fo is also known as the successor of Shijiamounifo (Gautama Buddha), who is the founder of Buddhism.

=== Bell tower ===
Almost every Buddhist temple in China has a bell tower, as does the Daxiangguo temple. The bell tower is the first major building that visitors see after they step through the main gate. A bell is hanging in the tower, it weighs about 5 tons, and its height is about 2.23 meters. It had been built in 1748. In winter, the sound echoes of the bell can be heard all over the city.

=== Daxiongbao Hall ===
The Daxiongbao-dian (Traditional Chinese: 大雄寶殿, pinyin: Dàxióng Bǎodiàn) is the main hall of the temple and dates back to the 18th year of the Shunzhi Emperor's reign (1661). It is an individual building which does not connect with other constructs. Ten Chinese stone lions are positioned at the front of the hall. The hall enshrines three Buddhas: Shijiamounifo, Amituofo and Yaoshifo. The Eighteen Arhats are enshrined on the platforms on the east and west walls. Behind the three Buddhas is a large sculpture of the Bodhisattva Guanyin, which is based on the account of the acolyte Sudhana's pilgrimage to find 53 teachers to learn under in the Avataṃsaka Sūtra.

=== Luohan Dian ===
The Luohan Dian (Traditional Chinese: 羅漢殿, pinyin: Luóhàndiàn; lit: "Hall of Arhats") is a hall with eight angles. The constructor used a colored glaze to make the roof. This design makes the hall unique and beautiful; it's very rare in the whole world. In the hall, there are 500 Buddhist arhats standing on both sides of the building. In the center, there is a wooden Guanyin Statue (Avalokitesvara).

== Festival ==
There are many festivals held in the temple every year; the most popular one is the Lantern Festival. During the Lantern Festival, there is a big lantern exhibition in the temple. It is a place to feel traditional Chinese culture.
