= Lu Zhishen =

Water Margin character

- Water Margin character
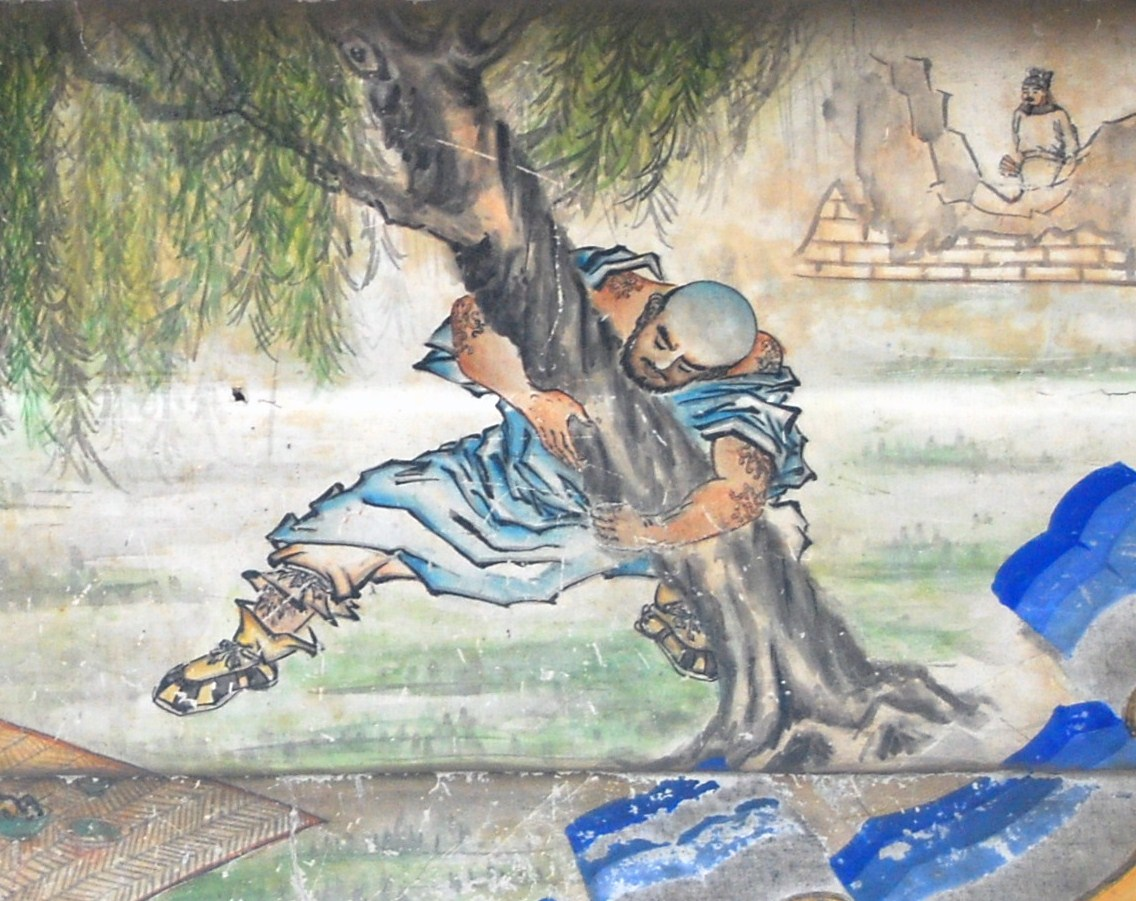
- Lu Zhishen uproots a willow tree
- First appearance: Chapter 3

In-universe information
- Aliases: Lu Da 魯達; Major Lu 魯提轄
- Nicknames: "Flowery Monk" 花和尚
- Weapon: Monk's spade, Dagger
- Origin: Garrison major
- Designation: Infantry leader of Liangshan
- Rank: 13th, Solitary Star (天孤星) of the 36 Heavenly Spirits
- Ancestral home / Place of origin: Weizhou (around present-day Pingliang, Gansu)

Chinese names
- Simplified Chinese: 鲁智深
- Traditional Chinese: 魯智深
- Pinyin: Lǔ Zhìshēn
- Wade–Giles: Lu Chih-shen

Lu Zhishen is a fictional character in Water Margin, one of the four great classical novels in Chinese literature. He is the main character in the first segment of the novel, which spans about six chapters. Nicknamed "Flowery Monk", he ranks 13th among the 36 Heavenly Spirits, the first third of the 108 Stars of Destiny.

One folk tale derived from the novel says he is a sworn brother of the martial artist Zhou Tong, who purportedly trained the Song dynasty general Yue Fei in archery.

== Background ==
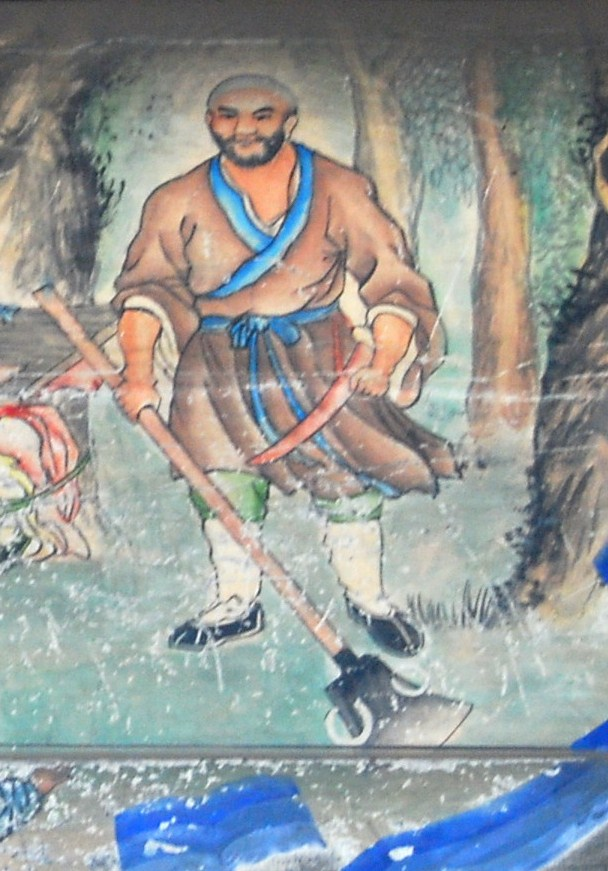
Mural of Lu Zhishen at the Summer Palace, 19th century.

The novel depicts Lu Da (魯達), who later becomes a monk with the name Zhishen, as having a round face, big ears, a straight nose, a squarish mouth and a beard which nearly obscures his face. He originally serves as a garrison major in Weizhou (渭州; around present-day Pingliang, Gansu).

One day Lu meets and makes friends with Shi Jin and Li Zhong when he is off duty. As the three are drinking in an inn, they overhear the singer Jin Cuilian crying over her misfortunes. A wealthy butcher, known as Butcher Zheng, has lured Jin, who is stranded in Weizhou with her elderly father, to be his concubine in exchange for money to bury her mother, who has died of illness. But actually no money was handed over. Soon after she moved into Zheng's house, the butcher's wife, envious of her youth, drove her out. However, Zheng insists that Jin and her father must repay him the money, which has accrued high interests. They are not allowed to leave Weizhou until the "debt" is settled.

After hearing the story, Lu Da gives the father and daughter some money and ensures they leave Weizhou safely. He then goes to Zheng's stall intending to teach him a lesson. He provokes Zheng by ordering him to chop up meat to very fine pieces. Zheng loses patience and attacks him with a cleaver. Lu Da easily knocks him down and with three powerful punches on his face inadvertently kills him. Realizing that the butcher is dead, Lu Da flees Weizhou.

== Becoming a monk ==
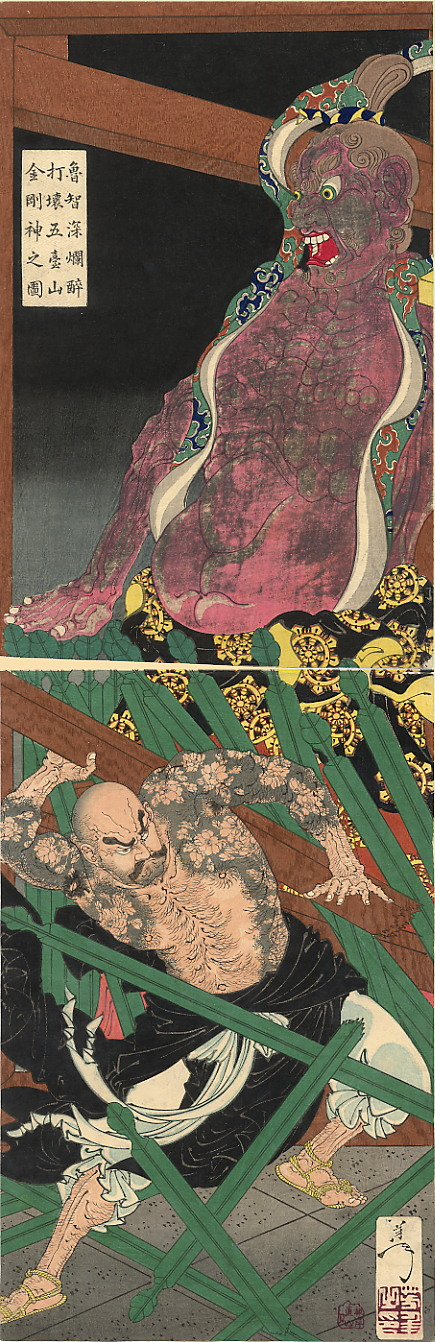
Lu Zhishen in an 1887 woodblock print by Yoshitoshi.

While on the run, Lu Da accidentally meets Jin Cuilian's father, who has settled down at Yanmen county as his daughter is married to a local squire surnamed Zhao. The squire shelters Lu in his manor but the place is not absolutely safe. Zhao suggests Lu conceal his identity by becoming a Buddhist monk at the Manjusri Monastery on nearby Mount Wutai. The abbot at the monastery accepts Lu and gives him the name "Zhishen", which means "sagacious". Lu Da is henceforth known as Lu Zhishen. He also acquires the nickname "Flowery Monk" because his body is tattooed with flowers.

Finding monastic life dreary, one day Lu Zhishen buys and consumes all the wine sold by a wine seller crossing the mountain. When he returns to the monastery drunk, the monks stop him from entering the gate. He breaks in and beats them up. He comes back to his senses when the abbot appears and gives him a dressing down. He is given a second chance.

Soon, feeling bored again, Lu Zhishen sneaks down to the nearby town. There he asks a blacksmith to make him a monk's staff weighing 62 jin and a dagger. He then visits an inn where he eats and drinks without restraint, disregarding Buddhist prohibitions. When the monks on Mount Wutai see Lu Zhishen coming back intoxicated, they immediately shut the gate on him. But Lu smashes the two towering jingang statues flanking the gate, breaks into the monastery, beats up the monks and messes up the meditation hall. This time, the abbot decides to send him to the Great Minister's Temple in the imperial capital Dongjing.

== Encounter with Zhou Tong and Li Zhong ==
On his journey to Dongjing, Lu Zhishen passes by Plum Blossom Village and is offered free lodgings for the night at Squire Liu's manor. He overhears the family crying and finds out that Zhou Tong, a bandit leader from the nearby Mount Plum Blossom, is coming that very night to forcibly marry Squire Liu's daughter. Lu Zhishen lies to the squire that he could dissuade the bandit with his eloquence. Zhou Tong turns up in the finery of a groom and goes to the matrimonial room where he feels his way to the bed in the dark. Lu, who is lying on the bed, jumps onto him and gives him a good thrash. Zhou Tong escapes and asks Li Zhong, the chief of Mount Plum Blossom, to get back at Lu for him. Li Zhong is surprised to find that the monk is Lu Da.

Introduced to the monk by Li Zhong, Zhou Tong is shocked and vows not to disturb the Lius again. Lu Zhishen continues his journey. He meets Shi Jin, who has become a highway robber to obtain money for his journey home. The two team up to defeat and kill a monk and a priest who enslave the monks of a monastery and has been keeping a woman as a sex slave.

== Meeting Lin Chong ==
At the Great Minister's Temple in Dongjing, Lu Zhishen is assigned to tend to a vegetable plot. There he subdues a group of vegetable stealers. The group is so awed by his physical might and fighting skill that they willingly serve him. They adore him even more when he pulls up a deep-rooted willow tree with sheer brute strength.

One day Lin Chong, instructor of the imperial guard, comes across Lu working out with his hefty staff and is amazed by his martial skill. They become sworn brothers. When Lin Chong is exiled to Cangzhou after being framed by Grand Marshal Gao Qiu, whose god son covets the instructor's wife, Lu secretly tails him and his two escorts. He rescues Lin when the two constables, bribed by Gao, are about to murder him in Wild Boar Forest. He is prevented from killing the two men by Lin, who says they are but small fries carrying out an order. Lu accompanies Lin all the way to Cangzhou. Before leaving Lin, he smashes down a tree with a single strike to warn the escorts not to do anything mischievous. He then returns to Dongjing.

== Becoming an outlaw ==
Lu Zhishen has to flee Dongjing when he is found to be the monk who ruined Gao Qiu's plan to kill Lin Chong. He comes by an inn at Cross Slope, where he is drugged and nearly butchered by the inn owner Sun Erniang, who makes buns with human flesh. He is saved in time by Sun's husband Zhang Qing. Zhang suggests he join the outlaw Deng Long on Mount Twin Dragons in Qingzhou. But Deng considers him a threat and barricades the only way up the hill. Lu runs into Yang Zhi, who has also come to join Mount Twin Dragons. Yang takes Lu to Cao Zheng, a butcher who has learnt martial arts from Lin Chong. Cao and Yang pretend that Lu has been drugged and take him up Mount Twin Dragons to be presented to Deng Long. Not suspecting anything, Deng lets them in. Lu hacks Deng to death upon seeing him and is elected the chief of the stronghold.

After his defeat by the bandits of Liangshan Marsh, the imperial general Huyan Zhuo flees to Qingzhou (in present-day Shandong) in the hopes of redeeming himself by wiping out the bandits there. One of the strongholds is Mount Twin Dragons, which, finding Huyan a tough opponent, requests help from Liangshan. Song Jiang, Liangshan's then second-in-command, comes to Qingzhou with a force and captures Huyan. The bandits of Mount Twin Dragons, led by Lu Zhishen, are absorbed into Liangshan.

== Life at Liangshan ==
Lu Zhishen goes to Huayin County to invite Shi Jin and his gang at Mount Shaohua to join Liangshan. At Mount Shaohua, he is told that Shi is caught by Prefect He of Huazhou when he tries to rescue a woman the official has abducted, desiring to make her his concubine. Lu goes to Huazhou alone to rescue Shi, but he is spotted behaving strangely in a crowd by He when he contemplates assassinating the official upon running into his entourage. Prefect He lures him into his office where he is ambushed and seized too. Mount Shaohua turns to Liangshan for help. The Liangshan outlaws rush to Huazhou, lure Prefect He out of the city and kills him. They enter Huazhou and save Lu Zhishen and Shi Jin.

== Death ==
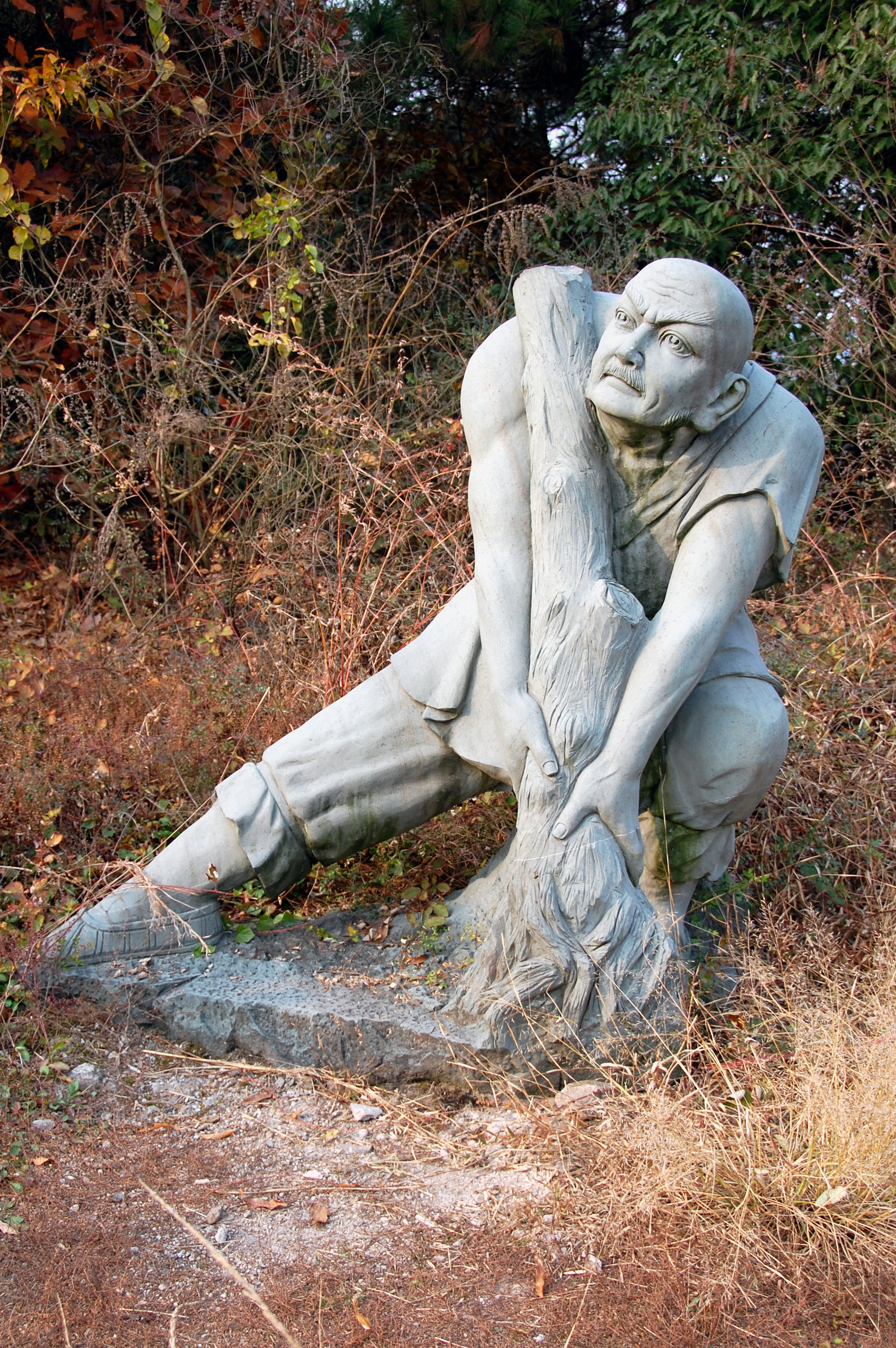
A stone statue of Lu Zhishen at Hengdian World Studios.

Lu Zhishen is appointed as one of Liangshan's infantry leaders after the 108 Stars of Destiny came together in what is called the Grand Assembly. He is one of the few heroes who objected strongly to Song Jiang's quest for amnesty from Emperor Huizong. He nevertheless participates in campaigns against the Liao invaders and rebel forces in Song territory after Liangshan attains amnesty. He scores top merit when he captures the rebel leader Fang La.

When the run of campaigns ends with Fang La's rebellion snuffed out, Lu Zhishen insists on remaining at the Liuhe Pagoda in Hangzhou instead of returning to Dongjing with the lot. On the night before the rest departs for the capital, Lu is awakened from his sleep by the thunderous sound made by the tidal bore in the nearby Qiantang River as it clashes wave after wave onto the bank. At that instant, he grasps the prophetic message concealed in the verse given him by the abbot of the Mount Wutai monastery. The verse goes:

逢夏而擒，
遇臘而執。
聽潮而圓，
見信而寂。

Translation:

Capture Xia when you meet him;
Seize La when you encounter him.
When you hear the tide, complete the circle;
When you see the faithful, enter silence.

The first two lines foretell Lu's capture of Fang La and Fang‘s right–hand man Xiahou Cheng while the following two refer to the Qiantang River's tidal bore, which "faithfully arrives" every year on the 18th day of the 8th Lunar month. The monks of Liuhe Pagoda tell Lu Zhishen that in Buddhist terminology yuanji – made up of the characters yuan (圓; "complete the circle") and ji (寂; "enter silence") – means death. Realising that it is time for him to die, Lu Zhishen bathes and lights some fragrant incense. He then composes an ode and asks Song Jiang to come to see him. But he has already passed on sitting cross-legged on a zafu before Song arrives. Song reads the ode:

平生不修善果，
只愛殺人放火。
忽地頓開金枷，
這裡指斷玉鎖。
咦！錢塘江上潮信來，
今日方知我是我。

Translation:

In my life I never cultivated goodness
Relishing only murder and arson.
Suddenly my golden shackles have been opened;
Here my jade locks have been pulled asunder.
Alas! Hereby the river tide cometh,
Now I finally realise that I am what I am!

Confessing in the ode that he has never read the scriptures as a monk and has instead indulged in killing, Lu Zhishen shows he has attained Buddhist enlightenment with the comprehension that everything has a karmic reason. He is given a funeral befitting that of a high priest.

== Cultural references ==
In the 2022 cyber thriller Rise of the Water Margin, which is a 21st century take on the Water Margin, Lu Zhishen is a retired former commander of Unit 61398 who now works as a cyber detective and a mentor to the current commander Lin Chong. His first big case, investigating the skullduggery of Chairman Zheng of a large meat processing corporation, Willow Holdings, is published as an exposé in a business journal as Uprooting the Willow.

== See also ==
- Lu Zhishen's story for a list of supporting minor characters from Lu Zhishen's story.
