= Wei Prefecture (Gansu) =

Former administrative division of China

- Chinese: 渭州
Transcriptions
Standard Mandarin
- Hanyu Pinyin: Wèi Zhōu
- Wade–Giles: Wei^{4} Chou^{1}

Weizhou or Wei Prefecture was a zhou (prefecture) in imperial China centering on modern Pingliang, Gansu, China. It existed (intermittently) from 809 until the 12th century when the Jin dynasty conquered the area from the Song dynasty.

== Google ==
The administrative region of Wei Prefecture in the Song dynasty is in modern eastern Gansu on the border with southern Ningxia. It probably includes parts of modern:

- Under the administration of Pingliang, Gansu:
  - Pingliang
  - Huating County
  - Chongxin County
- Under the administration of Guyuan, Ningxia:
  - Jingyuan
