= Hua Prefecture (Shaanxi) =

Prefecture in imperial China

Hua Prefecture (華州): Tai Prefecture (太州); Huayin Commandery (華陰郡); Dexing Prefecture (德興府)
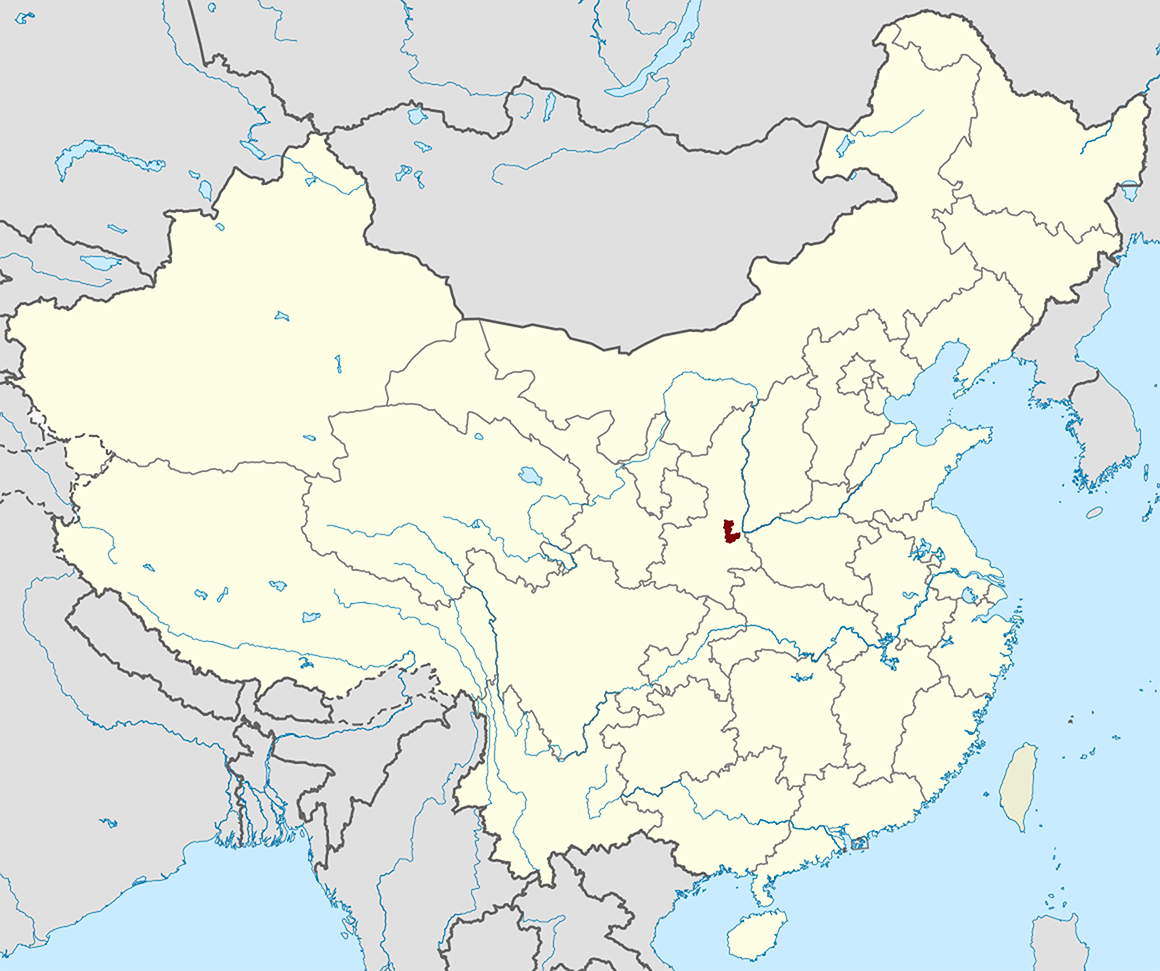
- Population
  - 740s or 750s: 223,613
  - 1100s: 269,380
- History
  - Preceded by: Dongyong Prefecture (東雍州)
  - Created: 554 (Western Wei)
  - Abolished: 1913 (Republic of China)
  - Succeeded by: Hua County, Shaanxi
- Contained within
  - Circuit: Tang dynasty: Guannei Circuit; Song dynasty: Shaanxi Circuit; Yongxingjun Circuit

Hua Prefecture
- Traditional Chinese: 華州
- Simplified Chinese: 华州
Transcriptions
Standard Mandarin
- Hanyu Pinyin: Huá Zhōu

Huazhou or Hua Prefecture was a zhou (prefecture) in imperial China seated in modern Hua County, Shaanxi, China. It existed (intermittently) from 554 to 1913. Through history it was also known by other names, including Tai Prefecture (685–705, 760–762), Huayin Commandery (742–758) and Dexing Prefecture (897–900).

== Counties ==
1. Zheng (鄭), modern Hua County
2. Pucheng (蒲城), modern Pucheng County
3. Huayin (華陰), modern Huayin
4. Weinan (渭南), modern Weinan
