= Huayin =

Coordinates: 34°35′N 110°06′E

Huayin 华阴市 Hwayin
- County-level city
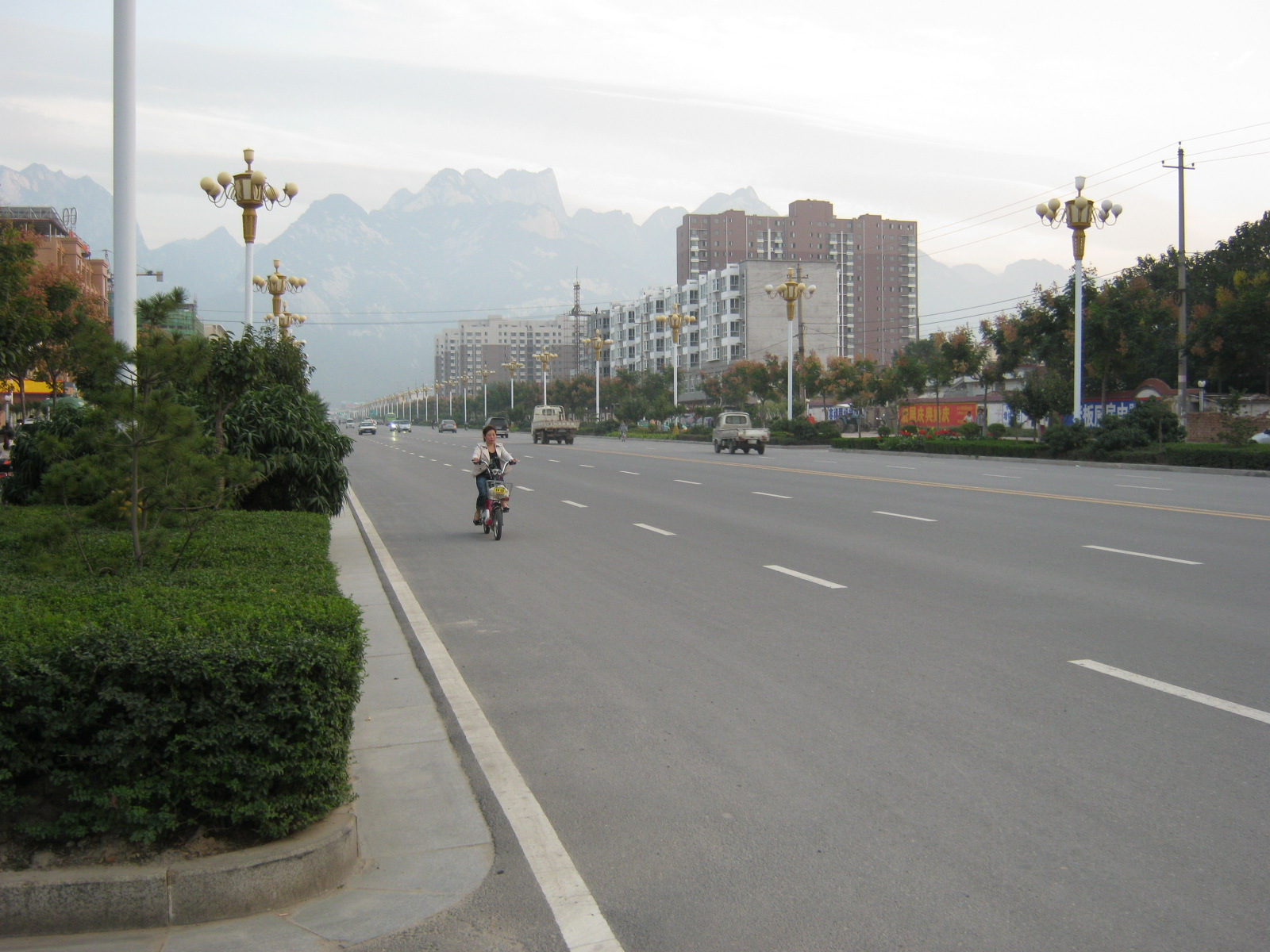
- Interactive map of Huayin
- Country: People's Republic of China
- Province: Shaanxi
- Prefecture-level city: Weinan

Area
  - Total: 817 km^{2} (315 sq mi)

Population (2017)
  - Total: 263,352
  - Density: 322/km^{2} (835/sq mi)
- Time zone: UTC+8 (China standard time)
- Postal code: 342300
- Area code: 714200

Huayin
- Simplified Chinese: 华阴市
- Traditional Chinese: 華陰市
- Hanyu Pinyin: Huàyīn Shì
Transcriptions
Standard Mandarin
- Hanyu Pinyin: Huàyīn Shì
Yue: Cantonese
- Jyutping: waa^{4}jam^{1} si^{5}

Huayin is a county-level city in Weinan, Shaanxi province, China. Prior to 1990, Huayin was regarded as a county. Huayin literally means 'to the north of Mount Hua', because it is to the north of that mountain.

== Administrative divisions ==
As of 2019, Huayin City is divided to 2 subdistricts, 4 towns and 1 other.

Subdistricts

- Taihualu Subdistrict (太华路街道)
- Yuemiao Subdistrict (岳庙街道)

Towns

- Mengyuan (孟塬镇)
- Huaxi (华西镇)
- Luofu (罗敷镇)
- Huashan (华山镇)

Others

- State-owned Shaanxi Huashan Enterprise Companyown (国营陕西华山企业公司)

== Climate ==
Climate data for Huayin, elevation 342 m (1,122 ft), (1991–2020 normals, extremes 1981–2010)
Month	Jan	Feb	Mar	Apr	May	Jun	Jul	Aug	Sep	Oct	Nov	Dec	Year
Record high °C (°F)	15.9 (60.6)	23.0 (73.4)	30.5 (86.9)	36.2 (97.2)	39.4 (102.9)	42.1 (107.8)	40.2 (104.4)	41.1 (106.0)	39.9 (103.8)	33.6 (92.5)	24.5 (76.1)	20.9 (69.6)	42.1 (107.8)
Mean daily maximum °C (°F)	5.1 (41.2)	9.9 (49.8)	16.3 (61.3)	22.7 (72.9)	27.8 (82.0)	32.5 (90.5)	33.0 (91.4)	31.1 (88.0)	26.4 (79.5)	20.2 (68.4)	12.8 (55.0)	6.5 (43.7)	20.4 (68.6)
Daily mean °C (°F)	−0.5 (31.1)	3.6 (38.5)	9.6 (49.3)	15.7 (60.3)	20.8 (69.4)	25.8 (78.4)	27.3 (81.1)	25.4 (77.7)	20.3 (68.5)	14.1 (57.4)	6.8 (44.2)	0.8 (33.4)	14.1 (57.4)
Mean daily minimum °C (°F)	−4.6 (23.7)	−1.1 (30.0)	4.0 (39.2)	9.3 (48.7)	14.2 (57.6)	19.5 (67.1)	22.2 (72.0)	20.8 (69.4)	15.7 (60.3)	9.7 (49.5)	2.4 (36.3)	−3.4 (25.9)	9.1 (48.3)
Record low °C (°F)	−14.7 (5.5)	−13.7 (7.3)	−9.3 (15.3)	−2.0 (28.4)	0.7 (33.3)	10.0 (50.0)	14.2 (57.6)	11.7 (53.1)	5.2 (41.4)	−4.5 (23.9)	−13.2 (8.2)	−18.6 (−1.5)	−18.6 (−1.5)
Average precipitation mm (inches)	5.7 (0.22)	9.0 (0.35)	15.8 (0.62)	36.9 (1.45)	56.1 (2.21)	63.5 (2.50)	105.8 (4.17)	91.3 (3.59)	88.6 (3.49)	55.2 (2.17)	22.4 (0.88)	3.8 (0.15)	554.1 (21.8)
Average precipitation days (≥ 0.1 mm)	3.9	3.5	5.0	7.0	8.6	8.0	10.3	9.7	10.4	8.6	6.0	2.7	83.7
Average snowy days	4.1	2.6	1.1	0.1	0	0	0	0	0	0	1.1	2.4	11.4
Average relative humidity (%)	66	64	61	64	64	61	73	78	80	79	76	69	70
Mean monthly sunshine hours	119.6	128.5	171.2	201.5	210.9	209.5	218.1	203.0	149.8	128.2	117.8	124.2	1,982.3
Percentage possible sunshine	38	41	46	51	49	48	50	49	41	37	38	41	44
Source: China Meteorological Administration
