= Zheng Tianshou =

Water Margin character

Zhèng Tiānshòu
- Water Margin character
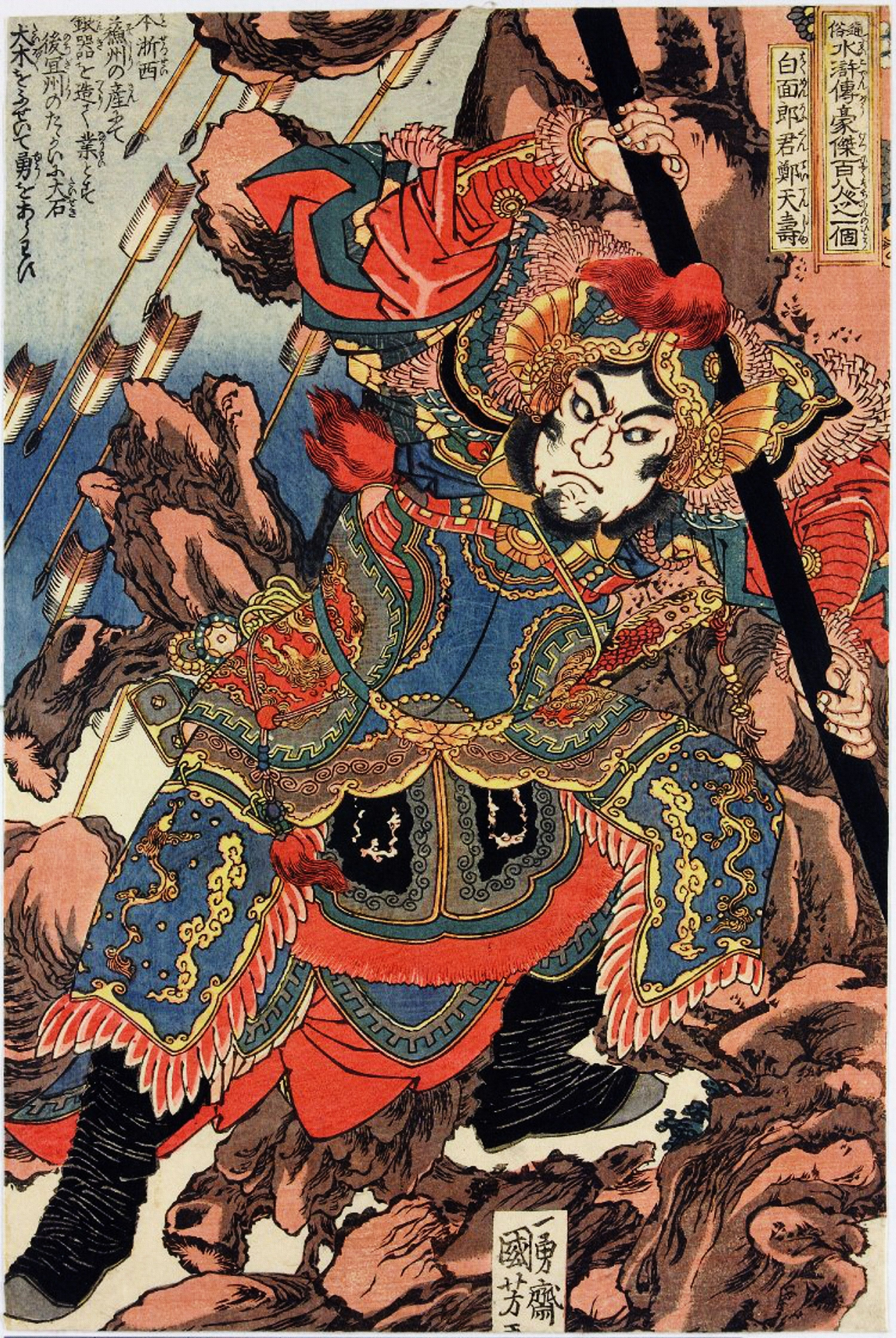
- Art by Utagawa Kuniyoshi 1797-1861; "Fair-skinned Gentleman" Zheng Tianshou (Hakumenrokun Tei Tenja), from “108 Heroes of Water Margin (Tsuzoku Suikoden goketsu hyakuhachinin no hitori)
- First appearance: Chapter 32

In-universe information
- Alias: Tei Tenja
- Nickname: "Fair-skinned Gentleman" 白面郎君
- Origin: Bandit leader from Mount Qingfeng
- Designation: Infantry leader of Liangshan
- Rank: 74th, Different Star (地異星) of the 72 Earthly Fiends
- Ancestral home / Place of origin: Suzhou, Jiangsu

Chinese names
- Simplified Chinese: 郑天寿
- Traditional Chinese: 鄭天壽
- Pinyin: Zhèng Tiānshòu
- Wade–Giles: Cheng T'ien-shou

Zheng Tianshou is a fictional character in Water Margin, one of the Four Great Classical Novels in Chinese literature. Nicknamed "Fair-skinned Gentleman", he ranks 74th among the 108 Stars of Destiny and 38th among the 72 Earthly Fiends.

== Background ==
Nicknamed "Fair-skinned Gentleman", Zheng Tianshou is depicted as good-looking with a fair complexion, a lean build and broad shoulders. He is skilled in martial arts. Originally from Suzhou, he spends most of his younger days wandering around the Song Empire.

One day, when he passes by Mount Qingfeng (清風山; in present-day Qingzhou, Shandong), a group of bandits led by Wang Ying set upon him to rob him. Zheng fights Wang to a standstill. Impressed with his fighting skill, Yan Shun, the chief of the bandits, invites him to join his band. Zheng gladly agrees and takes the third position after Yan and Wang.

== Meeting Song Jiang ==
When Song Jiang, on the run to escape arrest after killing his mistress Yan Poxi, is heading to Qingfeng Fort (清風寨; near Mount Qingfeng) to take shelter under his friend Hua Rong, he passes by Mount Qingfeng and is captured in a trap by the bandits. They want to kill him and use his heart to make soup. Just as Song is about to be sliced up, he sighs loudly, "Am I, Song Jiang, destined to die just like this?" Yan Shun is surprised to hear the name of a man he admires for chivalry. and stops the killing in time. After Song confirmed his identity, the three bandit chiefs release him, apologise to him, and treat him as an honoured guest.

While at the stronghold, Song Jiang saves a woman from being raped by Wang Ying, who has abducted her as she was crossing the hill with her servants. Learning that the woman is the wife of Liu Gao, the governor of Qingfeng Fort and thus the superior of Hua Rong, who is the fort's military commandant, he persuades Wang to let her go. Wang reluctantly agrees.

== Joining Liangshan ==
One festive night, Song Jiang, then staying at Hua Rong's house, goes outdoor to watch the celebrations. The wife of Liu Gao spots him and lies to her husband that Song had abducted her at Mount Qingfeng and nearly raped her. Liu Gao believes his wife and arrests Song.

Hua Rong, who rescued Song Jiang but could not prevent him being seized again by Liu Gao, is by and by also arrested himself. Both are being escorted to the prefecture office of Qingzhou, which oversees Qingfeng Fort. Yan Shun, Wang Ying and Zheng Tianshou intercepts the convoy, together defeating the escort leader Huang Xin and rescues them. Later, the bandits, under the leadership of Song and Hua, participates in a battle fighting with Qin Ming, a commander sent from Qingzhou to eliminate them. Initially cold to Song's invitation to join the band, Qin is eventually won over following a plot by Song.

Afraid that Qingzhou would send a larger force, Song Jiang suggests the group decamp to join the bandits of Liangshan Marsh. Thus Zheng Tianshou is absorbed into Liangshan.

== Campaigns and death ==
Zheng Tianshou is appointed as one of the leaders of the Liangshan infantry after the 108 Stars of Destiny came together in what is called the "Grand Assembly". He participates in the campaigns against the Liao invaders and rebel forces in Song territory following amnesty from Emperor Huizong for Liangshan.

Zheng Tianshou is killed in the battle of Muzhou (睦州; in present-day Hangzhou, Zhejiang) in the campaign against Fang La when he is hit by an enemy projectile.
