= Romance of the Three Kingdoms =

14th-century Chinese historical novel

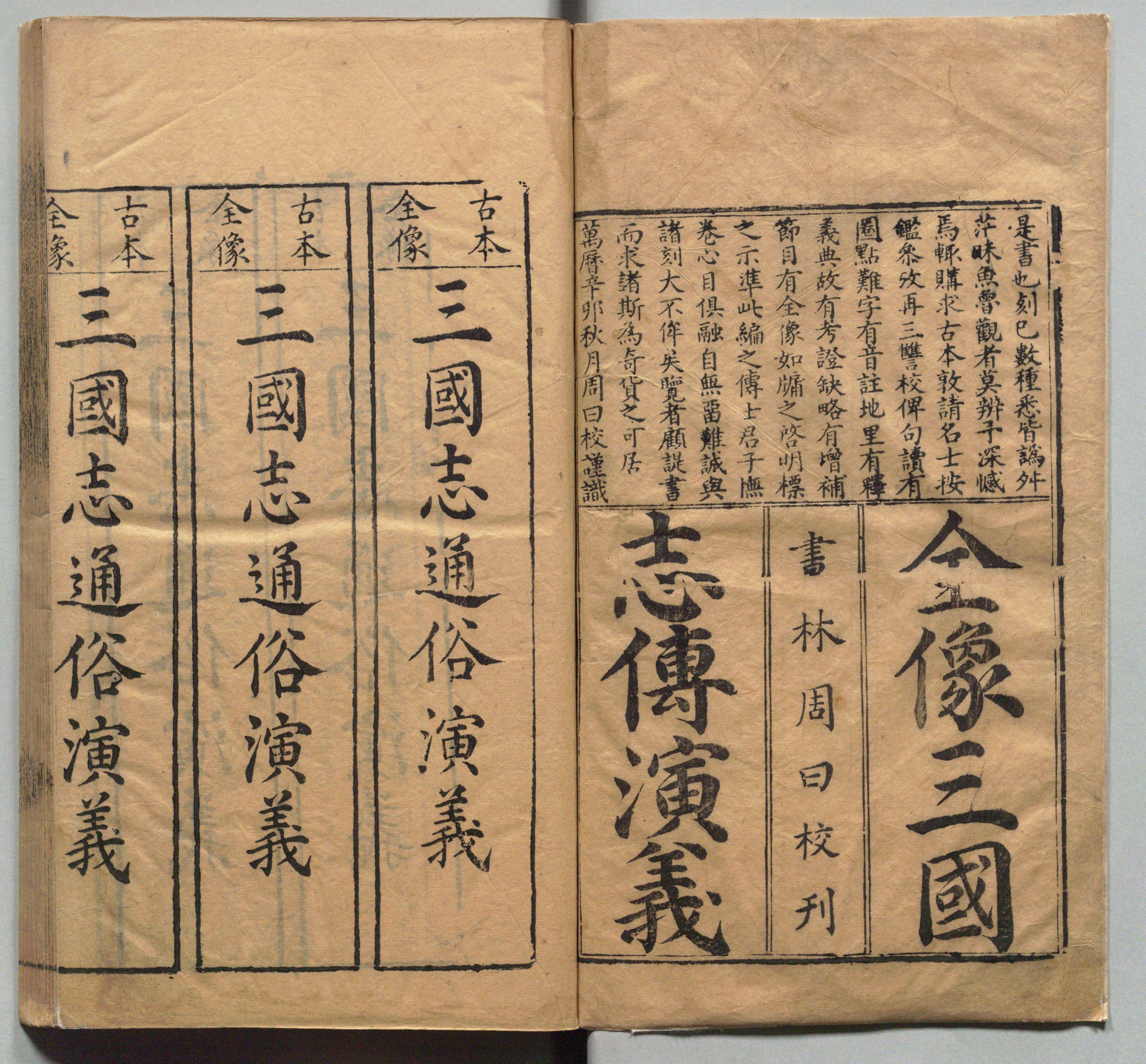
- Title pages from a 1591 printed edition of the novel
- Author: Luo Guanzhong
- Original title: 三國演義
- Language: Chinese
- Subject: Imperial China
- Genre: Historical fiction
- Set in: China, AD 169–280
- Publication date: 14th century (manuscripts); 1494 (preface); 1522 (first complete printed edition)
- Publication place: China
- English publication date: 1907
- Media type: Print
- Dewey Decimal: 895.1346
- Original text: 三國演義 at Chinese Wikisource
- Translation: Romance of the Three Kingdoms at Wikisource

Romance of the Three Kingdoms

Chinese name
- Traditional Chinese: 三國演義
- Simplified Chinese: 三国演义
Transcriptions
Standard Mandarin
- Hanyu Pinyin: Sānguó yǎnyì
- Wade–Giles: San^{1}-kuo^{2} yen^{3}-i^{4}
- IPA: [sán.kwǒ jɛ̀n.î]
Wu
- Suzhounese: Se-kueh iè-nyî
Yue: Cantonese
- Yale Romanization: Sāamgwok yínyih
- Jyutping: Saam1-gwok3 jin2-ji6
- IPA: [sam˥.kʷɔk̚˧ jin˧˥.ji˨]
Southern Min
- Hokkien POJ: Sam-kok ián-gī

Romance of the Three Kingdoms (traditional Chinese: 三國演義; simplified Chinese: 三国演义; pinyin: Sānguó Yǎnyì) is a 14th-century Chinese historical novel attributed to Luo Guanzhong. Its narrative covers events from the decline of the Han dynasty and the Yellow Turban Rebellion to the reunification of China under the Western Jin in 280.

The novel draws on Chen Shou's Records of the Three Kingdoms, Pei Songzhi's annotations, earlier chronicles, and popular storytelling traditions including the Sanguozhi Pinghua. It combines historical figures and events with fictional scenes, speeches, and supernatural episodes. The narrative gives particular moral and political weight to Liu Bei and Shu Han while following the rivalry among Shu, Cao Wei, and Eastern Wu.

Romance of the Three Kingdoms is acclaimed as one of the Four Great Classic Novels of Chinese literature; it has a total of 800,000 words and nearly a thousand dramatic characters (mostly historical) in 120 chapters. The novel is among the most beloved works of literature in East Asia, and its literary influence in the region has been compared to that of the works of Shakespeare on English literature. Its impact is also extensive and eminent in Southeast Asia, with many of its characters becoming household names there. It has influenced literature, drama, games, and popular accounts of the Three Kingdoms throughout the regions. It is arguably the most widely read historical novel in late imperial and modern China. Herbert Giles stated that for the Chinese themselves, this is regarded as the "greatest among their countless novels".

== Origins and versions ==
Pages from a printed edition of the novel, volume five

The beginning chapter lists from Li Zhuowu's commentary edition (late Ming dynasty) of the novel, volume one

Stories about the heroes of the Three Kingdoms were the basis of entertainment dating back to the Sui and Tang dynasty (6th–10th centuries). By the Song dynasty (10th–13th centuries), records mention professional oral storytellers who specialized in tales of the Three Kingdoms heroes. The earliest written work to combine these stories was a pinghua named Sanguozhi Pinghua published sometime between 1321 and 1323.

=== Expansion of the history ===
Romance of the Three Kingdoms is traditionally attributed to Luo Guanzhong, a playwright who lived sometime between 1315 and 1400 (late Yuan to early Ming period) known for compiling historical plays in styles which were prevalent during the Yuan period. It was first printed in 1522 as Sanguozhi Tongsu Yanyi (三國志通俗演義, Popular Romance of the Records of the Three Kingdoms) in an edition which bore a preface dated 1494. The text may well have circulated before either date in handwritten manuscripts.

Regardless of when it was written or whether Luo was the writer, the author made use of several available historical records, primarily the Records of the Three Kingdoms compiled by Chen Shou in the 3rd century. The Records of the Three Kingdoms covered events ranging from the Yellow Turban Rebellion in 184 to the unification of the Three Kingdoms under the Jin dynasty in 280. The novel also includes material from Tang dynasty poetic works, Yuan dynasty operas and his own personal interpretation of elements such as virtue and legitimacy. The author combined this historical knowledge with his own storytelling skills to create a rich tapestry of personalities.

=== Recensions and standardised text ===
Luo Guanzhong's version in 24 volumes, known as the Sanguozhi Tongsu Yanyi, is now held in the Shanghai Library in China, Tenri Central Library in Japan, and several other major libraries. Various 10-volume, 12-volume and 20-volume recensions of Luo's text, made between 1522 and 1690, are also held at libraries around the world. However, the standard text familiar to general readers is a recension by Mao Lun and his son Mao Zonggang.

At the end of the Ming dynasty, a "Li Zhuowu" added commentary to the Luo version, which expanded its circulation and influence. While Li Zhuowu was the art name of Li Zhi, the commentary was likely written by an imposter named Ye Zhou (葉晝).Nevertheless, it is consistent with the anti-authoritarian views of the historical Li Zhi. The persona of Li Zhuowu "is presented as a reader who appreciates the text, an interpreter and appropriate model for readers unfamiliar with the form".

In addition to quandian (圈點; placement of small circles and dots to the right of the text to indicate emphasis), Li Zhuowu included interlineal comments and comments at the end of chapters. The interlineal comments, written with smaller characters alongside the novel text, were typically short exclamations. For example, when Liu Bei is described in the novel text as not fond of reading, Li exclaims: "Taking no joy in reading is the mark of a hero". The comments at the end of chapters were longer and were often ironic and conversational. For example, there is a comment in one of the later chapters about the relevance of the novel as follows: "Since [similar events] were narrated previously, this does nothing more than change the names to pad out the narrative. How irritating! This is why it is an 'elaboration' [yanyi] of the Chronicles of the Three Kingdoms [Sanguo zhi]. Laughable!". However, another comment emphasizes the need for elaboration: "Even so, this is a 'popular romance' and not official history. If it were not so [embellished], then how could it be 'popular'? ".

This version of the novel contained numerous illustrations of scenes depicted in the text. Illustrations were a near ubiquitous feature of late Ming dynasty books. The flourishing of book illustrations at the time apparently resulted from increased prosperity of the elite which allowed them greater opportunity to read for fun.

In 1591, Zhou Yue, owner of the Wanjuanlou Bookshop, published his edited version of the novel with the title, A Newly Proofed Edition of the Romance of the Three Kingdoms. It contained 250 chapters in 12 volumes and included 240 2-page illustrations. Each illustration is flanked by couplets, each line with 11 characters. These were composed by literati and described the scene in a poetic manner. For example, the illustration "Guan Yu traveled one thousand li alone." depicts Guan Yu as he begins a journey to rejoin his sworn brother, Liu Bei. It includes the couplet (loose translation), "Loyal and righteous, he returned to his former master alone with a single sword; the hero, moved by his loyalty, was willing to travel to his beloved master a thousand li away."

Zheng Zhenduo commented that the prints are bold and vigorous, and while somewhat crude, they are ultimately far superior to the 'delicate' prints in other works. A modern reviewer noted that "the lines of the illustrations are energetic, the characters clearly outlined, with vivid and dynamic depictions of action, especially for those climatic chapters". However, the illustrations appear to function more for decoration than to advance the plot.

At the time it was published, the Zhou Yue illustrated edition was the most popular version of the novel. However, the standard text currently familiar to general readers is a recension by Mao Lun and his son Mao Zonggang. Historical editions of the Mao version vary with respect to the illustrations included and these are typically omitted from modern translations. The 1802 edition at the Harvard-Yenching Library, available online, has 12 portrait-style illustrations at the commencement of Volume 1. The 1888 edition, Mao Shenshang's Critique of the Romance of the Three Kingdoms/ Most Brilliant Writing of Talent and Taste/ Saoye shanfang edition, National Palace Museum collection, has 40 such illustrations. These depict the main characters together with text highlighting their role in the narrative. These editions were variations of the work first published in the 17th century.

In the 1660s, during the reign of the Kangxi Emperor in the Qing dynasty, Mao Lun and Mao Zonggang significantly edited the text, fitting it into 120 chapters and abbreviating the title to Sanguozhi Yanyi. The text was reduced from 900,000 to 750,000 characters; significant editing was done for narrative flow; use of third-party poems was reduced and shifted from conventional verse to finer pieces; and most passages praising Cao Cao's advisers and generals were removed. Scholars have long debated whether the Maos' viewpoint was anti-Qing (identifying Southern Ming remnants with Shu-Han) or pro-Qing.

Commentary is estimated to be almost two-thirds as large as the bulk of the text. The Mao introductory essay titled "How to Read The Romance of the Three Kingdoms" begins:

Readers of the Chronicle of the Three Kingdoms should be aware of the distinction between states that rule by legitimate succession, those that rule during an intercalary period, and those that rule illegitimately. ... Why should the state of Wei [established by Cao Cao] not be accorded legitimacy? According to territorial criteria, control of the Central Plain might be sufficient to establish legitimacy; but according to the criterion of principle, legitimacy should be accorded to the Liu clan [the ruling house of the Han dynasty, 202 B.C.-220 A.D.]. The criterion of principle ought to take precedence over territorial consideration.

The famous opening lines of the novel, "The empire, long divided, must unite; long united, must divide. Thus it has ever been" (話說天下大勢．分久必合，合久必分), long understood to be Luo's introduction and cyclical philosophy, were actually added by the Maos in their substantially revised edition of 1679. None of the earlier editions contained this phrase. In addition, Mao also added Yang Shen's The Immortals by the River as the famous introductory poem (which began with "The gushing waters of the Yangzi River pour and disappear into the East", 滾滾長江東逝水) to the novel. The earlier editions, moreover, spend less time on the process of division, which they found painful, and far more time on the process of reunification and the struggles of the heroes who sacrificed for it.

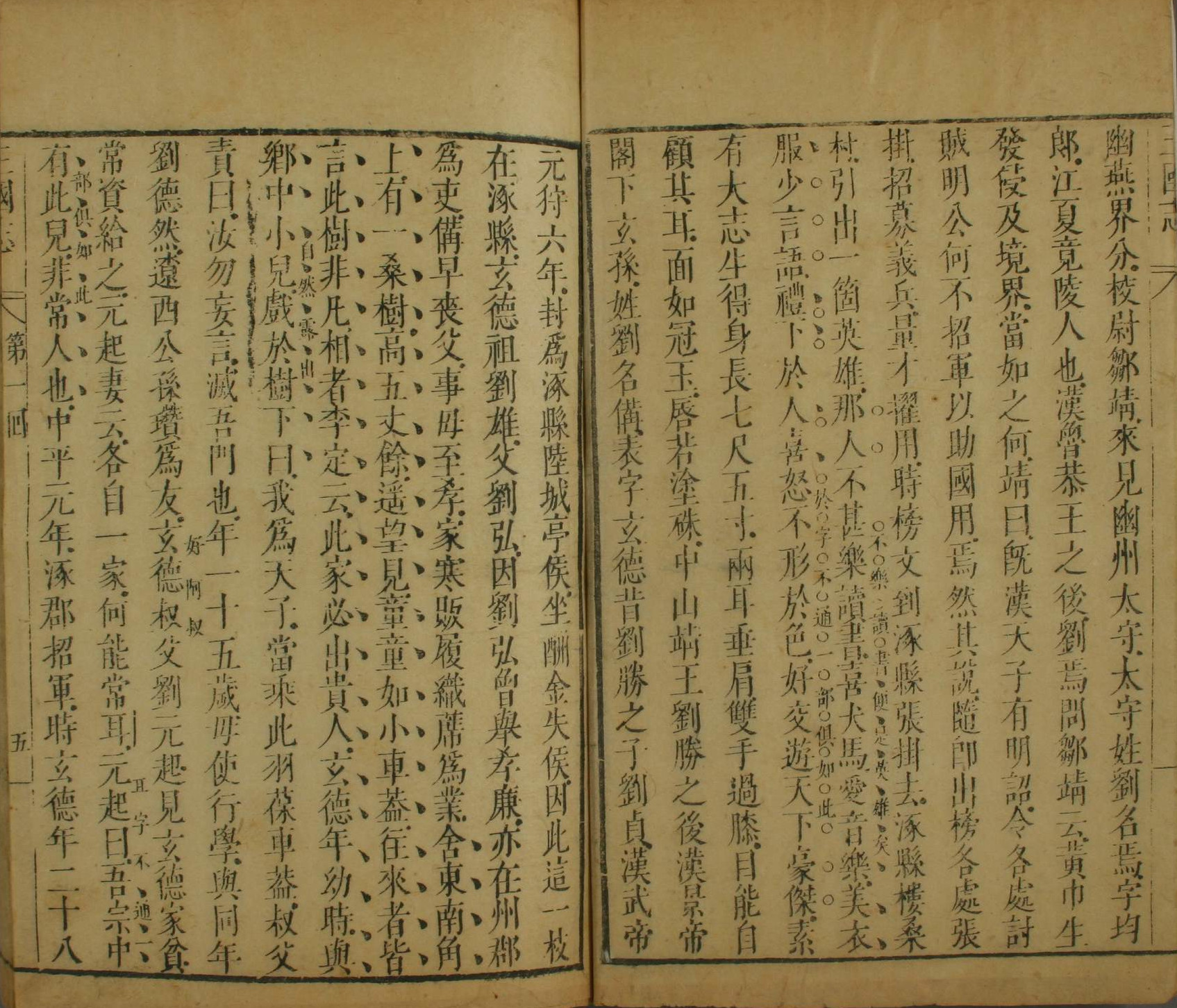
Pages from chapter one of Li Zhuowu's (late Ming dynasty) commentary edition of the novel, which includes Li's comments describing Liu Bei, e.g. "He is a hero in the world"

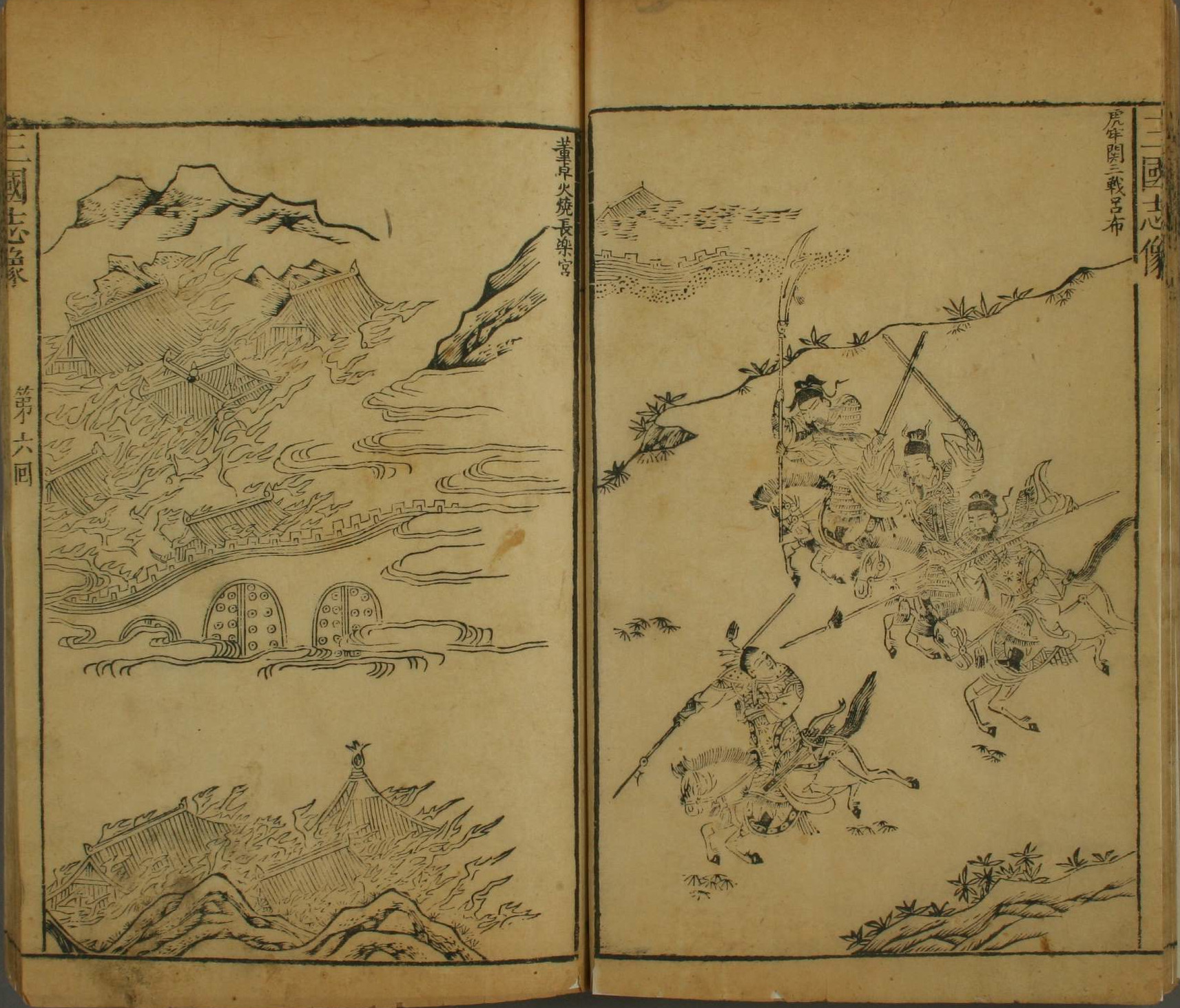
Illustrations from Li Zhuowu's commentary edition: "Dong Zhuo burns the Changle Palace [in Luoyang]" (left) and "Three heroes [Liu Bei, Guan Yu, and Zhang Fei] fight Lü Bu" (right)

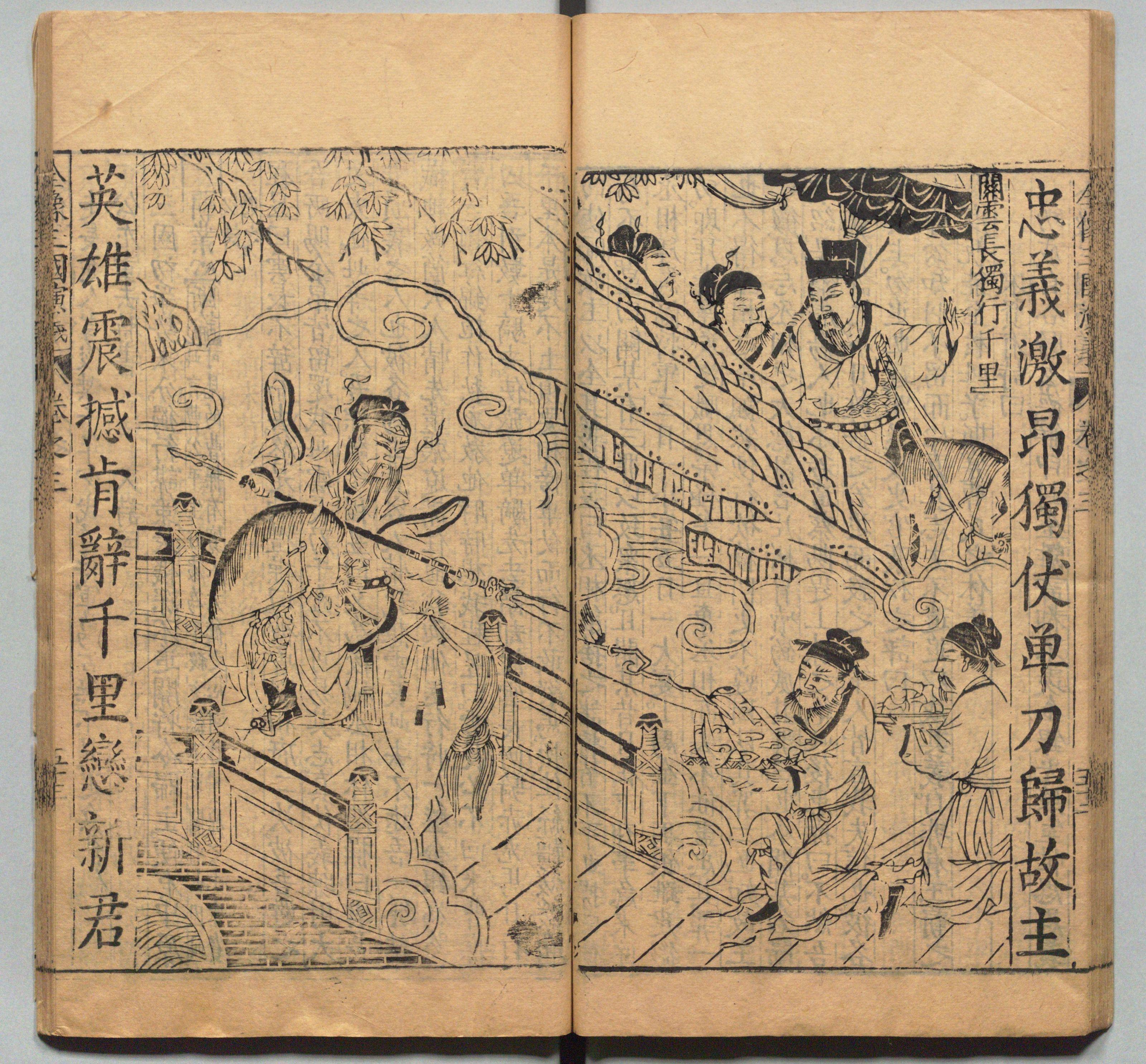
A 2-page illustration from Zhou Yue's 1591 edition: "Guan Yu Traveled One Thousand Li Alone". Guan Yu is depicted on his horse Red Hare

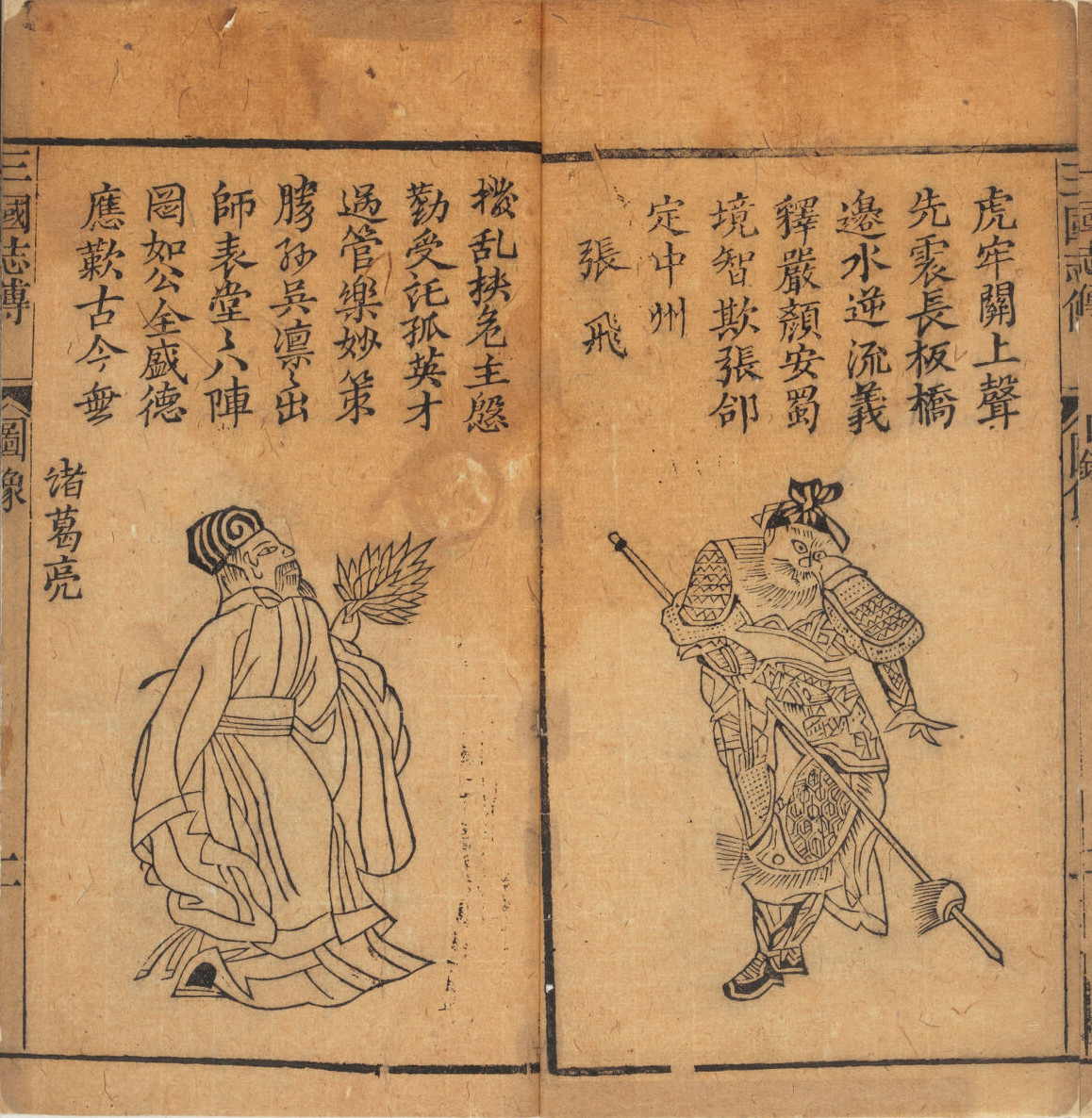
Illustrations from Romance of the Three Kingdoms, an 1802 edition of the Mao version: Facing pages: Zhuge Liang (left) and Zhang Fei (right)

== Plot ==
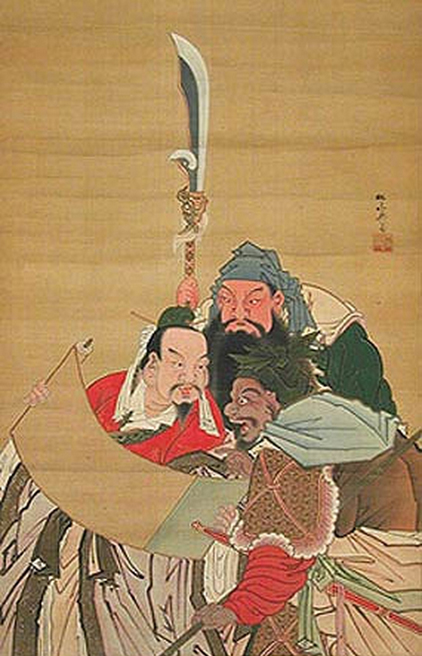
Three Heroes of Three Kingdoms, silk painting by Sekkan Sakurai (1715–1790), depicting Liu Bei, Guan Yu and Zhang Fei.

The following is a summary of the central plot and some well-known highlights in the novel.

=== Yellow Turban Rebellion and the Ten Attendants ===
In the late second century, towards the end of the Han dynasty in China, corruption was rampant on all levels throughout the government, with treacherous eunuchs and villainous officials deceiving the emperor and persecuting those who stood up to them. The Han Empire gradually deteriorated and became increasingly fragmented, with many regional officials being warlords with their own armies. In the meantime, the common people suffered, and the Yellow Turban Rebellion (led by Zhang Jiao and his brothers) eventually broke out during the reign of Emperor Ling.

The rebellion was barely suppressed by imperial forces commanded by the general He Jin. Shortly after Emperor Ling's death, He Jin installed the young Emperor Shao on the throne and took control of the central government. The Ten Attendants, a group of influential court eunuchs, feared that He Jin was growing too powerful, so they lured him into the palace and assassinated him. In revenge, He Jin's followers broke into the palace and indiscriminately slaughtered any person who looked like a eunuch. In the ensuing chaos, Emperor Shao and his younger half-brother, the Prince of Chenliu, disappeared from the palace.

=== Dong Zhuo's tyranny ===
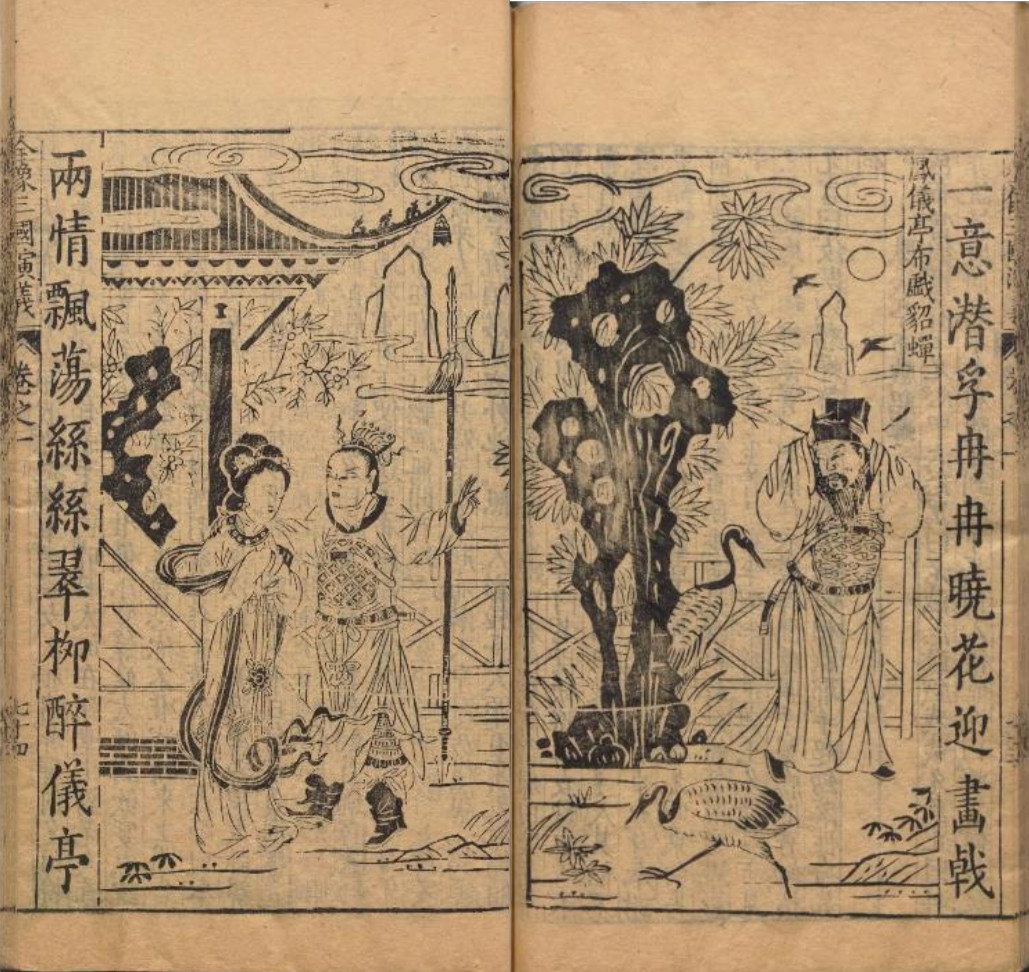
Illustration from a 1591 edition of the novel: "Fengyi Pavilion, Lü Bu, Diaochan". Diaochan flirts with Lü Bu as Dong Zhuo watches from behind a tree

The missing emperor and prince were found by soldiers of the warlord Dong Zhuo, who escorted them back to the palace and used the opportunity to seize control of the imperial capital, Luoyang, under the pretext of protecting the emperor. Dong Zhuo later deposed Emperor Shao and replaced him with the Prince of Chenliu (Emperor Xian), who was merely a figurehead under his control. Dong Zhuo monopolised state power, persecuted his political opponents, and oppressed the common people for his personal gain. During this time, there were two attempts on his life: the first was by a military officer Wu Fu (伍孚), who failed and died a gruesome death; the second was by Cao Cao, who was also unsuccessful but managed to escape.

Cao Cao fled from Luoyang, returned to his home commandery, and sent out a fake imperial edict to various warlords, calling them to rise up against Dong Zhuo. Under Yuan Shao's leadership, eighteen warlords formed a coalition and launched a punitive campaign against Dong Zhuo. After Dong Zhuo lost the battles of Sishui Pass and Hulao Pass, he forced the citizens of Luoyang to relocate to Chang'an with him and burnt down Luoyang. The coalition ultimately broke up due to indecisive leadership and conflicting interests among its members. Meanwhile, in Chang'an, Dong Zhuo was betrayed and murdered by his foster son Lü Bu in a dispute over the maiden Diaochan as part of a plot orchestrated by the minister Wang Yun.

=== Conflict among the various warlords and nobles ===
In the meantime, the Han Empire was already disintegrating into civil war as warlords fought for territories and power. Sun Jian found the Imperial Seal in the ruins of Luoyang and secretly kept it for himself. When Yuan Shao confronted him, he refused to hand over the Imperial Seal and left, but was attacked by Liu Biao (acting on Yuan Shao's instruction) on the way back to his base. At the same time, Yuan Shao waged war against Gongsun Zan to consolidate his power in northern China. Other warlords such as Cao Cao and Liu Bei, who initially had no titles or land, were also gradually forming their own armies and taking control of territories. During those times of upheaval, Cao Cao saved Emperor Xian from Dong Zhuo's followers, established the new imperial capital in Xu, and became the new head of the central government. He also defeated rival warlords such as Lü Bu, Yuan Shu and Zhang Xiu in a series of wars and gained control over much of central China.

Meanwhile, Sun Jian was killed in an ambush by Liu Biao's forces. His eldest son, Sun Ce, delivered the Imperial Seal as a tribute to the warlord Yuan Shu, a rising pretender to the throne, in exchange for troops and horses. Sun Ce then secured himself a power base in the rich riverlands of Jiangdong (Wu), on which the state of Eastern Wu was founded later. Tragically, Sun Ce also died at the pinnacle of his career from illness under stress of his terrifying encounter with the ghost of Yu Ji, a venerable magician whom he had falsely accused of heresy and executed in jealousy. Sun Quan, his younger brother and successor, proved to be a capable and charismatic ruler. With assistance from Zhou Yu, Zhang Zhao and others, Sun Quan found hidden talents such as Lu Su to serve him, built up his military forces, and maintained stability in Jiangdong.

=== Liu Bei's ambition ===
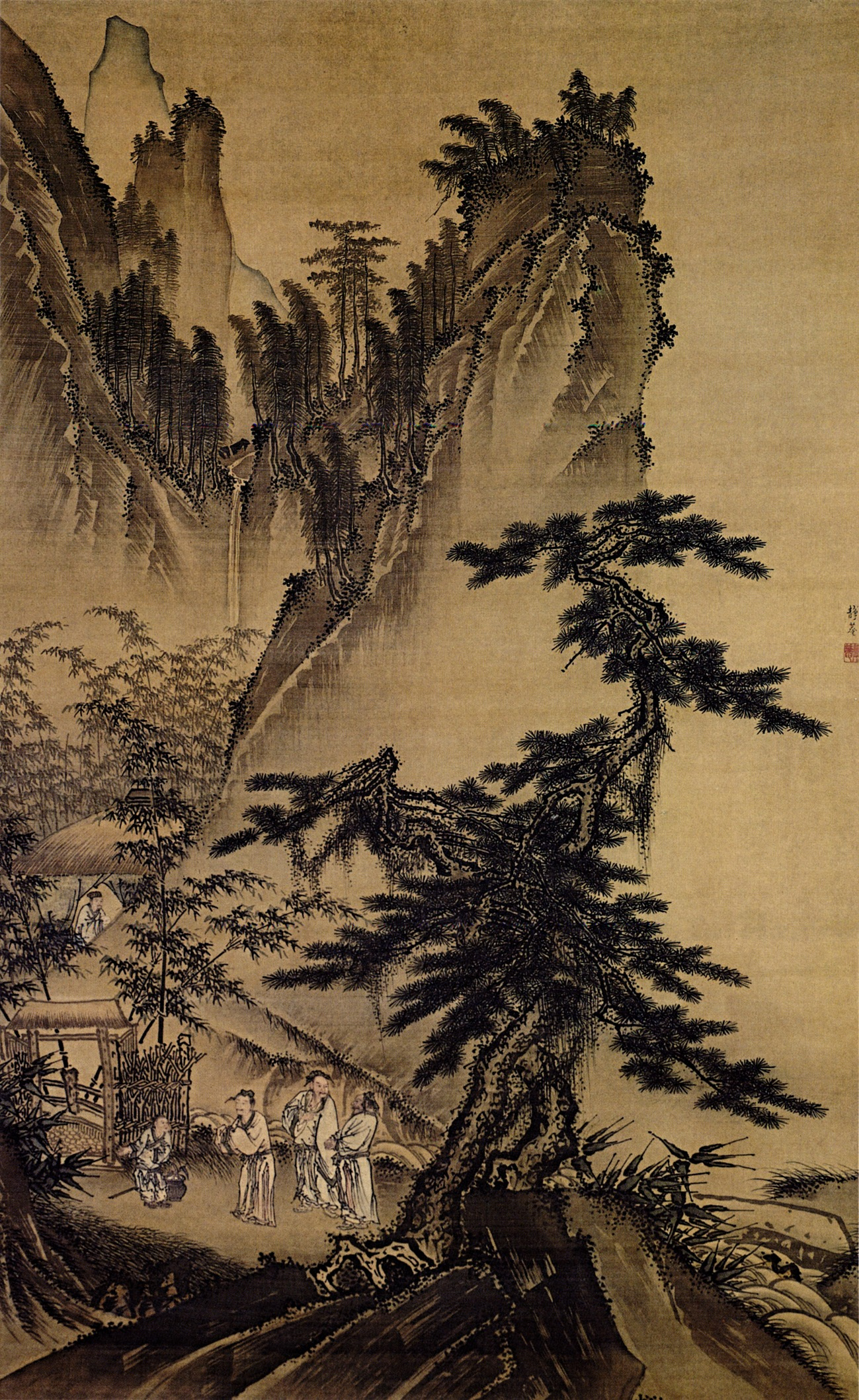
Liu Bei recruiting Zhuge Liang, from Visiting the Thatched Hut Three Times, a Ming dynasty painting by Dai Jin (1388–1462).

Liu Bei and his oath brothers Guan Yu and Zhang Fei swore allegiance to the Han Empire in the Oath of the Peach Garden and pledged to do their best for the people. However, their ambitions were not realised as they did not receive due recognition for helping to suppress the Yellow Turban Rebellion and participating in the campaign against Dong Zhuo. After Liu Bei succeeded Tao Qian as the governor of Xu Province, he offered shelter to Lü Bu, who had just been defeated by Cao Cao. However, Lü Bu betrayed his host, seized control of the province and attacked Liu Bei. After combining forces with Cao Cao to defeat Lü Bu at the Battle of Xiapi, Liu Bei followed Cao Cao back to the imperial capital, Xu, where Emperor Xian honoured him as his "Imperial Uncle" upon learning that he was also a descendant of the imperial clan. When Cao Cao showed signs that he wanted to usurp the throne, Emperor Xian wrote a secret decree in blood to his father-in-law, Dong Cheng, and ordered him to get rid of Cao Cao. Dong Cheng secretly contacted Liu Bei, Ma Teng and others, and they planned to assassinate Cao Cao. However, their plans were leaked, and Cao Cao had Dong Cheng and the others arrested and executed along with their families.

Liu Bei had already left the imperial capital when the plot was exposed, and he moved on to seize control of Xu Province from Che Zhou, the new governor appointed by Cao Cao. In retaliation, Cao Cao attacked Xu Province and defeated Liu Bei, causing him to be separated from his oath brothers. While Liu Bei briefly joined Yuan Shao after his defeat, Zhang Fei took control of a small city, and Guan Yu temporarily served under Cao Cao and helped him slay two of Yuan Shao's generals in battle. The three oath brothers were eventually reunited and managed to establish a new base in Runan, but they were defeated by Cao Cao's forces again so they retreated south to Jing Province, where they took shelter under the governor Liu Biao.

=== Battle of Guandu ===
After pacifying the nearby provinces, suppressing a rebellion by former Yellow Turbans, and consolidating power in the central government, Cao Cao turned his attention north to Yuan Shao, who had recently eliminated Gongsun Zan and now controlled most of northern China. Yuan Shao amassed a large army and camped along the northern bank of the Yellow River.

In the summer of 200, after months of preparations, Cao Cao and Yuan Shao clashed at the Battle of Guandu. Although Cao Cao was heavily outnumbered by Yuan Shao, he secured a decisive victory over his rival after launching a surprise raid on Yuan Shao's supply train and throwing the enemy into disarray. Yuan Shao retreated north after his defeat, fell ill and died about two years later. Cao Cao took advantage of Yuan Shao's death, which had resulted in internal conflict among his sons who were fighting over their father's territories, and advanced north to attack and seize all of Yuan Shao's lands. By the end of 207, after a victorious campaign beyond the frontier against the Wuhuan, Cao Cao achieved complete dominance of northern China. The territories in central and northern China which came under Cao Cao's control became the foundation of the state of Cao Wei, which would later be established by Cao Cao's son and successor Cao Pi.

=== Zhuge Liang joins Liu Bei: the three visits ===
In the meantime, Liu Biao had put Liu Bei in charge of Xinye. During this time, Liu Bei visited Zhuge Liang thrice and recruited him. (The three visits itself is a fact documented by various historic literatures including Records of the Three Kingdoms · Biography of Zhuge Liang and Chu Shi Biao (Memorial on the Northern Campaign). However, after being adapted by Romance of the Three Kingdoms, it was expanded into a marvellous and dramatic story called The Three Visits to the Thatched Cottage, which had been a house-hold classic all over China.) Acting on Zhuge Liang's advice, Liu Bei built up his forces in preparation for war against Cao Cao. Following his unification of central and northern China under his control, Cao Cao, having been appointed Imperial Chancellor by Emperor Xian, led his forces on a southern campaign to eliminate Liu Bei and Sun Quan. By then, Liu Biao had died and his younger son Liu Cong decided to surrender control of Jing Province to Cao Cao.

In 208, although Liu Bei managed to repel two attacks by Cao Cao at Xinye, he was eventually forced to flee due to the overwhelming strength of the enemy forces. Cao Cao and his cavalry caught up with Liu Bei and his forces at Changban and defeated them. During the battle, Liu Bei's generals Zhao Yun and Zhang Fei displayed heroics: the former fought his way through enemy lines to rescue Liu Bei's infant son Liu Shan and deliver him safely back to his father; the latter single-handedly held off enemy forces at a bridge by intimidating and staring them down. Liu Bei and his forces managed to rendezvous with Guan Yu, who had left earlier to seek help from Liu Biao's elder son Liu Qi, and they retreated to Xiakou.

=== Battle of Red Cliffs ===
In 208, Liu Bei dispatched Zhuge Liang on a diplomatic mission to Jiangdong to meet Sun Quan and discuss forming a Sun–Liu alliance to counter Cao Cao. Although Sun Quan was initially hesitant due to many of his followers advising him to surrender to Cao Cao, he ultimately made up his mind to ally with Liu Bei, placing Zhou Yu in command of his forces to prepare for the upcoming war. Zhuge Liang temporarily remained in Jiangdong to assist Zhou Yu, who sensed that Zhuge Liang posed a future threat to his lord. Zhou Yu attempted to outwit and kill Zhuge Liang, but failed and had no choice but to cooperate with the latter. The Sun–Liu forces scored a decisive victory over Cao Cao at the Battle of Red Cliffs.

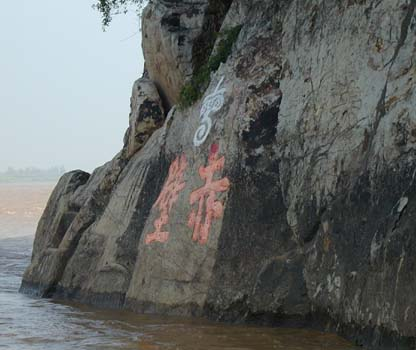
Traditional site of the Red Cliffs.

Sun Quan and Liu Bei started vying for control of southern Jing Province after their victory, but Liu Bei won and took over the territories from Cao Cao's general Cao Ren. Sun Quan, unhappy over having gained nothing, sent messengers to ask Liu Bei to "return" the territories to him, but Liu Bei dismissed the messenger each time with a different excuse. Sun Quan was unwilling to give up, so he followed Zhou Yu's plan to trick Liu Bei to come to Jiangdong to marry his sister Lady Sun and then hold Liu Bei hostage in exchange for Jing Province. However, Zhuge Liang foiled Zhou Yu's plot, and the newlywed couple returned to Jing Province safely. Zhou Yu later died in frustration after Zhuge Liang repeatedly thwarted his moves to take Jing Province.

=== Liu Bei's takeover of Yi Province ===
Relations between Liu Bei and Sun Quan deteriorated after Zhou Yu's death, but not to the point of war. Following Zhuge Liang's Longzhong Plan, Liu Bei led his forces westward into Yi Province and seized control of the territories from the governor Liu Zhang. By then, Liu Bei ruled over a vast stretch of land from Yi Province to southern Jing Province; these territories served as the foundation of the state of Shu Han later. Liu Bei declared himself King of Hanzhong after defeating Cao Cao in the Hanzhong Campaign and capturing Hanzhong Commandery.

At the same time, Emperor Xian awarded Cao Cao the title of a vassal king – King of Wei – while Sun Quan was known as the Duke of Wu. In eastern China, Sun Quan and Cao Cao's forces fought in various battles along the Yangtze River, including the battles of Hefei and Ruxu, but neither side managed to gain a significant advantage over the other.

=== Death of Guan Yu ===
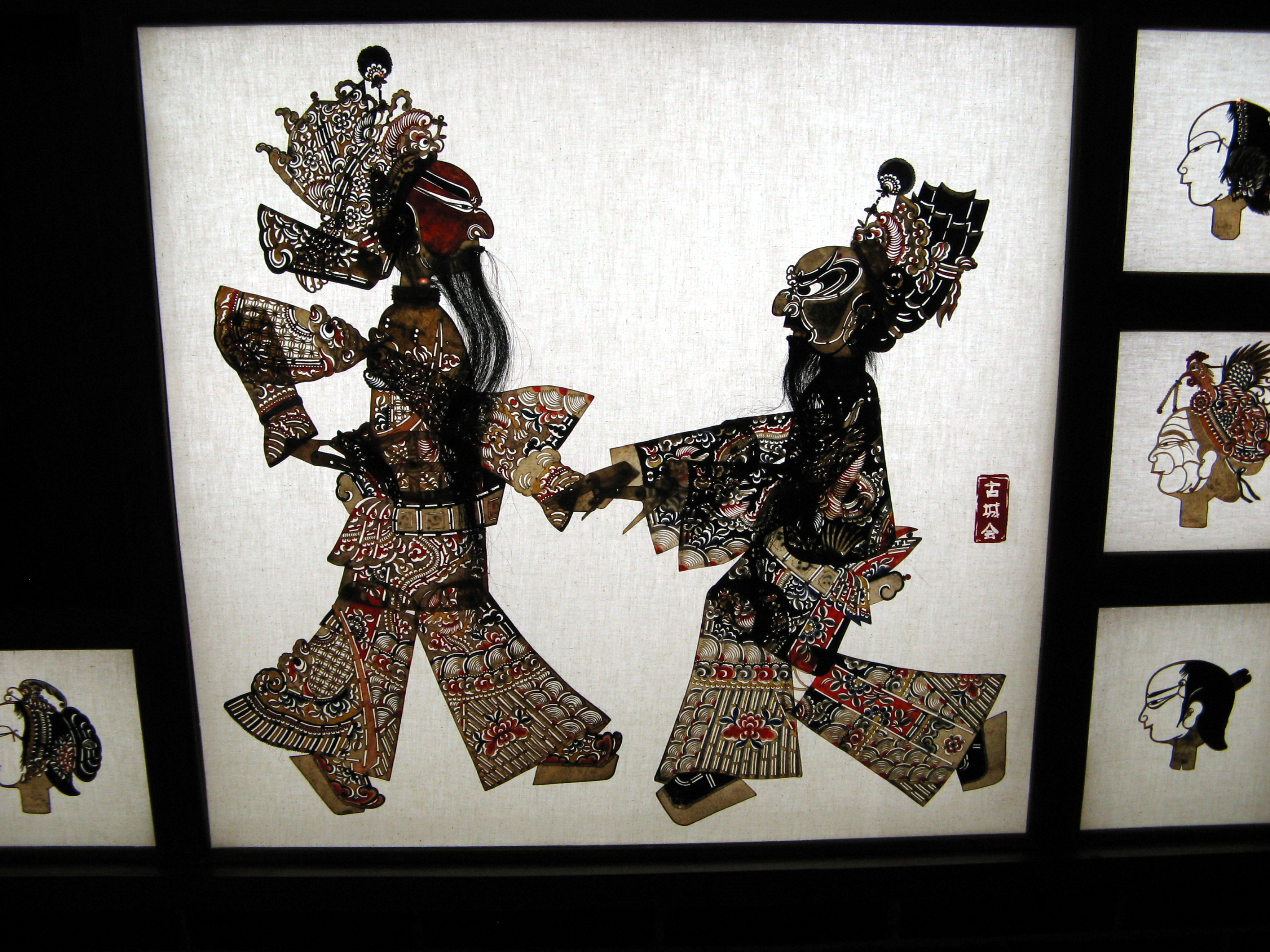
Shadow puppets in the Sichuan Provincial Museum depicting Guan Yu and Zhang Fei.

Meanwhile, Sun Quan plotted to take Jing Province after growing tired of Liu Bei's repeated refusals to hand over the territories. He secretly made peace and allied with Cao Cao against Liu Bei. While Guan Yu, who guarded Liu Bei's territories in Jing Province, was away attacking Cao Ren at the Battle of Fancheng, Sun Quan sent his general Lü Meng to launch a stealth invasion on Jing Province. Guan Yu was unable to capture Fancheng so he retreated, but was caught off guard by Lü Meng and had already lost Jing Province before he knew it. With his army's morale falling and the troops gradually deserting, Guan Yu and his remaining men withdrew to Maicheng, where they were surrounded by Sun Quan's forces. In desperation, Guan Yu attempted to break out of the siege but failed and was captured in an ambush. Sun Quan had him executed after he refused to surrender.

Shortly after Guan Yu's death, Cao Cao died of a brain tumour in Luoyang. His son and successor, Cao Pi, forced Emperor Xian to abdicate the throne to him and established the state of Cao Wei to replace the Han dynasty. About a year later, Liu Bei declared himself emperor and founded the state of Shu Han as a continuation of the Han dynasty. While Liu Bei was planning to avenge Guan Yu, Zhang Fei was assassinated in his sleep by his subordinates.

=== Battle of Yiling ===
As Liu Bei led a large army to avenge Guan Yu and retake Jing Province, Sun Quan attempted to appease him by offering to return him the territories in southern Jing Province. Liu Bei's subjects urged him to accept Sun Quan's offer but Liu Bei insisted on avenging his oath brother. After initial victories against Sun Quan's forces, a series of strategic mistakes resulted in Sun Quan's general Lu Xun inflicting a calamitous defeat on Liu Bei at the Battle of Yiling. Lu Xun initially pursued Liu Bei during his retreat, but gave up after getting trapped inside and barely escaping from Zhuge Liang's Stone Sentinel Maze.

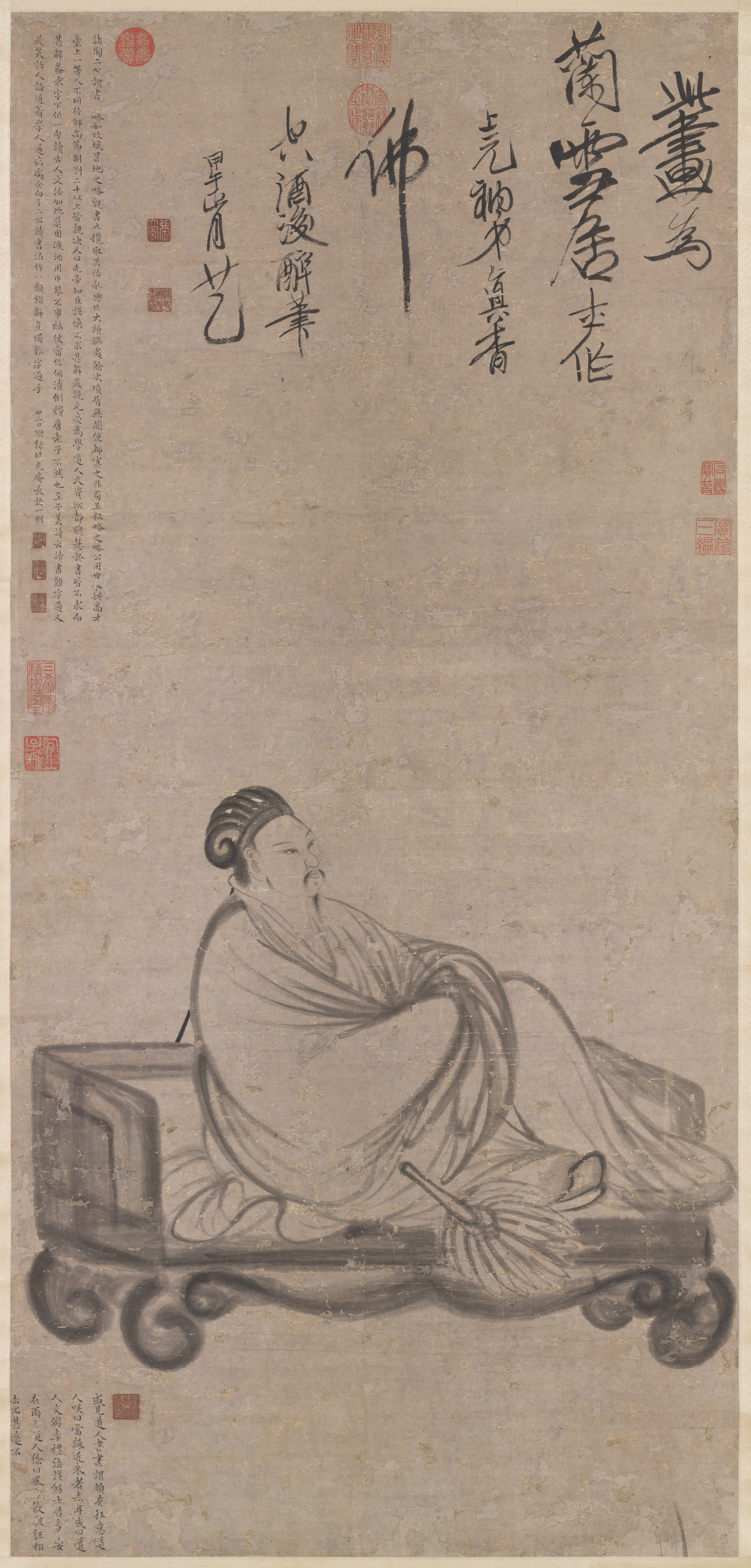
An artist's impression of Zhuge Liang.

Liu Bei died in Baidicheng from illness a few months later. On his deathbed, Liu Bei granted Zhuge Liang permission to take the throne if his son and successor, Liu Shan, proved to be an inept ruler. Zhuge Liang firmly refused and swore to remain faithful to the trust Liu Bei had placed in him.

=== Zhuge Liang's campaigns ===
After Liu Bei's death, Cao Pi induced several forces, including Sun Quan, a turncoat Shu general Meng Da, the Nanman and Qiang tribes, to attack Shu, in coordination with a Wei army. However, Zhuge Liang managed to make the five armies retreat without any bloodshed. He also sent Deng Zhi to make peace with Sun Quan and restore the alliance between Shu and Wu. Zhuge Liang then personally led a southern campaign against the Nanman, defeated them seven times, and won the allegiance of the Nanman king Meng Huo.

After pacifying the south, Zhuge Liang led the Shu army on five military expeditions to attack Wei as part of his mission to restore the Han dynasty. Each time, as Zhuge Liang was on the verge of success, he was recalled due to various unfortunate circumstances, such as Liu Shan listening to rumours spread by eunuchs. Moreover, his days were numbered because he had been suffering from chronic illness and his condition worsened under stress. He died of illness at the Battle of Wuzhang Plains while leading a stalemate battle against the Wei general Sima Yi.

=== End of the Three Kingdoms ===
The long years of battle between Shu and Wei saw many changes in the ruling Cao family in Wei. The influence of the Caos weakened after Cao Rui's death and state power eventually fell into the hands of the regent Sima Yi and subsequently to his sons, Sima Shi and Sima Zhao.

In Shu, Jiang Wei inherited Zhuge Liang's legacy and continued to lead another nine campaigns against Wei for three decades, but ultimately failed to achieve any significant success. The Shu emperor Liu Shan also turned out to be an incompetent ruler who trusted corrupt officials. Shu gradually declined under Liu Shan's rule and was eventually conquered by Wei forces. Jiang Wei attempted to restore Shu with the help of Zhong Hui, a disgruntled Wei general, but their plan failed and Zhong Hui was killed by Wei troops while Jiang Wei died by suicide. Shortly after the fall of Shu, Sima Zhao died and his son, Sima Yan, forced the last Wei emperor, Cao Huan, to abdicate the throne to him. Sima Yan then established the Jin dynasty to replace the state of Cao Wei.

In Wu, there had been internal conflict among the nobles since Sun Quan's death. The regents Zhuge Ke and Sun Chen consecutively attempted to usurp the throne but were eventually ousted from power and eliminated in coups. Although stability was temporarily restored in Wu, the last Wu emperor, Sun Hao, turned out to be a tyrant. Wu, the last of the Three Kingdoms, was eventually conquered by the Jin dynasty. The fall of Wu marked the end of the near century-long era of civil strife historically known as the Three Kingdoms period.

== Historical accuracy ==
The novel draws from Chen Shou's Records of the Three Kingdoms as the main historical source. Other major influences include Liu Yiqing's A New Account of the Tales of the World (Shishuo Xinyu), published in 430, and the Sanguozhi Pinghua, a chronological collection of eighty fictional sketches starting with the peach garden oath and ending with Zhuge Liang's death.

Some 50 or 60 Yuan and early Ming plays about the Three Kingdoms are known to have existed, and their material is almost entirely fictional, based on thin threads of actual history. The novel is thus a return to greater emphasis on history, compared to these dramas. The novel also shifted towards better acknowledgement of southern China's historical importance, while still portraying some prejudice against the south. The Qing dynasty historian Zhang Xuecheng famously wrote that the novel was "seven-parts fact and three-parts fiction." The fictional parts are culled from different sources, including unofficial histories, folk stories, the Sanguozhi Pinghua, and also the author's own imagination. Nonetheless, the description of the social conditions and the logic that the characters use is accurate to the Three Kingdoms period, creating "believable" situations and characters, even if they are not historically accurate.

Romance of the Three Kingdoms, like the dramas and folk stories of its day, features Liu Bei and his associates as the protagonists; hence the depiction of the people in Shu Han was glorified. The antagonists, Cao Cao, Sun Quan and their followers, on the other hand, were often denigrated. This suited the political climate in the Ming dynasty, unlike in the Jin dynasty when Cao Wei was considered the legitimate successor to the Han dynasty.

Some non-historical scenes in the novel have become well-known and subsequently became a part of traditional Chinese culture.

== Literary analysis ==
In a literary analysis of the novel, Yao Yao focuses on the way the Mao edition interlaces the stories told about the three kingdoms in a way designed to highlight the relationships among the story elements. Yao Yao uses the analogy of a rope: "juxtaposed and reasonably developed strands of narrative become interlaced". Maos' invention of literary devices is made evident in numerous comparisons of the Mao edition with Chen Shou's historic account the Records of the Three Kingdoms, which was an important source, as well as the Li Zhuowu edition (also referred to as the Jiajing edition).

The title of the Mao edition, San Guo Zhi Tongsu Yan Yi (Popular Romance of the Records of the Three Kingdoms includes the qualifier, "Yan Yi", (conventionally translated as "Romance") to indicate that it is an amplification of the earlier work. The best example of this amplification is the depiction of Zhuge Liang's southern campaign. The campaign was actually a single action which Chen Shou described in a few sentences. The Mao edition greatly expands the action into seven battles in which Meng Huo, the rebel leader, is captured and released seven times. The expanded story (told in chapters 87–89) underscores "Zhuge's endless effort to restore the Han Dynasty". As described by Yao, "The author uses freely the vast store of early tradition, written and oral. He integrates reality and invention (history and fiction) in order to form a single story".

The Mao edition and Li Zhuowu editions have similarities and differences with respect to chapter structure. The Li Zhuowu edition has 240 chapters ("hui") each with a single story and title, these were grouped into 120 pairs. Odd-number chapters ended in stock phrases such as "Can he survive?" or "Let's see how he will defeat the enemy?". Even-number chapters often ended with "What's next? We will find out in the following 'hui' ". Thus, each pair of chapters presents a story written in chronological order.

On the other hand, the Mao edition has 120 chapters, each with two interlaced stories (sometimes with other short stories inserted). The titles are couplets, one line for each of the major stories. The interlacing of the stories (with somewhat less regard to their chronology) illuminates the parallels or contrasts between them which the Maos had carefully highlighted.

Prose and poems are also interlaced. The poems typically reaffirm, or question points made by the narrator becoming, in essence, a secondary narrator. Poems are often used to increase the universality of specific points made by the main narrator. Poems were also used to break the narrative flow and are placed at the end of chapters to summarize events and to transition to the next chapters.

Yao Yao includes an example from Chapter 79 of the Mao edition which illustrates the interlacing of two plots within a chapter and the interlacing of poetry and prose. Chapter 79 includes two stories one describes Liu Bei's attempt to punish two generals who had refused aid to Guan Yu which led to his death. One of the generals was his adopted son, whom he felt compelled to execute. Soon thereafter, in Chapters 82–84), he gathers all his forces and engages with those of Sun Quan in the Battle of Yiling where he is totally defeated.

The other story (which is the first of the two) describes how Cao Pi (Cao Cao's initial successor) attempts to kill his more talented and scholarly younger brother, Cao Zhi, out of fear that Cao Zhi might be a threat to his leadership. He orders Cao Zhi to compose a poem in the time required to take seven steps. If he fails, he will be executed. Cao Zhi successfully composes a poem that "describes two bulls fighting and colliding against each other. One is pushed past the edge and falls into a dry well, where it dies".

Cao Pi is not satisfied and requires a second poem. This time Cao Zhi composes the more widely quoted Quatrain of Seven Steps which describes cooking beans over a fire built with dry bean stems. The beans exclaim: "Alive we sprouted from a single root—/ What is your rush to cook us on the fire". Cao Pi takes the poem to heart and allows Cao Zhi to go free.

The first poem about the bulls foreshadows Liu Bei's downfall; the second, Cao Pei's mistreatment of his brother. The second poem "also reinforces the link between the two halves of this chapter by bringing out the irony: on the one hand, Liu Bei gives up all he has to avenge a sworn brother; on the other hand, Cao Pei will not be satisfied until he can find a way to put his blood brother to death". The chapter concludes with the poem: "The Shrines of Wei were about to be established;/ The land of Han was about to pass into another's hands".

The Mao's themselves also comment on the interlacing of the stories in their opening essay as follows (translator annotation omitted and romanizations standardized to pinyin):

Cao Pi's cruel oppression of the living Cao Zhi is a case of conflict between brothers of the same blood, whereas Liu Bei's grievous lamentation over the dead Guan Yu is a case of brotherly love between men of different surnames. [...] Examples such as those enumerated above, some of which are analogous and some of which are contrasting, all parallel each other within a single chapter.

Elsewhere the Maos comment that such interlacing may occur in a single chapter or in some cases "at a distance across several tens of intervening chapters".

Yao Yao goes on to discuss other key components of the work including: the rise and fall of states and individuals in the novel, the lack of continuity between generations, the individual development and complexity of major characters and the interlacing of themes by repetition.

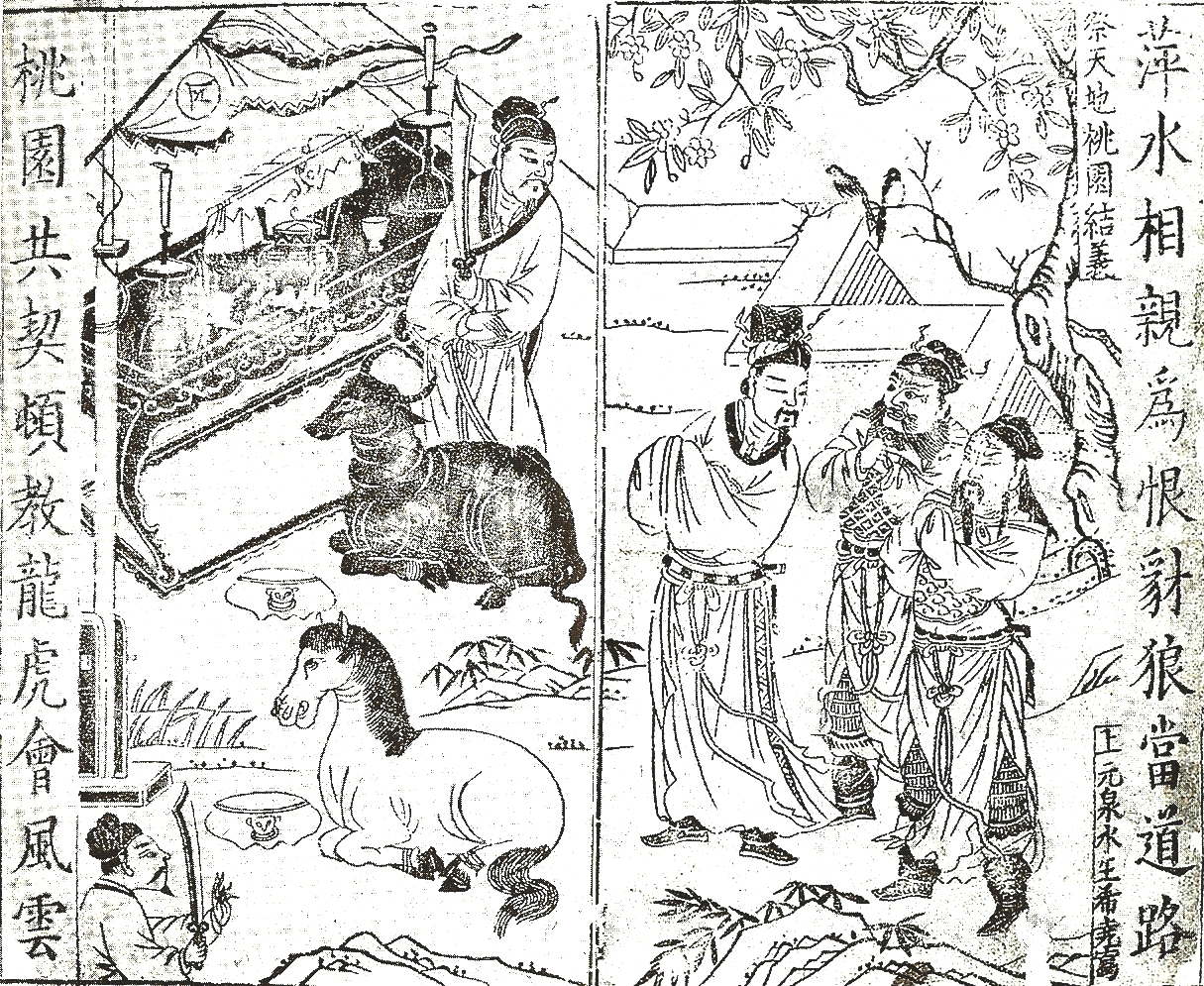
Illustration from a 1591 edition of the novel, "Peach Garden Oath of Brotherhood", depicting the heroes with a black bull and white horse sacrificed in the ceremony.

In the introduction to the 1959 reprint of the Brewitt-Taylor translation, Roy Andrew Miller argues that the novel's chief theme is "the nature of human ambition", to which Moody adds the relationship between politics and morality, specifically the conflict between the idealism of Confucian political thought and the harsh realism of Legalism, as a related theme. Other dominant themes of the novel include: the rise and fall of the ideal liege (Liu Bei); finding the ideal minister (Zhuge Liang); the conflict between the ideal liege (Liu Bei) and the consummate villain (Cao Cao); and the cruelties and injustice of feudal or dynastic government. Lu Xun remarks in A Brief History of Chinese Fiction that "Luo Guanzhong wished to make Liu Bei a kindly man, but draws a character who seems a hypocrite. Wanting to depict Zhuge Liang's wisdom, he makes him appear a sorcerer. His only success is in the portrayal of Lord Guan Yu, who is a gallant general to the life".

The opening lines of the novel, "The empire, long divided, must unite; long united, must divide. Thus it has ever been", added by Mao Lun and Mao Zonggang in their recension, epitomise the tragic theme of the novel. One recent critic notes that the novel takes political and moral stands and lets the reader know which of the characters are heroes and which villains, yet the heroes are forced to make a tragic choice between equal values, not merely between good and evil. The heroes know that the end of the empire is ordained by this cosmic cycle of division and unity, yet their choices are moral, based on loyalty, not political.

Plaks states the novel deals with the "cyclical theories of dynastic decline," and relates the "breakdown of order" at the end of the Han dynasty to "the improper exercise of imperial authority, the destabilisation influence of special-interest groups (eunuchs, imperial clansmen), the problem of factional and individual idealism carried to the point of civil strife-all of which eventually surface in the body of the narrative." He goes on to say, the "overlapping claims to legitimacy and multiple spheres of power," give the novel a "sense of epic greatness" with its "combination of grandeur and futility."

== Cultural impact ==
Besides the famous Peach Garden Oath, many Chinese proverbs in use today are derived from the novel:

Translation	Chinese	Interpretation
Brothers are like limbs, wives and children are like clothing. Torn clothing can be repaired; how can broken limbs be mended?	simplified Chinese: 兄弟如手足，妻子如衣服。衣服破，尚可缝； 手足断，安可续？; traditional Chinese: 兄弟如手足，妻子如衣服。衣服破，尚可縫； 手足斷，安可續？	It means that wives and children, like clothing, are replaceable if lost but the same does not hold true for one's brothers (or friends).
Liu Bei "borrows" Jing Province – borrowing without returning.	simplified Chinese: 刘备借荆州——有借无还; traditional Chinese: 劉備借荆州——有借無還 simplified Chinese: 刘备借荆州，一借无回头; traditional Chinese: 劉備借荆州，一借無回頭	This proverb describes the situation of a person borrowing something without the intention of returning it.
Speak of Cao Cao and Cao Cao arrives.	simplified Chinese: 说曹操，曹操到; traditional Chinese: 說曹操，曹操到 simplified Chinese: 说曹操曹操就到; traditional Chinese: 說曹操曹操就到	Equivalent to speak of the devil. Describes the situation of a person appearing precisely when being spoken about.
Three reeking tanners [or cobblers] (are enough to) overcome one Zhuge Liang.	simplified Chinese: 三个臭皮匠，胜过一个诸葛亮; traditional Chinese: 三個臭皮匠，勝過一個諸葛亮 simplified Chinese: 三个臭皮匠，赛过一个诸葛亮; traditional Chinese: 三個臭皮匠，賽過一個諸葛亮 simplified Chinese: 三个臭裨将，顶个诸葛亮; traditional Chinese: 三个臭裨将，頂個諸葛亮	This proverb expresses the idea that the collaboration of people working together maybe more effective than one intelligent person working alone. One variation is "subordinate generals" (simplified Chinese: 裨将; traditional Chinese: 裨將; píjiàng) instead of "tanners" (皮匠; píjiàng).
Eastern Wu arranges a false marriage that turns into a real one.	simplified Chinese: 东吴招亲——弄假成真; traditional Chinese: 東吳招親——弄假成真	When a plan to falsely offer something backfires with the result that the thing originally offered is appropriated by the intended victim of the hoax.
Losing the lady and crippling the army.	simplified Chinese: 周郎妙计安天下，赔了夫人又折兵; traditional Chinese: 周郎妙計安天下，賠了夫人又折兵	The "lady" lost here was actually Sun Quan's sister Lady Sun. Zhou Yu's plan to capture Liu Bei by means of a false marriage proposal failed and Lady Sun really became Liu's wife (see above). Zhou Yu later led his troops in an attempt to attack Liu Bei but fell into an ambush and suffered a crushing defeat. This saying is now used to describe situations where schemers makes a fools of themselves and suffer double losses.
Every person on the street knows what is in Sima Zhao's mind.	simplified Chinese: 司马昭之心，路人皆知; traditional Chinese: 司馬昭之心，路人皆知	As Sima Zhao gradually rose to power in Wei, his intention to usurp state power became more obvious. The young Wei emperor Cao Mao once lamented to his loyal ministers, "Every person on the street knows what is in Sima Zhao's mind (that he wanted to usurp the throne)." This saying is now used to describe a situation where a person's ill-intention is obvious.
The young should not read Water Margin, and the old should not read Three Kingdoms.	simplified Chinese: 少不读水浒, 老不读三国; traditional Chinese: 少不讀水滸, 老不讀三國	The former depicts the lives of heroic outlaws and their defiance of the corrupted government system but results in bittersweet tragedy. The latter presents dynasties that came and go which reminds the old that nothing is permanent.

The writing style adopted by Romance of the Three Kingdoms was part of the emergence of written vernacular during the Ming period, as part of the so-called "Four Masterworks" (si da qishu).

=== Buddhist aspects ===
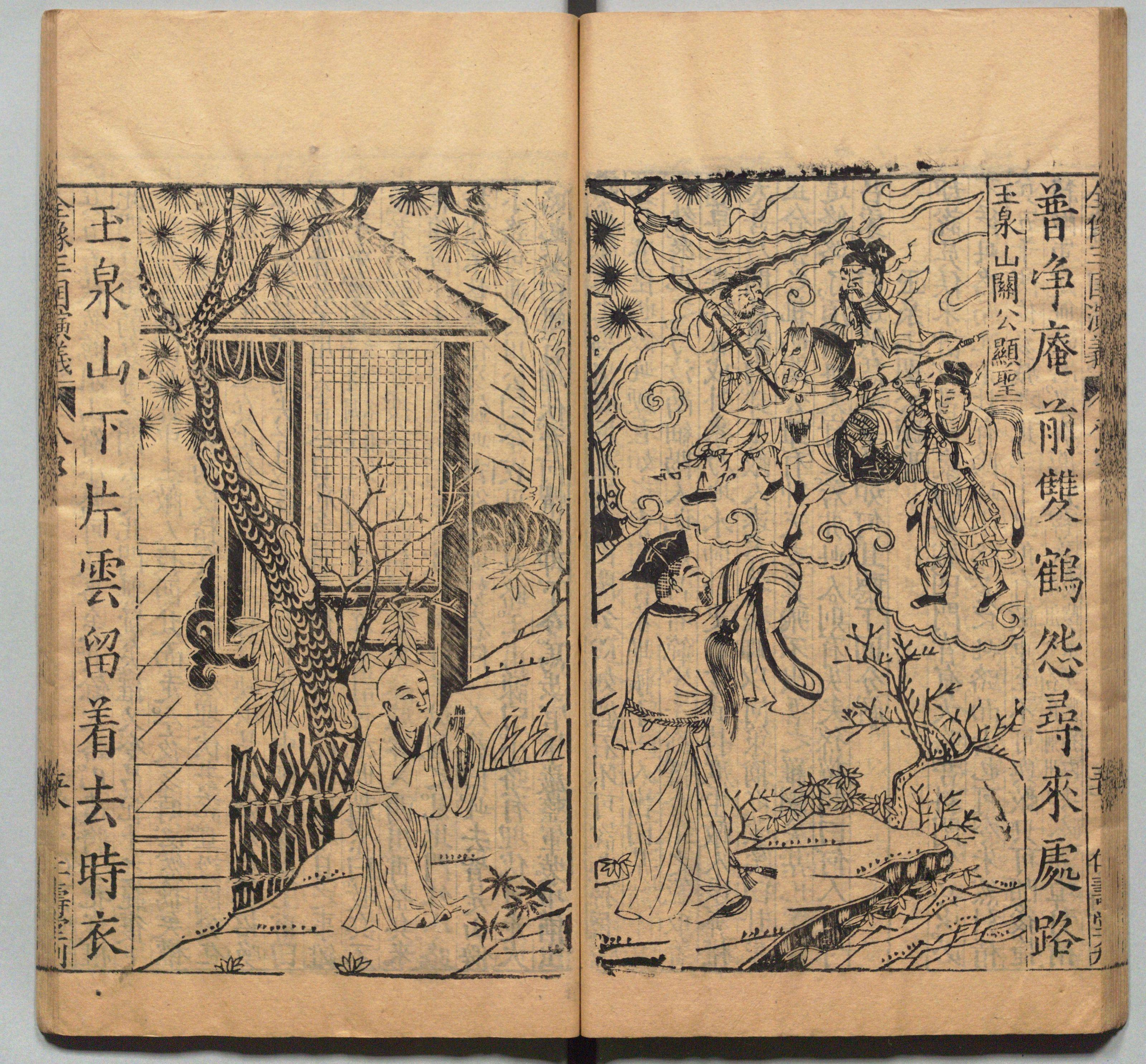
Illustration from a 1591 edition of the novel: "On Jade Spring Mountain, Lord Guan reveals his sanctity" which depicts the apparition of Lord Guan [left, mounted on Red Hare] appearing to Monk Pujing [with deer tail whisk].

The famous Tiantai monk Zhiyi, established a monastery at Jade Spring Mountain in Hubei, in the sixth century. "Historical" records claimed that he had to overcome a local dragon deity before it could be built. Fortuitously, the monastery was located near the burial place of Guan Yu, where there was a local cult that held him as a deity. Over time interactions with the local people led the monks to elevate Guan Yu as a supernatural being, referring to him as Lord Guan. A story was developed that he had aided in construction of the monastery. In Romance of the Three Kingdoms the association of Guan Yu and the monastery was included in the narrative. In the novel, Guan Yu, was beheaded on orders from Sun Quan. His spirit appears to the Monk Pujing and asks him to return his head. Pujing reminds him of the generals he had beheaded. Guan Yu's sprit comprehends and disappears (chapter 77). The popularity of the novel then caused the original story of the dragon to be "largely pushed out of sight". Lord Guan is still reverenced today as a Bodhisattva in Buddhist tradition.

=== Adaptations ===
The story of the Romance of the Three Kingdoms has been retold in numerous forms including television series, manga, video games and fan fiction.

=== Fan fiction ===
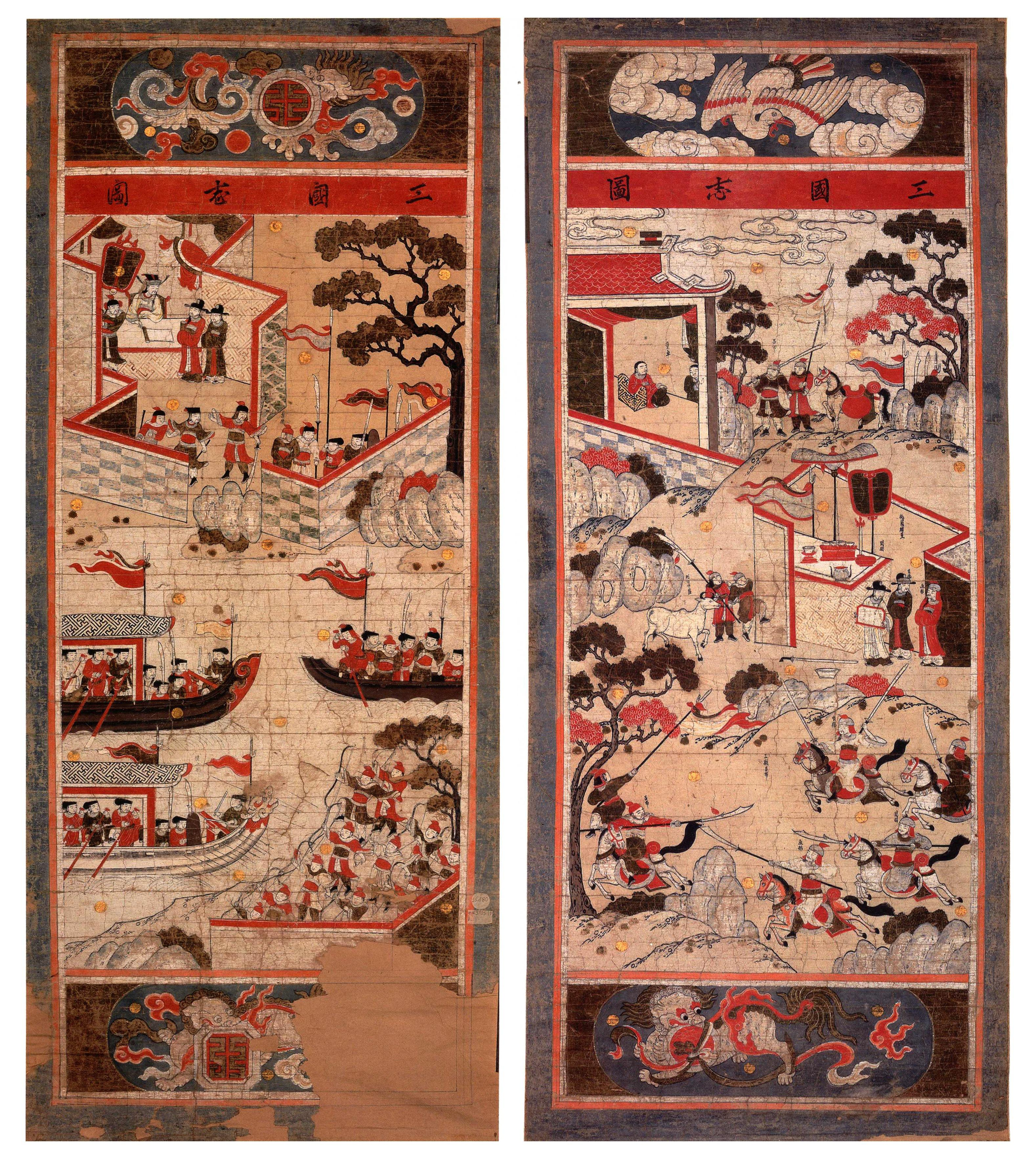
Vietnamese paintings of scenes from the Romance of the Three Kingdoms, from Độc Lôi temple, Nghệ An, circa 1750-1784

Fan fiction about Romance of the Three Kingdoms is a form of online cultural adaptation of the novel. As with many fan fiction works, the main producers and consumers are young women, and in this case, young Chinese women. Scholars argue that the emergence of this type of adaptation was motivated by the marginalization and heavily stereotyped female characters as well as unexplored plotlines in the original text. The Battle of the Red Cliff and Liu Bei's answer after Guan Yu and Zhang Fei complained about his growing intimacy with Zhuge Liang are two scenes containing such plotlines.

Common couples derived from Romance of the Three Kingdoms include Liu Bei/Zhuge Liang, often referred to as Xuan/Liang, and Cao Cao/Guan Yu, or Cao/Guan. Both follow the dominant/submissive structure typical of "slash fiction"/"boys' love" (BL), are closely tied to the original story and often require the reader to be familiar with the work the fan fiction is derived from.

Liu Bei's tendency to share his bed with good friends like Guan Yu, Zhang Fei and Zhao Yun popularized the trope in which one character watches another male's body in sleep. The vulnerability associated with this trope goes hand in hand with the use of adjectives associated with female beauty to physically describe submissive characters like Zhuge Liang. According to scholars, this practice was popularized by the idea of "soft-masculinity" in contemporary China and now reinforces this same "soft-masculinity". Finally, the progressiveness of Romance of the Three Kingdoms fan fiction comes from the transformation of the political discourse into a sexual discourse and from the pleasure derived from producing and consuming fan fiction.

== Translations ==
=== Manchu ===
The Jurchen chieftain Nurhaci was an avid reader of the Romance of the Three Kingdoms, learning all he knew about Chinese military and political strategies from them. Thus, when his descendants founded the Qing dynasty and became the rulers of China, the book was one of the first Chinese books to be translated into their Manchu language along with military manuals. Indeed, it is one of only two Chinese novels that had a Manchu translation put into print during the Qing dynasty (the other being Jin Ping Mei).

A Manchu translation of the Romance, known in Manchu as Ilan gurun-i bithe (ᡳᠯᠠᠨ
ᡤᡠᡵᡠᠨ ᡳ
ᠪᡳᡨᡥᡝ), was first attempted in 1631 by the eminent scholar Dahai (1595–1632), but he died the following year before it could be finished. A complete translation based on the 1522 edition of the novel was done in 1647 and published in 1650 by a team of high-ranking officials including Kicungge (祁充格; d. 1651) and Fan Wencheng (1597–1666), commissioned by the prince-regent Dorgon. This is the first translation of the Romance that could be dated with certainty in any language.

The Manchu translation was itself translated into a number of languages including Xibe, Mongolian, Korean, Tibetan and French. It was also back-translated into Chinese in a bilingual Manchu-Chinese edition during the Yongzheng period (1723–1735).

The French translation, San-koué-tchy (Ilan kouroun-i pithé): Histoire des Trois Royaumes (1845–1851), by Théodore Pavie was the first translation of the novel into a European language. This French translation was initially intended to include the full novel, but only two volumes of a planned multi-volume set were published. Volume 2 ends with the preparation for the Battle of Fankou, corresponding to Chapter 35 in the Mao edition. Pavie also published one of the novel's stories, the execution of Yu Ji by Sun Ce, as a novella in 1851.

=== Korean ===
The Romance of the Three Kingdoms has achieved the utmost "canonical status" in Korea, Japan, and Vietnam. It was and is to this day massively popular in Korea where it has been modified and re-created to reflect cultural agendas. It has even been called "the national novel of Korea", and author Hyuk-chan Kwon adopted that designation in his 2023 book, How Three Kingdoms Became a National Novel of Korea: From Sanguozhi Yanyi to Samgukchi [i.e. from the Chinese to the Korean].

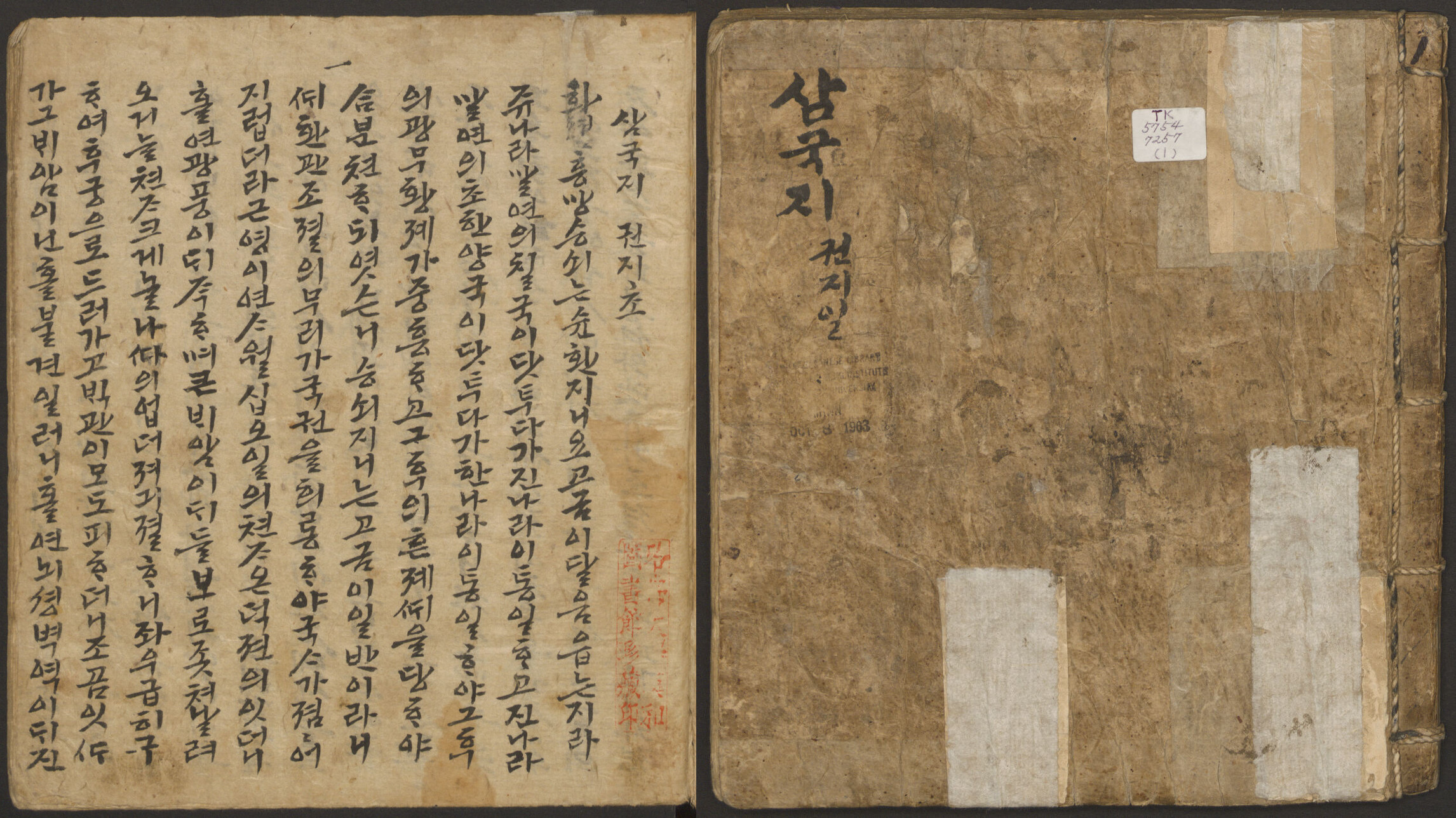
Rental copy of Romance of the Three Kingdoms, Vol. 1, 1906: cover with binding and first page. Handwritten in vernacular Korean.

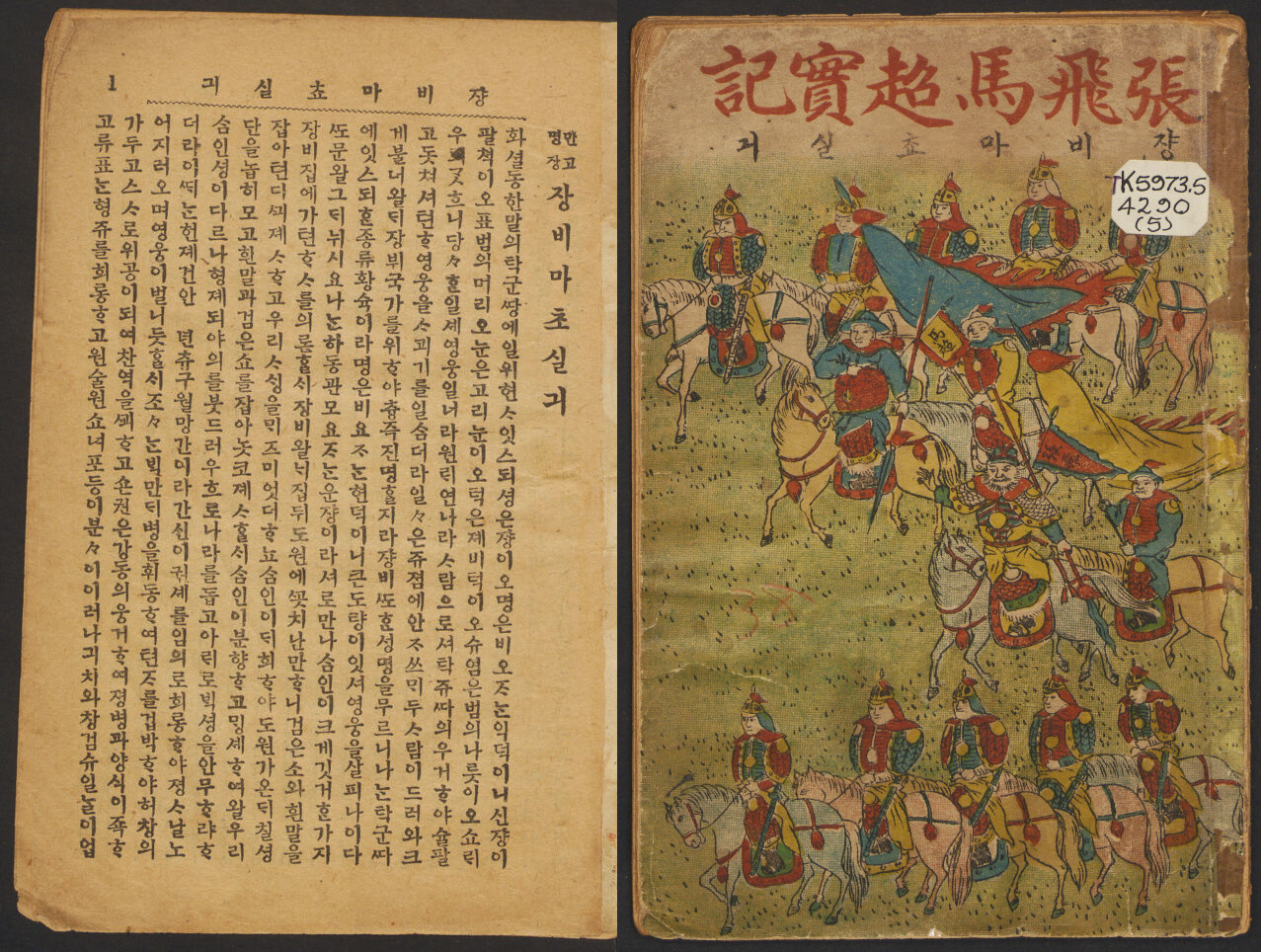
The True Story of Zhang Fei and Ma Chao Guangdong Bookstore, Beijing, 1919: cover and first page. Printed in vernacular Korean with metal type.

The Records of the Three Kingdoms (Chen Shou's original historical chronicle) was imported to Korean kingdoms of Goguryeo and Goryeo. A commentary by Kim Pusik from 1145 CE praised the ruler-subject relationship of Liu Bei and Zhuge Liang. During the Joseon dynasty, the novel Romance of the Three Kingdoms became widespread as hand-written manuscripts and wooden block prints. Rental copies were affordable and popular. Ttakchibon editions (printed with metal type) loosely based on selected parts of the novel, also became available. Chang Pa Ma Cho [The True Story of Zhang Fei and Ma Chao], for example, is based on Chapters 27 to 73. It greatly overemphasizes their prowess by having them do feats originally carried out by Guan Yu and Zhao Zilong.

However, there was resistance to the novel (and fiction in general) among the yangban [ruling class] literati for its historical inaccuracies and entertaining style. For example, Neo-Confucian scholar Ki Taesŭng (1527–1572) admonished King Seonjo not to read it, calling it "a collection of trivial sayings edited by some rascals". He was particularly critical of stories of Zhang Fei making ten thousand soldiers flee by producing one shout, as well as the Diaochan and Red Cliffs stories.

However, acceptance of the novel dramatically improved following the Imjin War (when Joseon Korea was invaded by the Japanese) and the Qing invasion. The invasions created a surge of nationalism, and the novel became popular among all literate classes.

Modern translations of the novel were initiated during the Japanese colonial period when a translation by Eiji Yoshikawa (first serialized in 1939) was circulated in Japan and Korea. Yi Mun-yol published a version in Korean in 1988. As of 2023, his translation of Romance of the Three Kingdoms has sold over 20 million copies, making it Korea's number one best-selling novel of all time.

The Eiji Yoshikawa and Yi Mun-yol versions were not mere simple translations. The Yoshikawa version has samurai overtones. For example, while Luo Guanzhong does not continue the story of Diaochan beyond the assassination of Dong Zhuo by Lü Bu (chapter 9), Yoshikawa extends the story and has her commit suicide to protect her honor." On the other hand, an extension her story by Yi depicts her as "an earthy and licentious woman rather than a martyr who sacrifices her chastity for the greater good".

In Korea, Guan Yu has become venerated in Buddhist tradition largely due to his representation in the Romance of the Thee Kingdoms. This differs from the circumstance in China where Buddhists began veneration of Guan Yu centuries earlier. When a Chinese army was sent to Korea during the Imjin War to repel the Japanese invasion, the Ming generals insisted that the Koreans build a shrine to Guan Yu. The Korean leaders were opposed but forced to comply.

Nevertheless, as the war continued, the Koreans began to look to Guan Yu for help on the battlefield. Folk stories about his help were compiled into the novel Imjin nok. In one of the stories, a leader of the Japanese army has a dream in which Guan Yu appears. His speech to the daimyo includes the lines:

I am Marquis of Shouting, Kuan Yunch'ang [Guan Yu], of the Three Kingdoms of the past. I am now entrusting myself to the state of Chosŏn [Joseon] to weather out the storm. Barbaric Japanese bandits, how dare you invade Chosŏn? When I beheaded the commanders of five passes, hundreds of thousands of heroes all died at my hands. … If you do not wish to meet sudden death, evacuate your position and retreat at once.

— Hyuk-Chan Kwon (2023)

The reference to the five passes is based on the story in the novel in which Guan Yu kills six of Cao Cao's generals guarding five passes (chapter 27) — not the historical record.

After the war, the Ming Emperor required construction of a second, much grander temple. Construction of the second one, Dongmyo [the East Lord Guan temple] (still extant), was extraordinarily expensive and caused great hardship. Decades later, the Joseon rulers recognized the Guan Yu cult as a legitimate religion. Because of his heroic qualities, contemporary Koreans continue to accept Guan Yu as a "national hero".

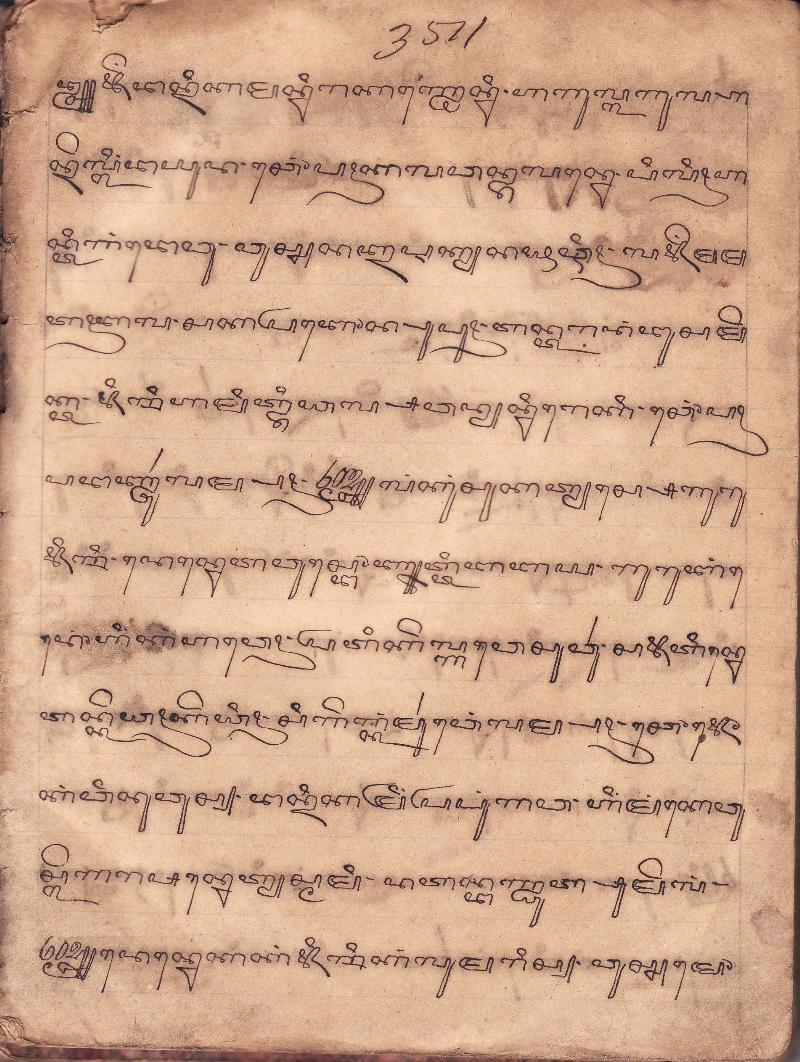
A translated version of Romance of the Three Kingdoms in Javanese, from early 20th-century Indonesia

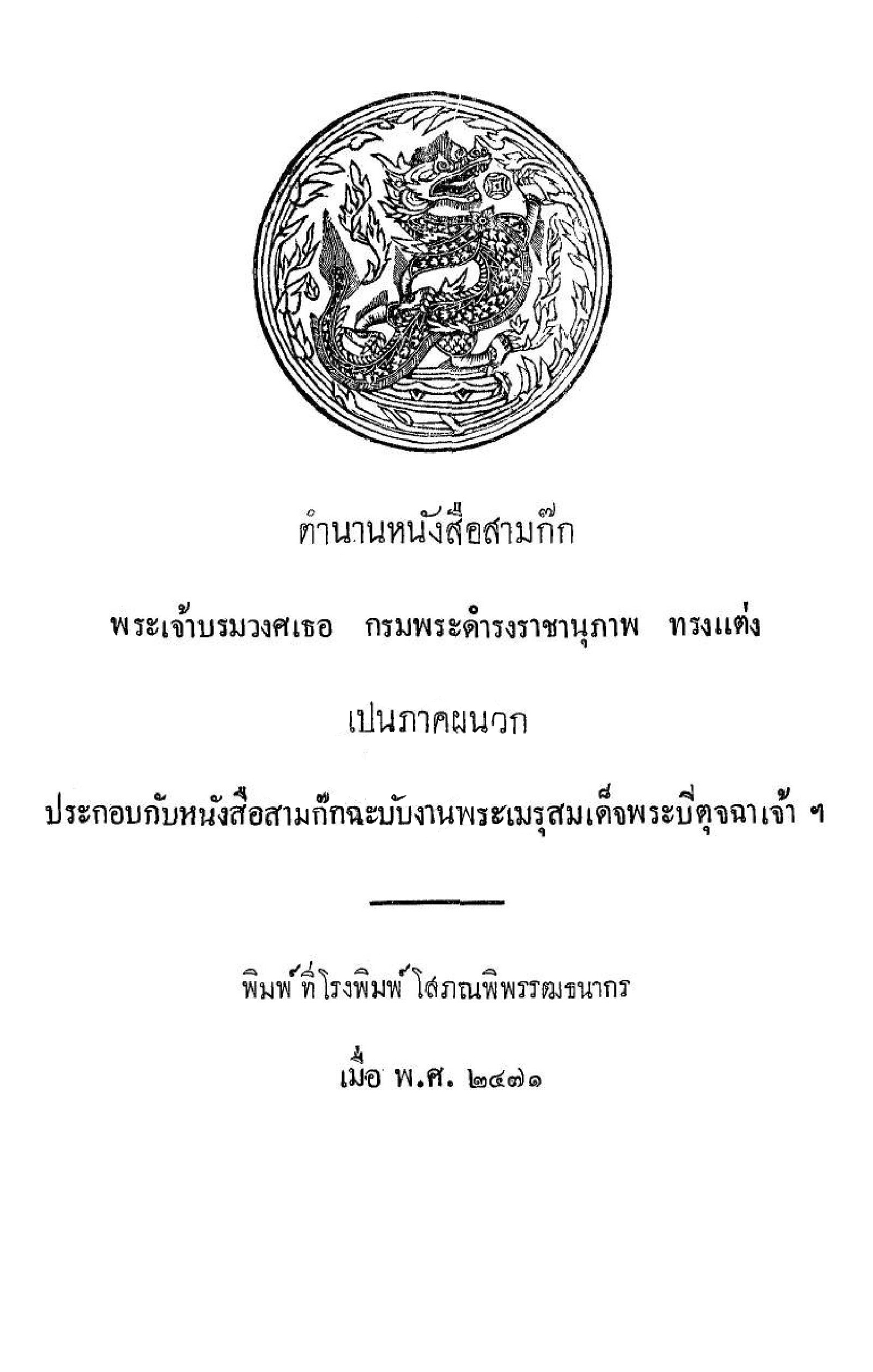
The cover of a 1928 Thai language appendix of the novel titled History of the Romance of the Three Kingdoms, with notes by Prince Damrong Rajanubhab, from the Royal Society of Thailand. Romance of the Three Kingdoms has been described as having "a tremendous impact on the Thai worldview".

=== English ===
The Romance of the Three Kingdoms has been translated into English a number of times.

==== Excerpts ====
The first known translation was performed in 1907 by John G. Steele and consisted of a single chapter excerpt that was distributed in China to students learning English at Presbyterian missionary schools. Translations intended for British readers were published as journal articles. Jia Fang and Yanfang Hou list six journals with translations or introductions from 1816 to 1906. The first of these to include a translation, The Death of the Celebrated Minister Tung-cho [Dong Zhuo], was published by Peter P. Thoms. It was serialized in The Asiatic Journal and Monthly Miscellany in three articles in 1920 and 1921, covering Chapters 8 and 9 of the novel. Thoms, a self-taught printer for the East India Company, was stationed in Macau. He considered it his mission to be mediator and a teacher of Chinese culture for the English. He misunderstood the Romance as history instead of a fictional novel, and modified the text to make it more accessible and educational to his readers.

Herbert A. Giles included an excerpt in his 1923 Gems of Chinese Literature. Z. Q. Parker published a 1925 translation containing four episodes from the novel including the events of the Battle of Red Cliffs, while Yang Xianyi and Gladys Yang published excerpts in 1981, including chapters 43–50.

==== Abridged ====
In 1976, Moss Roberts published an abridged translation of the novel, presenting approximately one-fourth of the original text. This edition featured maps and over 40 woodblock illustrations derived from three Chinese versions of the work. Designed to be accessible to college students and general readers, Roberts' abridgment employed a mixed approach: translating entire chapters, providing partial translations of others, and summarizing the remainder in italicized text. This translation includes approximately 100 pages of endnotes, detailed maps, and an extensive essay by Roberts discussing the text and its context.

In 2018, Penguin Classics released a new abridged translation by Martin Palmer, assisted by He Yun, Jay Ramsay, and Victoria Finlay. Palmer's version covers the full narrative by including at least portions of all 120 chapters, ensuring continuity without gaps in the story. Unlike Roberts' earlier approach, Palmer translated only the most significant episodes in full while summarizing the rest.

==== Unabridged ====
A complete and faithful translation of the novel was published in two volumes in 1925 by Charles Henry Brewitt-Taylor, a long time official of the Chinese Maritime Customs Service. The translation was well written, but lacked any supplementary materials such as maps or character lists that would aid Western readers; a 1959 reprint was published that included maps and an introduction by Roy Andrew Miller to assist foreign readers.

After decades of work, Moss Roberts published a full translation in 1991 complete with an afterword, eleven maps, a list of characters, titles, terms, and offices, and almost 100 pages of notes from Mao Zonggang's commentaries and other scholarly sources. Roberts's complete translation remains faithful to the original; it is reliable yet still matches the tone and style of the classic text. Yang Ye, a professor in Chinese Literature at the UC Riverside, wrote in Encyclopedia of Literary Translation into English (1998) that Roberts's translation "supersedes Brewitt-Taylor's translation and will no doubt remain the definitive English version for many years to come". Roberts's translation was republished in 1995 by the Foreign Languages Press without the illustrations.

In 2014, Tuttle published a new, three-volume translation of the novel, translated by Yu Sumei and edited by Ronald C. Iverson. According to its publisher, this translation is an unabridged "dynamic translation" intended to be more readable than past English translations of the novel.

== See also ==
- Lists of people of the Three Kingdoms, list of historical people significant to the Three Kingdoms period (220–280)
- List of fictional people of the Three Kingdoms, list of fictional people of the Three Kingdoms period (220–280)
- List of fictitious stories in Romance of the Three Kingdoms
- Military history of the Three Kingdoms
- Timeline of the Three Kingdoms period

== References and further reading ==
- Anonymous (2016). Records of the Three Kingdoms in Plain Language. Translated by Idema, W. L.; West, Stephen H. Indianapolis, IN; Cambridge, MA: Hackett Publishing. ISBN 9781624665233. Translation of the 13th century anonymous Sanguozhi pinghua.
- Besio, Kimberly; Tung, Constantine, eds. (2007). Three Kingdoms and Chinese Culture. Albany: State University of New York Press. ISBN 978-0-7914-8049-6.. Essays on this novel's literary aspects, use of history, and in contemporary popular culture.
- Hsia, Chih-tsing (1996) [1968]. "The Romance of the Three Kingdoms". The Classic Chinese Novel: A Critical Introduction. Ithaca (N.Y.) New York (N.Y.): Cornell University East Asia Program. ISBN 978-1-885445-84-1.
- Li Chengli, Zhang Qirong, Wu Jingyu. Romance of the Three Kingdoms (illustrated in English and Chinese) (2008) Asiapac Books. ISBN 978-981-229-491-3
- Luo Guanzhong (1991). Three Kingdoms: A Historical Novel. Translated by Roberts, Moss. Berkeley; Beijing: University of California Press; Foreign Languages Press. ISBN 0520068211.
- Luo Guanzhong (2002) [1925]. Romance of the Three Kingdoms. Vol. 1. Translated by Brewitt-Taylor, Charles H. Introduction by Robert E. Hegel. Singapore: Tuttle Publishing. ISBN 9780804834674.
- Luo Guanzhong (2002) [1925]. Romance of the Three Kingdoms. Vol. 2. Translated by Brewitt-Taylor, Charles H. Introduction by Robert E. Hegel. Singapore: Tuttle Publishing. ISBN 9780804834681.
- Luo Guanzhong (2006). Three Kingdoms. English translation by Moss Roberts, Introduction by Shi Changyu. Beijing: Foreign Language Press. ISBN 7-119-00590-1.
- Luo Guanzhong (2014). Iverson, Ronald C. (ed.). The Three Kingdoms. Vol. 1. Translated by Yu, Sumei. Singapore: Tuttle Publishing. ISBN 9780804843935.
- Luo Guanzhong (2014). Iverson, Ronald C. (ed.). The Three Kingdoms. Vol. 2. Translated by Yu, Sumei. Singapore: Tuttle Publishing. ISBN 9780804843942.
- Luo Guanzhong (2014). Iverson, Ronald C. (ed.). The Three Kingdoms. Vol. 3. Translated by Yu, Sumei. Singapore: Tuttle Publishing. ISBN 9780804843959.
- McLaren, Anne E. (2012). "Writing History, Writing Fiction: The Remaking of Cao Cao in Song Historiography". Monumenta Serica. 60 (1): 45–69. doi:10.1179/mon.2012.60.1.003. ISSN 0254-9948. S2CID 193917398.
- Luo Guanzhong (2022). Il Romanzo dei Tre Regni, 3 vols. Italian translation by Vincenzo Cannata. Milan: Editrice Luni. ISBN 978-88-7984-765-0.
