= Charles Henry Brewitt-Taylor =

Maritime official, sinologist and translator (1857–1938)

- Born: 11 December 1857; Kingston near Lewes, England, UKGBI
- Died: 4 March 1938 (aged 80); Elie and Earlsferry, Scotland, UK
- Spouses: Alice Mary Brewitt-Taylor (m. 1880; died 1891); Ann Brewitt-Taylor (m. 1891)
- Relatives: Alexander Michie (father-in-law)

Charles Henry Brewitt-Taylor (11 December 1857 – 4 March 1938) was a British official in the Imperial Maritime Customs Service, sinologist, and translator. Brewitt-Taylor is best known for his translation of the Romance of the Three Kingdoms, the first of China's classical novels to have a complete translation into English.

== Early life ==
Brewitt-Taylor was born on 11 December 1857 in the village of Kingston near Lewes, Sussex to Charles Taylor (1820–1868), a boatman in the coastguard and former Royal Navy seaman, and Ellen Taylor (née Brewitt; 1827–1890), a dressmaker. The third of five siblings, Brewitt-Taylor was the only one of his siblings to be given his mother's maiden name.

Brewitt-Taylor's father died by suicide in 1868, after which he was educated at the Royal Hospital School. Initially pursuing naval studies, Brewitt-Taylor later switched to astronomy. In June 1879, Brewitt-Taylor took the matriculation examination at the University of London but did not attend.

== Career ==
He applied to the Royal Observatory for a post but was turned down on medical grounds. In 1880, Brewitt-Taylor went to China to teach mathematics, maritime navigation, and nautical astronomy at the Naval School at the Foochow Arsenal. The school was part of the naval dockyard which had been established to support the Self-Strengthening Movement in its goal of learning science and technology from the west. There the young man was befriended by the Vice-Consul Herbert Giles, the eminent sinologist, who encouraged him to learn Chinese.

After his house was destroyed by French artillery in the Battle of Fuzhou in 1885, Brewitt-Taylor joined the Chinese Maritime Customs Service, and was assigned in 1891 to Tianjin. During the Boxer Uprising the family was trapped in the British Minister's residence. Their home was burnt down, destroying the completed draft of his translation of the Romance of the Three Kingdoms (which he entitled San Kuo). His Chats in Chinese was published in 1901. The family was then posted to southern Yunnan, near the border with French Indo-China. Because of his frequent travel, Charles arranged for a junior officer to stay in his house to ensure its safety. The officer developed a romance with Mrs. Brewitt-Taylor, and when he resigned, Ann suffered a nervous breakdown. In 1907 she returned to England into Bethlem mental hospital in London before returning to China seven months later.

In 1908 Robert Hart. head of the Customs Service, chose Brewitt-Taylor, partly because of his Chinese scholarship, as Director of the new college established in Peking to train Chinese for the Customs Service. As part of this work, Charles prepared a two-volume Textbook of Documentary Chinese, which included study texts and material on the work of the Customs. His wife remained in Scotland, where her family maintained a house, as Brewitt-Taylor became Customs Commissioner in Mukden. His final post was in Chongqing. He retired in 1920, aged 62.

== Personal life ==
In 1880, Brewitt-Taylor married Alice Mary Brewitt-Taylor (née Vale; died 1891), who died in childbirth in 1891. The couple had two sons, Raymond, who was killed as a member of the Field Ambulance Service in World War I, and Leonard, who died in 1933 from a cancerous blood condition.

Brewitt-Taylor remarried in 1891 to Ann Brewitt-Taylor (née Michie), the daughter of Alexander Michie.

On 4 March 1938 Brewitt-Taylor died in Earlsferry, aged 80.

== Major publications ==
- Guanzhong Luo, C. H. Brewitt-Taylor, tr. San Kuo, or, Romance of the Three Kingdoms. Shanghai: Kelly & Walsh, 1925. Various reprints.
- C. H. Brewitt Taylor. Chats in Chinese. A Translation of the Tan Lun Xin Bian. Peking: Pei-T'ang Press, 1901.
- Friedrich Hirth and C. H. Brewitt-Taylor. Text Book of Modern Documentary Chinese, for the Special Use of the Chinese Customs Service. Shanghai: The Statistical Department of the Inspectorate General Customs, 1909; rpr. Taipei: Chengwen, 1968.
