= Alexander Michie =

Scottish writer, editor and businessperson (1833–1902)

- Born: 1 March 1833; Earlsferry, Scotland
- Died: 8 March 1902 (aged 69); Hotel Cecil, London, England
- Resting place: Highgate Cemetery
- Occupations: Writer; editor; businessperson
- Spouse: Ann Michie (m. 1865; died 1868)
- Children: 2
- Relatives: Charles Henry Brewitt-Taylor (son-in-law)
- Writing career
- Years active: 1853–1891
- Notable works: The Siberian overland route from Peking to Petersburg, through the deserts and steppes of Mongolia, Tartary (1864)

Alexander Michie (1 March 1833 – 8 March 1902) was a Scottish writer, editor and businessperson active in British Hong Kong and Qing China. Known for his 1864 book recounting his experiences traveling overland from Peking to Saint Petersburg, Michie also wrote books about the British experience in China and the work of Christian missionaries in the country.

== Early life and education ==
Michie was born on 1 March 1833 in Earlsferry, Fife to Alexander Michie, a weaver, and Ann Laing. Following the death of his father, Michie's mother remarried and had two more sons.

Educated at Kilconquhar School, Michie worked briefly as a bank assistant in Colinsburgh.

== China ==
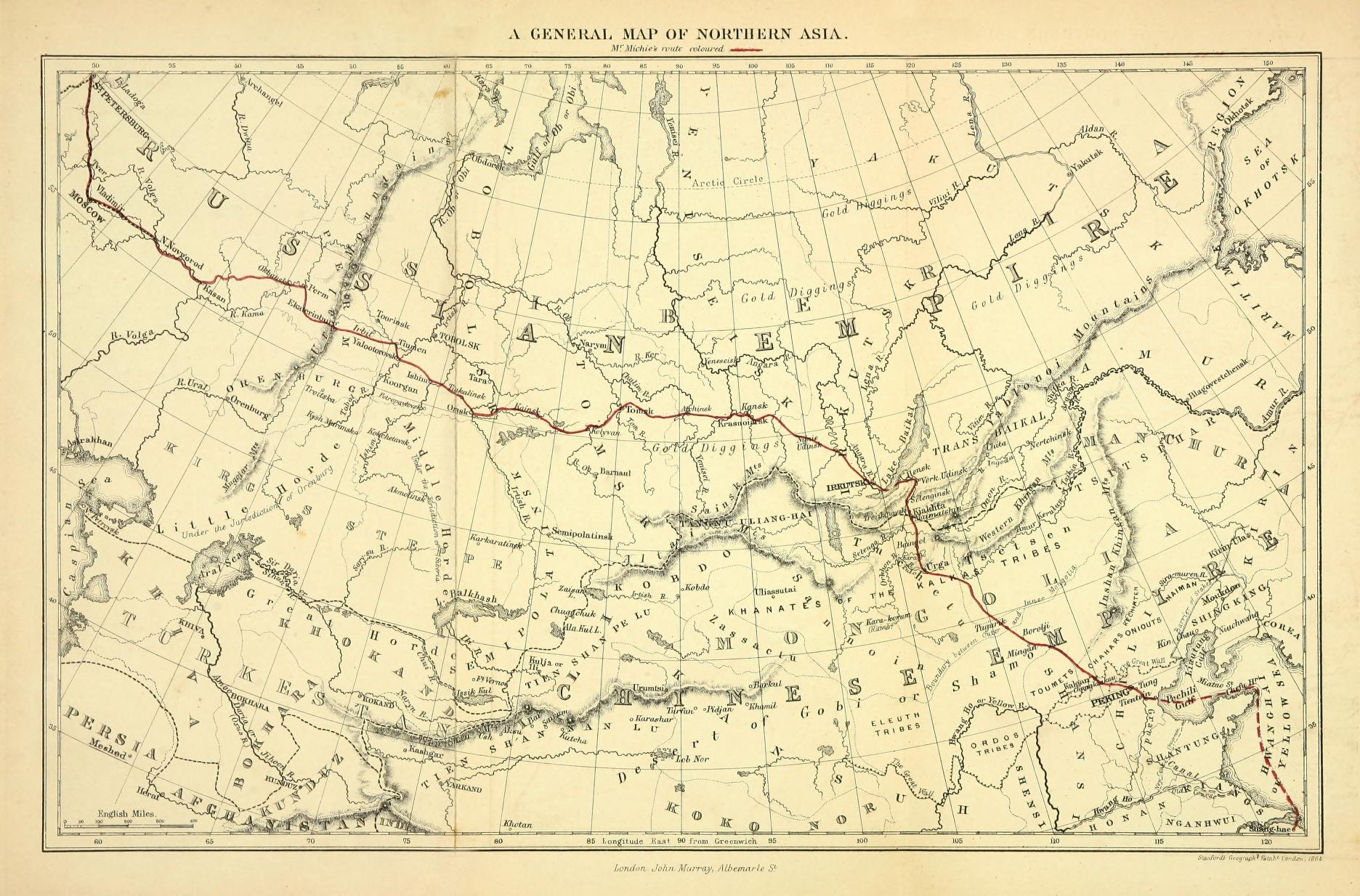
The route of Alexander Michie from Peking to St. Petersburg in 1863

In 1853, Michie left Britain and traveled to Hong Kong where he worked for Lindsay and Co., merchants. In 1857, he became a partner in the business and its representative in Shanghai. He subsequently worked for other firms and, finally, Jardine Matheson, the largest of the trading companies (Hongs) in China. He also became the Chairman of the Shanghai Chamber of Commerce and in 1862 was elected to the Shanghai Municipal Council which governed the Shanghai International Settlement.

In pursuit of commercial objectives, in 1859, Michie undertook a secret mission to cities on the Gulf of Pechihli coast in northern China, then barred to foreign visitors. In 1861, he accompanied Royal Navy Officer James Hope on an expedition up the Yangtze River to negotiate unsuccessfully for an end to the Taiping Rebellion. In 1863, Michie took a furlough and made the unusual choice to travel overland back to Britain through Russia on the Siberian Route. The journey took four months. His subsequent book, published in 1864, is his best known work and, he said, the first description of the whole journey from Peking to Saint Petersburg since John Bell's account published in 1763.

In 1866, Michie and his wife Ann returned to China. After Ann died in 1868, he sent his two children back to Britain. He visited Britain again about 1874 where he remained for a few years. By 1883, he had returned to China and was living in Tientsin where he was the Jardine Matheson representative. From 1886 to 1991, he was the editor of The Chinese Times which spread "information about foreign countries among the Chinese and about China to foreigners." In 1891, he left China to live in London. He returned to China in 1894 to attend his daughter's wedding and stayed on as a correspondent of The Times for the First Sino-Japanese War of 1894–1895. In 1901 he again visited China.

Michie never learned to speak Chinese but had many Chinese friends. Statesman Li Hung-chang said of him that it was "a positive relaxation to converse with one who had no demands to make upon him."

== Personal life ==
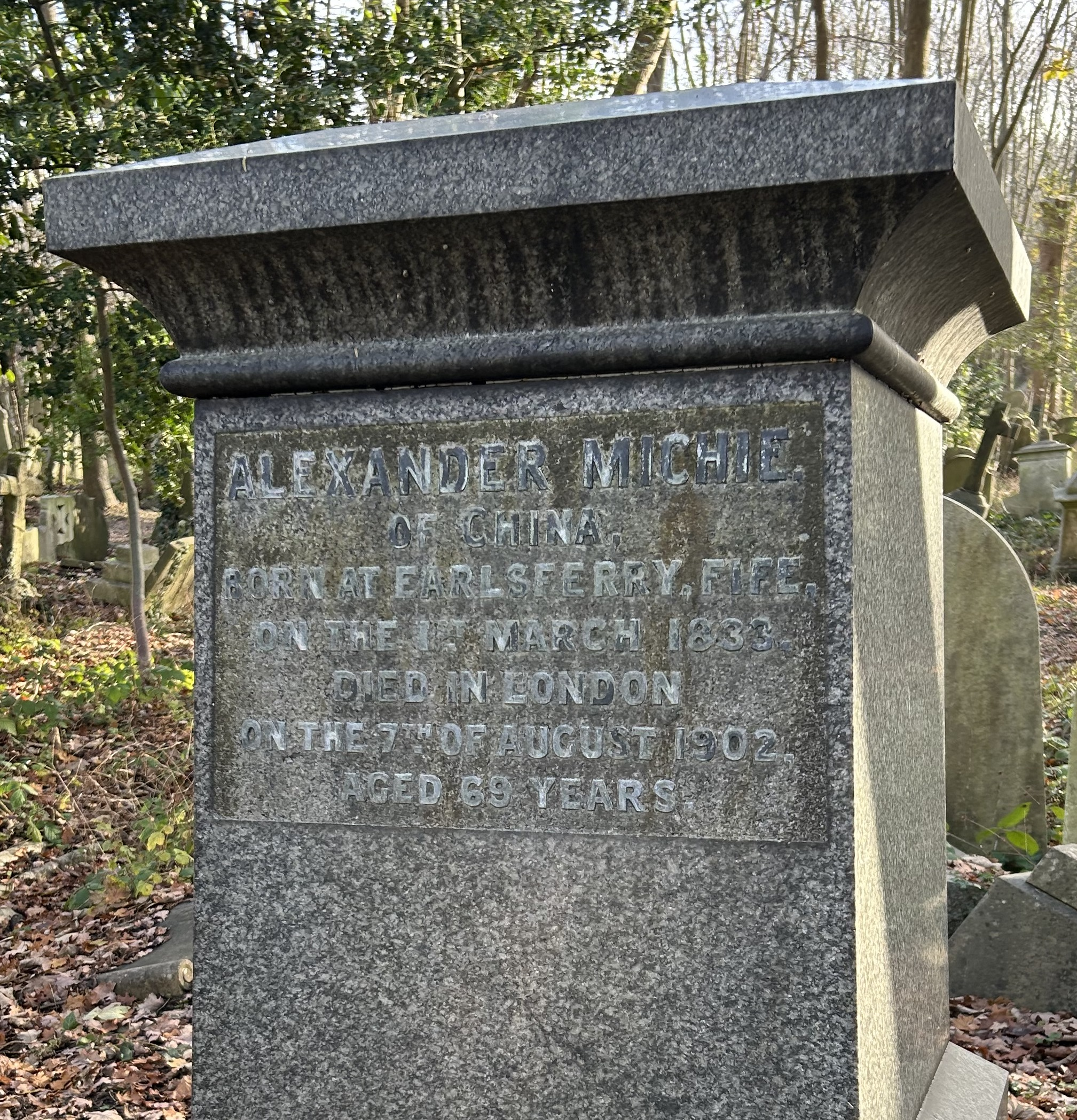
Grave of Alexander Michie in Highgate Cemetery

Michie married Ann Michie (née Robison) in London in December 1865 during his return to Britain on furlough from China. The couple returned to China in 1866. They had two children, a son, Alexander, born in 1867, who worked in the Chinese Maritime Customs Service from 1890 to 1913 and Ann Amy Jane, a daughter, born on 21 February 1868. Ann Amy Jane later married Charles Henry Brewitt-Taylor, who also worked for the Chinese Customs Service. Michie's wife, Ann, died on 8 March 1868, two weeks after giving birth to Ann Amy Jane. Michie "worshiped his wife's memory and his life for 34 years may be said to have been a long silent embodied grief." He never remarried.

In 1902, while on a train near London, Michie became ill. He was taken to the room in the Hotel Cecil where he was living and died there on 7 August 1902. He was buried in Highgate Cemetery. He left an estate of more than 22,000 Pounds sterling, a substantial sum.

== Works ==
- The Siberian overland route from Peking to Petersburg, through the deserts and steppes of Mongolia, Tartary, &c, J. Murray, (1864)
- Missionaries in China, E. Stanford, (1891)
- The Englishman in China during the Victorian Era, two volumes, W. Blackwood & sons, (1900)
- China and Christianity, Knight and Millet, (1900)
- The political obstacles to missionary success in China, Hongkong Daily Press Office (1901)
