= Ddakji =

Korean children's game

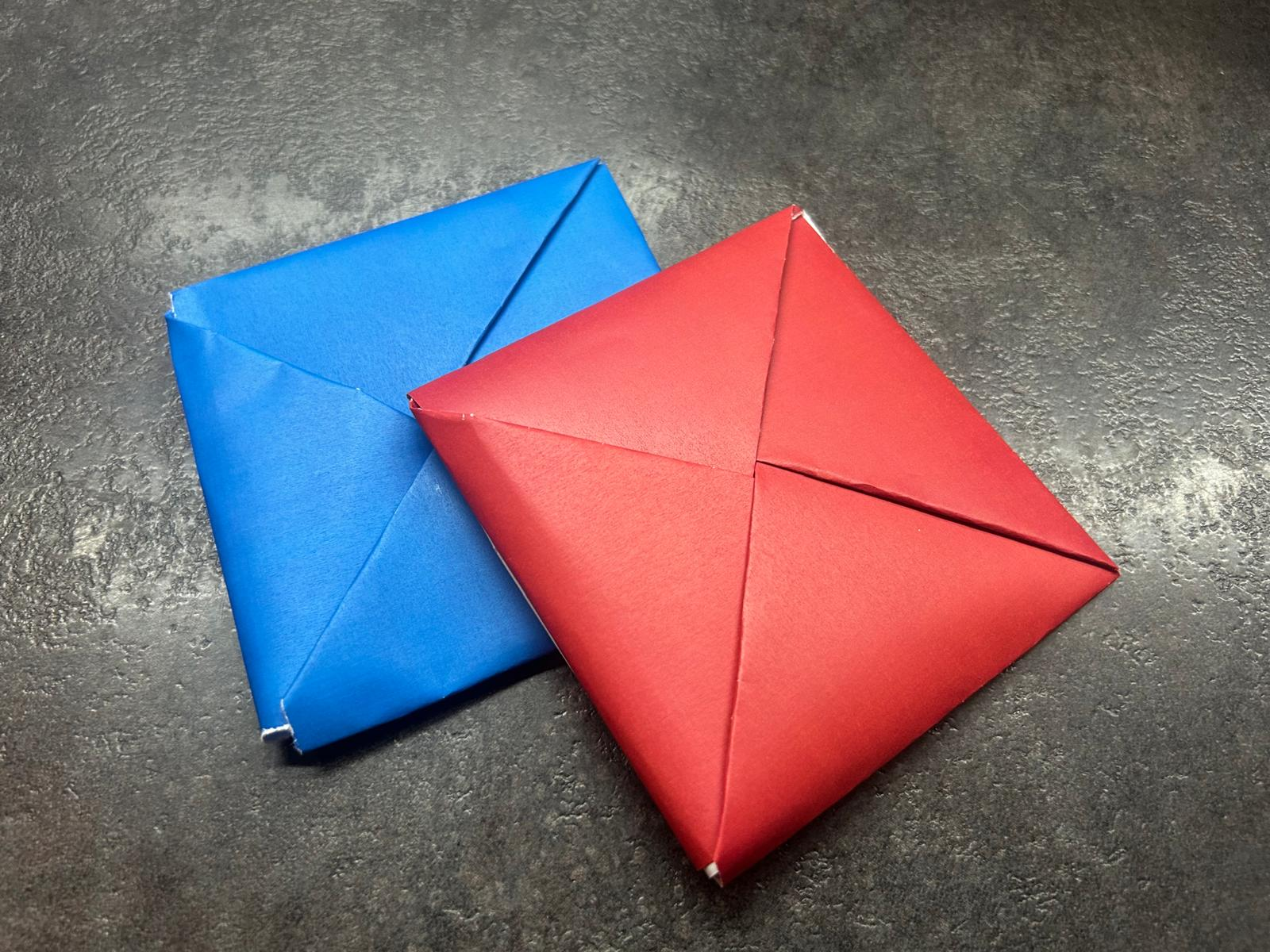
Reproduction of the ddakjis seen in the television series Squid Game, in blue and red.

Ddakji (Korean: 딱지; RR: ttakji; MR: ttakchi; IPA: [t͈a̠k̚t͡ɕ͈i]) (Note: In some dialects, it may be called ttaegi (때기), ttangji (땅지), or ppachi (빠치) or pyo (표).) is a traditional Korean toy used primarily to play variants of a category of games called ddakji chigi (딱지치기; ttakji chigi; ttakchi ch'igi; lit. 'playing/hitting ddakji'; IPA: [t͈a̠k̚t͡ɕ͈i t͡ɕʰiɡi]). They are usually made of paper and are thrown in some way during games.

The flipping variant of the game, neomgyeomeokgi, is a particularly popular variant of the game, and has even achieved some international popularity, particularly due to its featuring in the popular 2021–2025 television series Squid Game.

The game has been played since at latest the 1392–1897 Joseon period, and is played in both North Korea and South Korea. In South Korea, the game was particularly popular amongst school children in the late 20th century. While it is traditional to make one's own ddakji by folding paper, pre-made round ddakji with cartoon characters printed on them have also been popular.

== Description ==
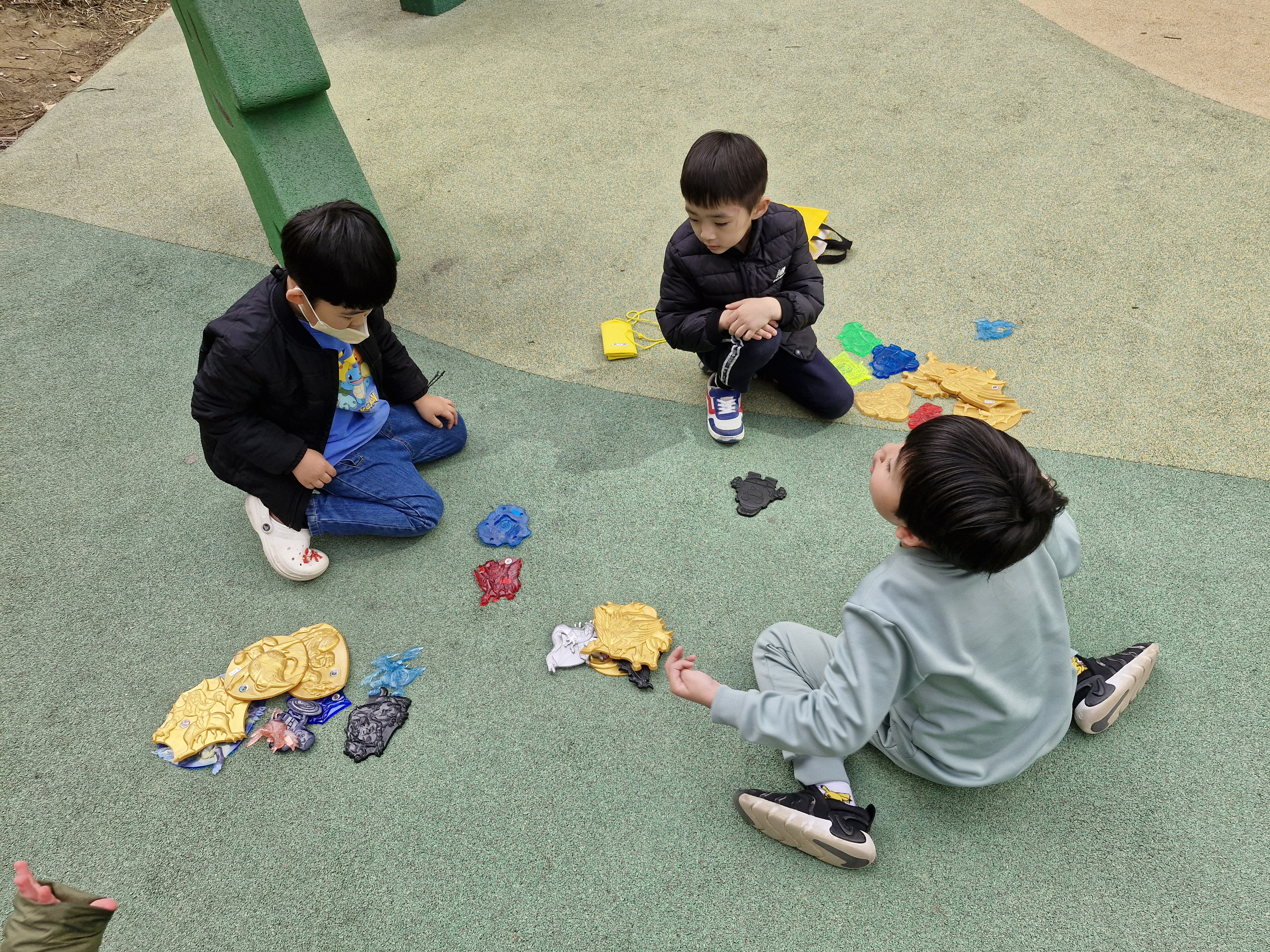
Children in South Korea playing ddakji chigi with plastic toys in the 2020s.

Ddakji are usually made by folding thick paper into a square, rectangular, or round shape. Other shapes are also possible, including hexagons and pentagons. They can be made of various materials, often whatever disposable and foldable materials are immediately available to the players. They can be decorated with various drawings, or be folded from paper with designs already printed on them. Ddakji that are especially big can be nicknamed wang ddakji (왕딱지; lit. 'king ddakji').

The various properties of ddakji, especially their shape, thickness, and weight, result in different properties in the various possible ddakji chigi games. Players would use alternate throwing techniques based on these characteristics, and create their own ddakji to enhance certain properties.

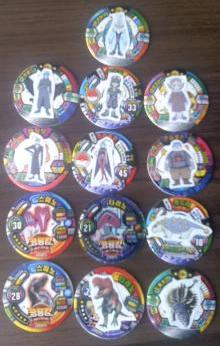
Ddakji featuring characters of the media franchise Dinosaur King.

In South Korea, ready-made ddakji are also sometimes sold. From the 1970s to 1990s, round ddakji with cartoon characters printed on them were popular. Some ddakji are made of plastic or metal, and thus cannot be easily created by players themselves. Players can agree to give away ddakji if they lose a game played with it; if such ddakji were purchased, this added a financial dimension to losing the game, and added suspense.

== Ddakji chigi ==
Ddakji chigi is a general term for games involving ddakji; each of these variants can have entirely different objectives and activities. For extra suspense, losers can be subjected to punishments. The games can be played indoors or outdoors, although boys playing the game in an empty lot outdoors was reportedly historically a common sight.

=== Neomgyeomeokgi ===
Neomgyeomeokgi (넘겨먹기; lit. 'flipping') is a popular variant of the game. It is played between at least two players, who each have a ddakji. The goal of the game is to flip the ddakji of the other player(s) before one's own becomes flipped. Players play rock paper scissors to determine turn order. The loser(s) put their ddakji down, typically on the ground. Following the turn order, each player takes and throws their ddakji down in such a way that it flips the ddakji of an opponent; this is usually achieved by throwing it hard. The owners of flipped ddakji can be considered losers of the game, although the game can be played indefinitely without explicit losers or winners.

One popular technique is to place one's foot next to the target ddakji. This is supposed to aid in flipping. Techniques sometimes aim to manipulate displaced air to move other ddakji. This reportedly has resulted in some players attempting to cheat by covertly generating air flow using their clothes or body and not with the ddakji.

==== Neomgyeomeokgi variants ====
There are additional rules and variants of neomgyeomeokgi. One such additional rule is creating a boundary for the play area, where ddakji that move out of bounds are disqualified. Another possible rule is if a thrown ddakji lands underneath another ddakji, the upper ddakji is eliminated. Also, if a ddakji lands on top of another, the upper can be considered eliminated. Another possible variation is having an order that ddakji must be flipped in. The order can be indicated in writing on the ddakji, even by using terms like military ranks.

=== Other games with ddakji ===
- Nallyeomeokgi (날려먹기; lit. 'flying') describes various games involving throwing ddakji horizontally and not downwards. One variant has players attempting to throw their ddakji furthest away. Another involves players trying to make their thrown ddakji land at some specific place.
- Byeokchigi (벽치기; lit. 'hitting a wall') is where players bounce their ddakji off a wall. Players who can make their ddakji land furthest away from the wall win.
- Mireonaegi (밀어내기; lit. 'pushing') (Note: Alternatively mireochigi (밀어치기).) is played in a boundary. Each player begins with one ddakji in their hand, and one or more ddakji inside the boundary. They take turns throwing their ddakji in such a way that it pushes the ddakji of their opponents out of bounds; these out of bounds ddakji are then considered 'captured' by the thrower. If a player's ddakji lands in bounds and does not come out, they cannot pick up that ddakji and must use ones that they previously captured. If they have none remaining, they lose. The objectives are to capture as many of the other players' ddakji as possible before one's own ddakji are captured and before they are eliminated due to having no ddakji on hand.
- Bureomeokgi (불어먹기; lit. 'blowing') involves attempting to displace ddakji using displaced air, typically by blowing wind out of one's mouth.

== History ==
The game is attested to some time during the 1392–1897 Joseon period. Paper was scarce during that period, so ddakji were made from whatever paper-like materials were available. During the 1910 to 1945, Japanese colonial period, ddakji was played. Some depicted Japanese soldiers. After the liberation of Korea, paper became increasingly available to the general public, and the practice of folding ddakji became solidified. North Korean leader Kim Jong Il was reportedly a fan of the game, and encouraged its playing in the North.

== In popular culture ==
The game has achieved some degree of international awareness and popularity. The game is featured in the first episode of the Netflix television series Squid Game (it is also seen in the second season's six-legged pentathlon as the first stage of the game and at the end of the final episode of season 3). Due to the popularity of the show, ddakji and other traditional Korean games featured in it were played around the world. Some casinos have also started offering ddakji games.

Korean Cultural Centers, which are international institutions for spreading awareness of Korean culture, have shared the game internationally.

The South Korean variety show Running Man occasionally features ddakji in its missions.

== See also ==
- Milk caps – similar Western game
- Menko – similar Japanese game
- Ttakchibon – a short book format popular in the early 20th century, named for ddakji
