= Ttakchibon =

Book format in colonial Korea

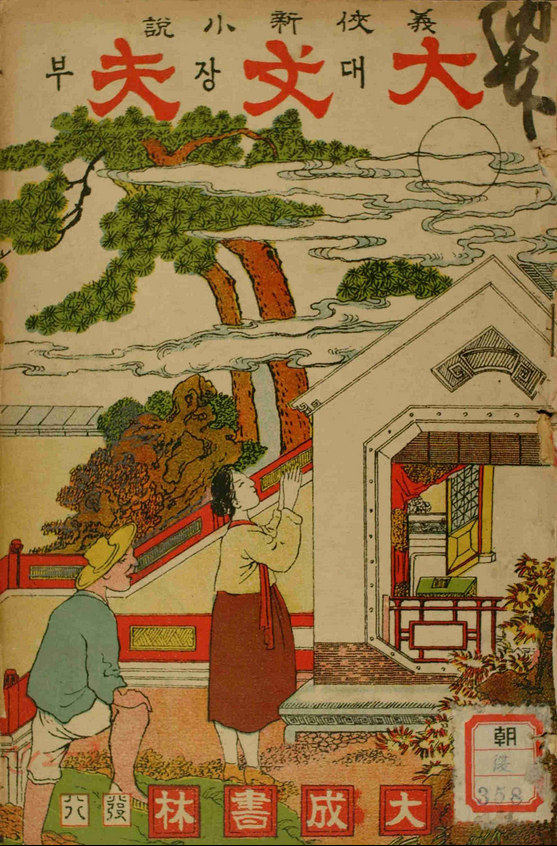
An example of a ttakchibon novel cover

Ttakchibon (Korean: 딱지본), which literally means "ddakji novel," was a popular type of book format during the early 1910s, when Korea was under Japanese imperial rule.

The name "ttakchibon" comes from the name of the scraps of paper used to play a traditional Korean version of milkcaps, which were called ddakji. Ttakchibon covers were quite colorful, just as ddakji were, hence the name. Ttakchibon were also sometimes called kyŏngpan (경판; 京板).

Around this time, esoteric books were becoming less popular, while books meant for leisurely reading were becoming more common. Thus, many novels meant for light reading were published in this format during this time.

Ttakchibon were popular due to their cheap cost and portable size; they often cost no more than 6 Korean won, and were made to be quite thin. Due to this, this format's popularity became widespread throughout the country.

Among the most famous books published in this format is "The Record of Lady Sa's Trip to the South" by Kim Man-jung.
