= Imjin nok =

Korean literature

Imjin nok (壬辰錄 Record of the Imjin War) is a historical war story that takes place during the Japanese invasion of Korea in 1592. The story begins with the dream of Emperor Seonjo of Joseon, which foresees Japan’s invasion, proceeds to trace Admiral Yi Sun-shin’s activities as he successfully blocks Japan’s attacks, and concludes with Sa Myeongdang going to Japan and receiving an official document of surrender. While technically based on a true historical event, Imjin nok includes a considerable number of fictionalized elements and is ultimately a work created to inspire national pride among the Korean people with regard to Japan.

== Authorship ==
The author is unknown. The text is estimated to have been written sometime after the 17th century.

== Plot ==
Emperor Seonjo has a dream in which a young girl brings a bag of grains to the royal palace. As soon as she sets it down, a huge fire erupts. Upon waking from his dream, Seonjo calls his vassals and asks them to interpret it for him. His second vice-premier, Choe Ilyeong, states that it is an omen of Japan’s impending invasion. Emperor Seonjo becomes angry, accusing him of stirring up unnecessary trouble during a time of peace, and banishes him.

Three years later, in the summer of the Imjin Year, Japan mobilizes hundreds of thousands of men for its army and attacks Joseon. Admiral Yi Sun-shin, already aware of the disaster brewing, orders the construction of the so-called “Turtle Ships” and courageously fights, eventually dying in battle. The Japanese army approaches the Korean capital and Seonjo is forced to escape to Uiju. The Japanese army eventually manages to seize the territory extending from Hanyang (the former name for the capital of Korea) to Pyongyang. Choe Ilyeong returns from his place of exile and finds Emperor Seonjo, recommending that he appoint General Kim Ung-seo from Pyeongyan Province. Moreover, Kim Tŏngnyŏng from Koksan appears and performs Taoist magic on Katō Kiyomasa, a commander of the enemy forces, in order to retaliate and punish him.

In the meantime, Yu Sŏngnyong is sent to Ming China as an envoy to ask for help, but the Ming government refuses to provide any additional backup forces with the excuse that it is currently farming season. Yu Sŏngnyong is forced to return to Korea, but Guan Yu (courtesy name: Guan Yunzhang) appears in the Emperor of Ming China’s dream. In his dream, the Chinese emperor is Liu Bei, and Zhang Fei, his sworn brother from the past, has become the King of Joseon. With this, the emperor calls over his general, Li Rusong, and states that he will pledge his help to Joseon. Li Rusong finds numerous faults with the emperor’s decision and continuously delays the army’s planned march to Joseon, but thanks to Yu Sŏngnyong's use of Taoist magic and clever manipulation of the circumstances, they eventually make it to Joseon. Finally, Li Rusong of Ming China and Katō Kiyomasa of Japan find themselves battling against each other, and with the help of Guan Yu, Li Rusong manages to defeat Katō Kiyomasa. The Japanese forces thereby suffer a crushing defeat and retreat back to their land.

Kim Tŏngnyŏng makes numerous contributions to the battle as the commander of the righteous armies, but a traitor named Kim Sundal eventually frames him for a crime. The royal court demands Kim Tŏngnyŏng's capture and execution. Although they attempt to behead him, their knife continuously breaks; whenever they try to shoot him with an arrow, the arrow snaps in half, and they are unable to kill him. Kim Tŏngnyŏng states that if they erect a tombstone that states, “Faithful Son, Kim Tŏngnyŏng,” he will voluntarily die and faces death courageously.

Li Rusong, having defeated the Japanese army, travels the entirety of the eight provinces that compose the Korean peninsula and uses geomancy to divine the land, severing the connections of the mountains and streams. He does so because he senses that many magnificent heroes will come from Korea and he is filled with envy. Yet in the midst of his actions, a mountain deity disguised as an old man appears before him and scares him off, resulting in Li’s retreat to China.

Afterwards, the royal court sends Kim Ung-seo and Kang Hongrip, two generals, to Japan to receive a formal letter of surrender, but Kang Hongrip fails in this mission. Kang Hongrip is seduced by the enemy to join their side and becomes the son-in-law of the Japanese Emperor, while Kim Ung-seo refuses until the very end to capitulate to the enemy and proceeds to kill Kang and then commit suicide.

Hyujeong (also known as Seosan daesa) then goes to greet King Seonjo, and his follower, Sa Myeong-dang, is sent to Japan where he succeeds in establishing peaceful relations between the two countries. The Japanese Emperor, hearing rumors that Sa Myeong-dang is the reincarnation of Buddha, tries all methods to assassinate him but he fails and is forced to write an official surrender. Sa Myeong-dang thus forms a treaty in which Japan presents tributaries to Korea and safely returns to his homeland.

== Features and significance ==
Imjin nok consists of numerous episodes and characters that were involved in the Japanese invasion of Korea in 1592, but there are considerable deviations from the factual historical record, such as Yi Sun-shin fighting in the early throes of the war and Kang Hongrip becoming the son-in-law of the Japanese Emperor.

Though there are many existing copies of this story, there are also large differences between each version. Versions of Imjin nok can generally be classified as the “historical” version, the “Choe Ilyeong” version, and the “Guan Yu” version, but there are also versions that do not belong to any of the aforementioned categories. The “historical” version is based on historical records and only partially includes fictional or fable-like elements. The “Choe Ilyeong” version is written with the fictitious character, Choe Ilyeong, as the main protagonist, and the “Guan Yu” version is based on an oral folktale and is the most fictional of all three versions.

== Other ==
The South Korean game production company, Dreamware, made the real-time strategy games, “Imjin nok” and Imjin nok 2: Joseon’s Counterattack.”

== Archival materials ==
There are two separate versions of this text, including one written in Korean and one written in classical Chinese. Including both versions, there are approximately 50 extant versions of this text.

== Sources ==
See the entry for Imjin nok in the Naver Encyclopedia of Korean Culture: here
