= Wilt L. Idema =

Dutch scholar and Sinologist (born 1944)

- Born: 12 November 1944 (age 80); Dalen, Drenthe, Netherlands
- Education: Leiden University
- Scientific career
- Fields: Medieval Chinese literature
- Institutions: Harvard University; Leiden University
- Doctoral advisor: A.F.P. Hulsewé

Chinese name
- Traditional Chinese: 伊維德
- Simplified Chinese: 伊维德
Transcriptions
Standard Mandarin
- Hanyu Pinyin: Yī Wéidé
- Wade–Giles: I^{1} Wei^{2}-te^{2}

Wilt Lukas Idema (born 12 November 1944) is a Dutch scholar and Sinologist who taught at University of Leiden and Harvard University (2000–13), presently emeritus at both universities. He specializes in Chinese literature, with interests in early Chinese drama, Chinese women's literature of the premodern period, Chinese popular narrative ballads, and early development of Chinese vernacular fiction.

He and his wife have two children.

== Academic career ==
Idema took his undergraduate degree from Leiden University, Department of Chinese Languages & Cultures in 1968. He then studied in the Department of Sociology, Hokudai University, Sapporo, Japan in 1968- 1969 and the Institute for Research in Humanities at Kyoto University. April 1, 1969 –March 31, 1970; Universities Service Center, Hong Kong. Summer 1970. He took his doctoral degree at Leiden University 30 October 1974, where his thesis, Chinese Vernacular Fiction, the Formative Period, was completed under the direction of A.F.P. Hulsewé.

Idema then taught at his alma mater in the Department of Chinese Language and Culture. He was promoted to Professor of Chinese Literature and Linguistics in 1976. At Leiden at various times he was Chairman of the Department of Chinese Languages & Culture; Vice-dean for Educational Matters, School of Humanities; Dean, School of Humanities; Director, Centre for Non-Western Studies; Dean, School of Humanities. He has been Visiting Professor at University of Hawaii at Manoa, University of California at Berkeley, and École Pratique des Hautes Études, Paris. Since 2000, he has been Professor of Chinese Literature at Harvard University. Among his professional positions are Co-editor T'oung Pao, 1993-1999; Editor Sinica Leidensia, 1997-2006; Editor Harvard Journal of Asiatic Studies, 2000-2003.

In 2009, colleagues published a volume of studies in his honor, Text, Performance, and Gender in Chinese Literature and Music Essays in Honor of Wilt Idema. The Introduction says that Idema "masterfully integrates translation with cultural-historical contextualization, in what over the years has become a uniquely recognizable style." They commented that his body of work "is exceptional in its inclusiveness and its ability to let different historical periods, genres and issues speak to one another." The bibliography "is something of an explosion of language" and "its fairly shocking physical length is only one indicator of what Wilt's work means to our field, for this is not just a function of the encyclopedic scope of his knowledge, or his sheer productivity, or even of the quality and the ambition of his work." In a review of the field of Chinese literature, Robert E. Hegel declared "Wilt L. Idema's studies in Chinese Vernacular Fiction: The Formative Period are definitive statements on vernacular literature in general, on the short story, and on the long pinghua. His most frequent co-author has been Stephen H. West.

Idema was the 1992 Winner of the Martinus Nijhoff Vertaalprijs (Dutch National Translation Award). Idema was elected a member of the Royal Netherlands Academy of Arts and Sciences in 1999.

In 2015, Idema was one of twenty Sinologists to win the 9th Special Book Award of China, a national-level award set up by General Administration of Press and Publication (GAPP).

== Publications ==
Partial listing:

- "China's Educational Revolution", in: John Gardner (ed.), Authority, Participation and Cultural Change in China, Cambridge University Press, 1973. pp. 257–89.
- "Storytelling and the Short Story in China", T'oung Pao LIX, 1973, pp. 1-67.
- "Chinese Vernacular Fiction, the Formative Period", Sinica Leidensia, XIII, Leiden: E.J.Brill, 1974. Google Books
- "Some Remarks and Speculations Concerning P'ing-Hua", in: T'oung Pao, LX, 1974, pp. 121-72.
- Feng Meng-Long, De Drie Woorden, Vijf Chinese Novellen, (translation and introduction by W.L. Idema(, Oosterse Bibliotheek, Deel 2, Amsterdam: Meulenhoff, 1976. ISBN
- "Stage and Court in China: The Case of Hung-Wu's Imperial Theatre", Oriens Extremus, XXIII, 1976, pp. 175-190.
- Verzinsels zijn geen letterkunde. Het literatuurbegrip in het traditionele China. Oratie, Leiden: E. J. Brill, 1976. ISBN
- "Diseases and Doctors, Drugs and Cures. A Very Preliminary List of Passages of Medical Interest in a Number of Traditional Chinese Novels and Related Plays", Chinese Science, II, 1977, pp. 37-63.
- Hanshan, gedichten van de Koude Berg. Zen-Poëzie, (translation and afterword by W.L. Idema), Chinese Bibliotheek, Deel 8, Amsterdam: Arbeiderspers, 1977. ISBN
- "The Mystery of the Halved Judge Dee Novel", Tamkang Review, VIII, 1977, pp. 155-170.
- "Performance and Construction of the Chu-Kung-Tiao" in: Journal of Oriental Studies, XVI, 1978, pp. 63-78.
- Pu Songling, De Beschilderde Huid. Spookverhalen, (translation and introduction by W.L. Idema, B.J. Mansvelt Beck, N.H. Van Straten), Oosterse Bibliotheek, Deel 9, Amsterdam: Meulenhoff, 1978. ISBN
- Vinger Gods, wat zijt Gij groot. Een bloemlezing uit het werk van de domineedichters Nicolaas Beets, J.P. Hasebroek, Bernard Ter Haar, J.J.L. Ten Kate, Eliza Laurillard, (anthology and introduction by Anton Korteweg and W.L.Idema), Amsterdam: Arbeiderspers, 1978.
- W.L. Idema, Aad Nuis, D.W. Fokkema (ed.), Oosterse literatuur. Een inleiding tot de Oosterse Bibliotheek, Amsterdam: Meulenhoff, 1979. ISBN
- "Shih Chün-Pao's and Chu Yu-Tun's Ch'ü-Chiang Ch'ih. The Variety of Mode within Form", in: T'oung Pao, LXVI, 1980, pp. 217-265.
- "Zhu Youdun's Dramatic Prefaces and Traditional Fiction", in: Ming Studies , X, 1980, pp 17-21.
- "Dutch Sinology and the Study of Chinese Traditional Vernacular Fiction",in: Zhongguo gudian xiaoshuo yanjiu zhuanji, III, 1981, pp. 25-40.
- "The Wen-Ching Yüan-Yang Hui and the Chia-Men of Ming-Ch'ing Ch'uan-Ch'i", in: T'oung Pao, LXVII, 1981, pp. 91-106.
- with Stephen H. West: Chinese Theater 1100-1450. A Source Book, Münchener Ostasiatische Studien, Steiner, 1982. ISBN
- Bai Xingjian, Het Hoogste Genot, (translation, introduction andclarification by W.L. Idema), Cahiers Van De Lantaarn, No. 19, Leiden: De Lantaarn, 1983. ISBN
- De Vorsten van het Woord. Teksten over dichterschap en poëzie uit Oosterse tradities. Studies en Vertalingen, De Oosterse Bibliotheek, Deel 21, Amsterdam: Meulenhoff, 1983. ISBN
- "The Illusion of Fiction", in: CLEAR, V, 1983, pp. 47-51.
- Mijnheer Dong. Het verhaal van de Westerkamers in alle toonaarden, (translation and introduction by W.L. Idema), De Oosterse Bibliotheek, Deel 22, Amsterdam: Meulenhoff, 1984. ISBN
- "The Story of Ssu-Ma Hsiang-Ju and Cho Wen-Chün in Vernacular Literature of the Yüan and Early Ming Dynasties", in: T'oung Pao, LXX, 1984, pp. 60-109.
- "Yüan-Pen as a Minor Form of Dramatic Literature in the Fifteenth and Sixteenth Centuries", in: CLEAR, VI, 1984, pp. 53-75.
- Zingend roei ik huiswaarts op de maan. Gedichten Van Meng Haoran, Wang Wei, Li Taibai, Du Fu en Bai Juyi, uit het Chinees vertaald, Amsterdam: Arbeiderspers, 1984.
- The Dramatic Oeuvre of Chu Yu-Tun (1379-1439), Sinica Leidensia, Leiden: E.J.Brill, 1985. ISBN
- Wie zich pas heeft gebaad, tikt het stof van zijn kap. Gedichten in Fu-vorm uit de tweede eeuw v.Chr.- vijfde eeuw n.Chr., Leiden: De Lantaarn, 1985.
- with Lloyd Haft: Chinese Letterkunde. Inleiding, historisch overzicht, bibliografieën, De Meern: Spectrum, 1985. ISBN
- Bai Juyi, Gans, Papegaai en Kraanvogel. Gedichten uit het Oude China, Amsterdam: Meulenhoff, 1986.
- Bai Juyi, Lied Van Het Eeuwig Verdriet, Baarn: Arethusa Pers, 1986. ISBN
- Dichter en Hof. Verkenningen in veertien culturen, Utrecht: HES, 1986. ISBN
- (ed.) "Popular Literature. Part II: Prosimetric Literature", in The Indiana Companion to Traditional Chinese Literature, Bloomington: Indiana University Press, 1986. pp. 83–92.
- Feng Zhi. Reis naar het Noorden, een gedicht, Amsterdam: Meulenhoff, 1987.
- "Poet Versus Minister and Monk: Su Shi on Stage in the Period 1250-1450", in: T'oung Pao, LXXIII, 1987, pp. 190-216.
- "The Orphan of Zhao: Self-Sacrifice, Tragic Choice and Revenge, and the Confucianization of Mongol Drama at the Ming Court", in Cina, XXI, 1988, 159-190.
- Du Fu, De Verweesde Boot, (translation and clarification by W.L. Idema), Amsterdam: Meulenhoff, 1989.
- "Area Studies in the Nineties: Prima Donna of Member of the Chorus?", in: E. Zürcher and T. Langendorff, (ed.), The Humanities in the Nineties, a View from the Netherlands, Amsterdam: Swets and Zeitlinger, 199, pp. 337–353.
- "Cannon, Clocks and Clever Monkeys: Europeana, Europeans and Europe in Some Early Ch'ing Novels", in: (ed.), Development and Decline of Fukien Province in the 17th and 18th Centuries, Sinica Leidensia, XXII, Leiden: E.J.Brill, 1990, pp. 459–488.
- "Emulation through Readaption in Yüan and Early Ming", in Asia Major, III, 1990, pp. 113-128.
- 'The Founding of the Han Dynasty in Early Drama: The Autocratic Suppression of Popular Debunking", in E. Zürcher, (ed.), Thought and Law in Qin and Han China, Sinica Leidensia, XXIII, Leiden: E.J.Brill, 1990). pp. 183–207.
- Liederen Van Li Qingzhao, Amsterdam: Meulenhoff, 1990.
- (ed.) Thought and Law in Qin and Han China, Studies Dedicated to Anthony Hulsewé on the Occasion of His Eightieth Birthday, Sinica Leidensia XXIII, Leiden: E.J.Brill, 1990.
- "Zhu Youdun's Plays as a Guide to Fifteenth Century Performance Practice", in CHINOPERL Papers 15, 1990, pp. 17-25.
- The Moon and the Zither: The Story of the Western Wing, ( edited and translated by Idema, with an Introduction by Stephen H. West and Wilt L. Idema; with a Study of Its Woodblock Illustrations by Yao Dajuin), Berkeley: University of California Press, 1991. ISBN 0520068076.
- Spiegel van de klassieke Chinese poëzie. Van het Boek der Oden tot de Qing-dynastie, Amsterdam: Meulenhoff, 1991; 6th ed. 2000 - (an anthology of classical Chinese poetry)
- "Data on the Chu-Kung-Tiao, a Reassessment of Conflicting Opinions", in T'oung Pao, LXXIX, 1993, pp. 69-112.
- De Man met de kroezende baard: Chinese verhalen uit de Tang-Dynastie, Amsterdam: Meulenhoff, 1993.
- "Dierenverhaal en dierenfabel in de traditionele Chinese letterkunde", in: (ed.), Mijn naam is Haas, Baarn: Ambo, 1993, pp. 222–237.
- "The Ideological Manipulation of Traditional Drama in Ming Times: Some Comments on the Work of Tanaka Issei", in: H. Chun-Chieh and Z. Erik, (ed.), Norms and the State in China, Leiden: E. J. Brill, 1993, pp. 50–70.
- "Mao Dun and Speenhoff, or How a Fallen Woman from Rotterdam Started a New Life in Shanghai", in: H. Lloyd (ed.), Words from the West, Western Texts in Chinese Literary Contexts. Essays to Honor Erik Zürcher on His Sixty Fifth Birthday, Leiden: CNWS, 1993, pp. 35–47.
- Mijn naam is Haas. Dierenverhalen in verschillende culturen, Baarn: Ambo, 1993.
- "Skulls and Skeletons in Art and on Stage", in: Blusse, Leonard and Zurndorfer, Harriet, (ed.), Conflict and Accommodation in Early Modern Asia. Essays in Honour of Erik Zürcher, Leiden: E. J. Brill, 1993), pp. 191–215.
- "Traditional Theatre in Modern Times: The Chinese Case", in: C. C. Barfoot and B. Cobi, (ed.), Theatre Intercontinental, Forms, Functions, Correspondences, Amsterdam: Rodopi, 1993, pp. 11–24.
- De in alle toonaarden begeerde draken van Liu Zhiyuan, Leiden: CNWS, 1994.
- De burger schuddebuikt: Een bloemlezing uit het werk van de luimige dichters, Amsterdam: Querido, 1994.
- "Sexuality and Innocence: The Characterization of Oriole in the Hongzhi Edition of the Xixiangji", in: (ed.), Paradoxes of Traditional Chinese Literature, Hong Kong: The Chinese University of Hong Kong Press, 1994, pp. 21–59.
- with Stephen H. West: "Lan Caihe Niandai Ji Qi Shiliao Jiazhi", in Z. Tang, (ed.), Shoujie Yuanqu Guoji Yantaohui Lunwenji (a Collection of Essays for the First International Symposium on Yuanqu), Shijiazhuang: Hebei Jiaoyu Chubanshe; Albany: SUNY Press, 1994, pp. 594–598.
- with Stephen H. West: "Story of the Western Wing (Xixiangji) (Romance of the Western Chamber)", in: M. Barbara Stoler, (ed.), Masterworks of Asian Literature in Comparative Perspective: a Guide for Teaching, Armonk: M.E. Sharpe, 1994, pp. 347–360.
- "Dutch Sinology: Past, Present and Future", in: W. Ming and C. John, (ed.), Europe Studies China. Papers from an International Conference on the History Of European Sinology, London: Han-shan Tang Books, 1995, pp. 88–110.
- "Satire and Allegory in All Keys and Modes", in: H.C. Tillman and H.W. Stephen, (ed.), China under Jurchen Rule, Albany: SUNY Press, 1995, pp. 238–280.
- "Time and Space in Traditional Chinese Historical Fiction", in: H. Chun-Chieh and Z. Erik, (ed.), Time and Space in Chinese Culture, Leiden: E.J. Brill, 1995, pp. 362–379.
- Wang Shifu, the Story of the Western Wing, Berkeley: University of California Press, 1995. ISBN
- Bai Xingjian, Het hoogste genot, gevolgd door De genoegens van de liefde (Anoniem), Leiden: Plantage, 1996.
- De mooiste verhalen uit het Oude China, Amsterdam: Meulenhoff, 1996.
- De volle maan van het verleden. Klassieke Chinese gedichten, Amsterdam: Meulenhoff, 1996.
- "Language, Writing and Literature: East Asia", in: J. Herrmann and E. Zürcher, (ed.), History of Humanity. Vol. III. From the Seventh Century BC to the Seventh Century AD, Paris: UNESCO/London: Routledge, 1996, pp. 76–79.
- Vrouwenschrift: Vriendschap, huwelijk en wanhoop van Chinese vrouwen, opgetekend in een eigen schrift, Amsterdam: Meulenhoff, 1996. ISBN
- "'Why You Never Have Read a Yuan Drama: The Transformation of Zaju at the Ming Court", in: S.M. Carletti, M. Sacchetti and P. Santangelo, (ed.), Studi in onore di Lanciello Lanciotti, Napoli: Istituto Universitario Orientale, Dipartimento di Studi Asiatici, 1996), pp. 765–791.
- "Zelfbeeld en tegenbeeld, of De liefde voor het Westen in een voormalige hypokolonie", in Tijdschrift voor Literatuurwetenschap, 1-2, 1996, pp. 18-23.
- "Zwarte magie in de Rode kamer", in: (ed.), Bezweren en betoveren: Magie in literatuur wereldwijd,Baarn: Ambo, 1996, pp. 73–83.
- with Lloyd Haft Chinese letterkunde, Een inleiding, Amsterdam: Amsterdam University Press, 1996.
- "The Pilgrimage to Taishan in the Dramatic Literature of the Thirteenth and Fourteenth Centuries", in CLEAR, 19, 1997, pp. 23-57.
- "Zheng Banqiao's Tien liederen met een Taoïstische strekking", in: (ed.), Vijfhonderd opzichters van vijfhonderd bibliotheken doven de lichten. Gedichten uit China, Taiwan, Korea en Japan, Leiden: Plantage, 1997, pp. 32–43.
- with Lloyd Haft: A Guide to Chinese Literature, Michigan Monographs in Chinese Studies, Ann Arbor: Center for Chinese Studies, University of Michigan, 1997. ISBN 0892640995
- "Confucius Batavus: Het eerste Nederlandse dichtstuk naar het Chinees" , in Literatuur, 99.2, 1998, pp. 85-89.
- "Een Chinese avonturenroman: De reis naar het Westen", in: (ed.), Op avontuur! Aspecten van avonturenverhalen in Oost En West, Zutphen: Walburg Pers, 1998, pp. 44–57.
- "Female Talent and Female Virtue: Xu Wei's Nüzhuangyuan and Meng Chengshun's Zhenwenji", in: W. Hua and A. Wang, (ed.), "Ming Qing Xiqu Guoji Yantaohui Lunwenji", Taipei: Zhongyang yanjiu yuan, Zhongguo Wenzhe yanjiusuo choubeichu, 1998, pp. 549 – 71.
- "Het Chinese vrouwenschrift: Het eigen schrift en de eigen literatuur van de vrouwen Van Jiangyong (Hunan)", in: (ed.), Verslagen van het RUG-Centrum Voor Genderstudies, Gent: Academia Press, 1998, pp. 53–68.
- Meng Ch'eng-Shun, in: William H. Nienhauser, Jr., (ed.), The Indiana Companion to Traditional Chinese Literature, Bloomington: Indiana University Press, 1998, pp. 112–117.
- Op avontuur! Aspecten van avonturenverhalen in Oost en West, Zutphen: Walburg Pers, 1998.
- "Robert H. Van Gulik (1910-1967)", in: W.W. Robin, (ed.), Mystery and Suspense Writers. The Literature of Crime, Detection, and Espionage, New York: Charles Scribner's Sons, 1998, pp. 933–941.
- De Onthoofde Feministe. Leven en werk van schrijvende vrouwen in het Chinese Keizerrijk van de vroege tweede eeuw v.Chr. tot de eerste jaren van de twintigste eeuw, Amsterdam: Atlas, 1999.
- "Guanyin's Acolytes", in: A.M.D.M. Jan and M.E. Peter, (ed.), Linked Faiths. Essays on Chinese Religions and Traditional Culture in Honour of Kristofer Schipper, Leiden: E.J. Brill, 1999, pp. 205–226.
- "Guanyin's Parrot: a Chinese Animal Tale and Its International Context", in: C. Alfredo, (ed.), India, Tibet, China, Genesis and Aspects of Traditional Narrative, Orientalia Venetiana, VII, Firenze: Leo S. Olschki Editore, 1999, pp. 103–150.
- "Male Fantasies and Female Realities: Chu Shu-Chen and Chang Yü-Niang and Their Biographers", in: Zurndorfer, (ed.), Chinese Women in the Imperial Past. New Perspectives, Leiden: E.J. Brill, 1999, pp. 19–52.
- "Performances on a Three-Tiered Stage: Court Theatre During the Qianlong Era", in: B. Lutz and S. Erling von Mende und Martina, (ed.), Ad Seres et Tungusos, Festschrift für Matin Gimm, Opera Sinologica 11, Wiesbaden: Otto Harrassowitz, 2000, pp. 201–219.
- Prinses Miaoshan, en andere Chinese legenden van Guanyin, de Bodhisattva van Bermhartigheid, Amsterdam: Atlas, 2000. ISBN
- with Lloyd Haft: Letterature Cinese, Venezia: Cafoscerina, 2000. ISBN
- Bai Juyi, Gedichten en proza, Amsterdam: Atlas, 2001. ISBN
- "The Life and Legend of Cui Hao", in: N. Christina, R. Heiner and S. Ines-Susanne, (ed.), China in seinen Biographischen Dimensionen. Gedenkschrift für Helmut Martin, Wiesbaden: Harrassowitz Verlag, 2001, pp. 65–74.
- "Proud Girls", in: Nan Nü, Men, Women and Gender in Early and Imperial China , 3:2, 2001, pp. 232-48.
- "Traditional Dramatic Literature", in M. Victor, (ed.), The Columbia History of Chinese Literature, New York: Columbia University Press, 2001. pp. 785–847; 1126-1131.
- "The Filial Parrot in Qing Dynasty Dress: A Short Discussion of the Yingge Baojuan [Precious Scroll of the Parrot]", in: Journal of Chinese Religions, 30, 2002, pp. 77-96.
- "Lü T'ien-Ch'eng and the Lifestyle of the Chiang-Nan Elite in the Final Decades of the Wan-Li Period", in: Studies in Central and East-Asian Religions, 12/13, 2002, pp. 1-40.
- "Dutch Translations of Classical Chinese Literature: Against a Tradition of Retranslation", in: C. Leo Tak-chung, (ed.), One into Many: Translation and the Dissemination of Classical Chinese Literature, Amsterdam/New York: Editions Rodopi, 2003, pp. 213–242.
- "Banished to Yelang: Li Taibai Putting on a Performance", in Minsu quyi, 145, 2004, pp. 5-38.
- "Blasé Literati", in: (ed.), Lü T'ien-Ch'eng and the Lifestyle of the Chiang-Nan Elite in the Final Decades of the Wan-Li Period, Leiden: E.J. Brill, 2004. pp.
- Boeddha, hemel en hel. Boeddhistische verhalen uit Dunhuang, Amsterdam: Atlas, 2004.
- "Zang Maoxun as a Publisher", in: A. Isobe, (ed.), Higashi Ajia Shuppan Bunka Kenkyu-: Niwatazumi / Studies of Publishing Culture in East Asia “Niwatazumi”, Tokyo: Nigensha, 2004, pp. 9–29.
- with Beata Grant: The Red Brush. Writing Women of Imperial China, Cambridge MA: Harvard University Asia Center, 2004. ISBN
- "Educational Frustration, Shape-Shifting Texts, and the Abiding Power of Anthologies: Three Versions of Wang Can Ascends the Tower", in Early Medieval China, 10-11.2, 2005, pp. 145-183.
- "Emperor and General: Some Comments on the Formal and Thematic Continuities between the Vernacular Stories from Dunhuang and the Vernacular Stories from Later Dynasties", in: (ed.), The Harmony and Prosperity of Civilizations, Beijing: Beijing daxue chubanshe, 2005, pp. 114–127.
- "Li Kaixian's Revised Plays by Yuan Masters (Gaiding Yuanxian Chuanqi) and the Textual Transmission of Yuan Zaju as Seen in Two Plays by Ma Zhiyuan", in CHINOPERL Papers, 26, 2005, pp. 47-66.
- "The Many Shapes of Medieval Chinese Plays: How Texts Are Transformed to Meet the Needs of Actors, Spectators, Censors, and Readers", in Oral Tradition, 20/2, 2005, pp. 320 334.
- "”What Eyes May Light Upon My Sleeping Form?”: Tang Xianzu's Transformation of His Sources, with a Translation of “Du Liniang Craves Sex and Returns to Life”", in Asia Major Third Series, 16, 2005, pp. 111-145.
- "”Crossing the Sea in a Leaking Boat”: Three Plays by Ding Yaokang", in (ed.), Trauma and Transcendence, Cambridge MA: Harvard University Press, 2006, pp. 387-426.
- "Drama after the Conquest", in: (ed.), Trauma and Transcendence, Cambridge MA: Harvard University Press, 2006, pp. 375-385.
- "“Suiqing Shui Jian: Du Liniang, Meigui Gongzhu Yu Ni'a Fuqin De Fannao” in Tang Xianzu Yu Mudanting", in: W. Hua, (ed.), Zhongguo Wenzhe Zhuankan, Taipei: Zhongyang yanjiu yuan, Zhongguo wenzhe yanjiusuo, 2006, pp. 289-312.
- Trauma and Transcendence in Early Qing Literature, Cambridge MA: Harvard University Asia Center, 2006. ISBN
- "Fighting in Korea: Two Early Narratives of the Story of Xue Rengui", in: E.B. Remco, (ed.), Korea in the Middle: Korean Studies and Area Studies, Leiden: CNWS, 2007, pp. 341 58.
- "Madness on the Yuan Stage", in Vergleichende Studien zur Japanische Kultur/Comparative Studies in Japanese Culture, 14, 2007, pp. 65-85.
- "Ding Yaokang, “Southern Window Dream”", in Renditions, 69, 2008, pp. 20-33.
- Personal Salvation and Filial Piety. Two Precious Scroll Narrativers of Guanyin and Her Acolytes, Honolulu: University of Hawaii Press, 2008. ISBN
- "Revisiting Meng Jiangnü", in (ed.), Diliujie Guoji Qingnian Xuezhe Hanxue Huiyi Lanwenji: Minjian Wenxue Yu Hanxue Yanjiu, Taipei: Wanjuanlou, 2008, pp. 1-26.
- Meng Jiangnü Brings Down the Great Wall: Ten Versions of a Chinese Legend, Seattle: University of Washington Press, 2008. ISBN 9780295987835.
- "Erik Zürcher, Levensbericht", in (ed.), Levensberichten en Herdenkingen, 2009, Amsterdam: KNAW, 2009, pp. 101-108.
- Filial Piety and Its Divine Rewards: The Legend of Dong Yong and Weaving Maiden, with Related Texts, Indianapolis/Cambridge: Hackett, 2009. ISBN
- Heroines of Jiangyong: Chinese Narrative Ballads in Women's Script, Washington: University of Washington Press, 2009. ISBN
- "Meiguo Hafo Daxue Hafo Yanjing Tushuguan Cang Ming Qing Funü Zhushu Huikan. 5 Vo.", in W. Yi and X. Fang, (ed.), Guilin: Guangxi shifan daxue chubanshe, 2009, pp. 48+8+8 and 504+516+540+598+464.
- Personal Salvation and Filial Piety. Two Precious Scroll Narrativers of Guanyin and Her Acolytes, Delhi: Munshiram Manoharlal Publishers, 2009. ISBN
- The White Snake and Her Son: A Translation of the Precious Scroll of Thunder Peak, with Related Texts, Indianapolis/Cambridge: Hackett, 2009. ISBN
- Zhu Youdun De Zaju, Beijing: Peking University Press, 2009. ISBN
- with Yi Weide: "Ying Mei Xuejie Dui Lidai Zhongguo Nüxing Zuojia De Yanjiu", in W. Yi and X. Fang, (ed.), Meiguo Hafo Daxue Hafo Yanjing Tushuguan Cang Ming Qing Funü Zhushu Huikan. Vol. 1, Guilin: Guangxi shifan daxue chubanshe, 2009. pp. 20 - 48.
- Heroines of Jiangyong: Chinese Narrative Ballads in Women's Script, Seattle: University of Washington Press, 2009. ISBN 9780295988429.
- "“Bei-Mei Di Ming Qing Wenxue” (the Study of Ming and Qing Literature in North America), in Zhang Haihui", in (ed.), Bei Mei Zhongguoxue: Yanjiu Gaishu Yu Wenxian Ziyuan (Chinese Studies in North America: Research and Resources), Beijing: Zhonghua shuju, 2010). pp. 636–652.
- The Butterfly Lovers — The Legend of Liang Shanbo and Zhu Yingtai: Four Versions, with Related Texts, Indianapolis/Cambridge: Hackett, 2010.
- "Dunhuang Narratives", in Kang-i Sun Chang and Stephen Owen, eds, The Cambridge History of Chinese Literature, Vol. I: To 1375, Cambridge University Press, 2010, pp. 373–380.
- "Four Miao Ballads from Hainan", in: CHINOPERL Papers, 29, 2010, pp. 143-182.
- "Het mysterie van de gehalveerde rechter Tie Roman", in: Boekerij De Graspeel, 2010, pp. 205-216.
- Wilt L. Idema (2010). Judge Bao and the Rule of Law: Eight Ballad-Stories from the Period 1250–1450. World Scientific. doi:10.1142/7327. ISBN 978-981-4277-01-3.
- "Poetry, Gender and Ethnicity: Manchu and Mongol Women Poets in Beijing (1775-1875)", in: Grace Fong, (ed.), Hsiang Lectures on Chinese Poetry. Vol. 5., Montreal: Centre for East Asian Research McGill University, 2010, pp. 1–28.
- "Prosimetric and Verse Narrative", in: Kang-i Sun Chang and Stephen Owen, (eds), The Cambridge History of Chinese Literature. Vol. II from 1375, Cambridge University Press, 2010, pp. 343–412.
- "Shi Hui, “Notes About Directing Married to a Heavenly Immortal”", in The Opera Quarterly, 26.2-3, 2010, pp. 435-445.
- with Shiamin Kwa: Mulan: Five Versions of a Classic Chinese Legend, with Related Texts, Indianapolis/Cambridge: Hackett, 2010. ISBN
- with Stephen H. West: Monks, Bandits, Lovers, and Immortals: Eleven Early Chinese Plays, Indianapolis/Cambridge: Hackett, 2010. ISBN
- "The Biographical and the Autibiographical in Bo Shaojun's One Hundred Poems Lamenting My Husband", in: J. Joan and Y. Hu, (ed.), Beyond Exemplary Tales: Women's Biography in Chinese History, Berkeley: University of California Press, 2011, pp. 230–245.
- "Bo Shaojun Baishou Kufushi Zhongdi Zizhuanxing Yu Zhuanji Xingzhi", in: J. You, Y. Hu and J. Ji, (ed.), Chongdu Zhongguo Nüxing Shengming Gushi, Taipei: Wunan, 2011, pp. 317–342.
- "An Eighteenth-Century Version of 'Liang Shanbo and Zhu Yingtai' from Suzhou", in Mair, Victor (ed.), The Columbia Anthology of Chinese Folk and Popular Literature, New York: Columbia University Press, 2011, pp. 503–551.
- "The Precious Scroll of Chenxiang", in: Victor Mair, (ed.), The Columbia Anthology of Chinese Folk and Popular Literature, New York: Columbia University Press, 2011, pp. 380–405.
- with Beata Grant: Escape from Blood Pond Hell: The Tales of Mulian and Woman Huang, Seattle: University of Washington Press, 2011.
- "Shanxi Theater in the Period 1000-1300", in: J. Shi and C. Willow Weilan Hai, (ed.), Theater, Life, and the Afterlife: Tomb Décor of the Jin Dynasty from Shanxi, Shanxi Provincial Museum/New York: China Institute Gallery, 2012, pp. 38–45.
- Wilt L. Idema and Stephen H West (2013). The Generals of the Yang Family: Four Early Plays. World Scientific. doi:10.1142/8817. ISBN 978-981-4508-68-1.
- The Immortal Maiden Equal to Heaven and Other Precious Scrolls from Western Gansu, Amherst, New York: Cambria Press,2015.
- Mouse vs. Cat in Chinese Literature: Tales and Commentary, (translated and introduced by Wilt L. Idema; foreword by Haiyan Lee), Seattle: University of Washington Press, 2019.
- ______; Olof, Allard M. The Legend of Prince Golden Calf in China and Korea. Cambria Press, 2021. ISBN 9781621967019.
