= Huaben =

Style of Chinese fiction

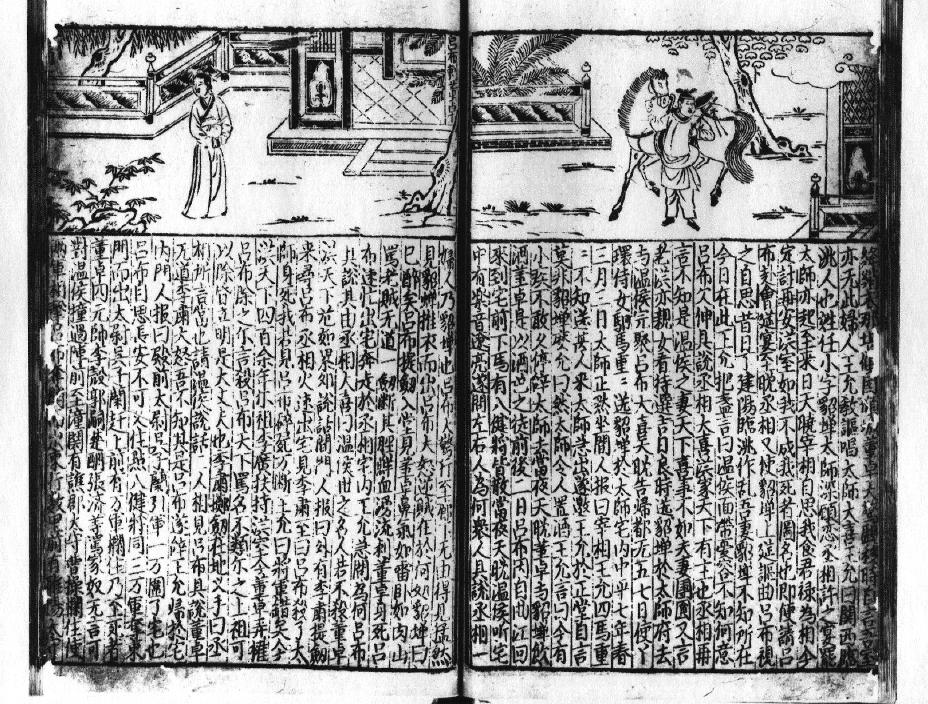
Sanguozhi Pinghua, published between 1321 and 1323

A huaben (Chinese: 话本; pinyin: huàben) is a Chinese short- or medium-length story or extended novella written mostly in vernacular language, sometimes including simple classical language. In contrast to a full-length Chinese novel, it is generally not divided into chapters and recounts a limited number of characters or events, although some huaben fictions, such as Sanguozhi Pinghua, contain upwards of some 80,000 Chinese characters. The earliest huaben are reported in the 12th century during the Song dynasty, but the genre did not see its true artistic and creative potential until the Ming dynasty, and after the mid-17th century did not produce works of originality. In the development of Chinese fiction, the huaben are heirs of the zhiguai xiaoshuo, chuanqi, bianwen (Buddhist tales), and are the predecessors of the stories and long-length novels of the Ming.

== Origins: the storytelling of the Song ==
The pleasure districts of the two Song dynasty capitals, Kaifeng and Hangzhou, hosted a range of entertainment, including storytelling. The storytellers were specialized by theme and topic. Some told historical tales, often drawn from the history of the Three Kingdoms (220–265) or the Five Dynasties (907–960), in several sessions, sometimes over several weeks. Others specialized in Buddhist stories, heirs of the bianwen. There was also a class of storytellers whose tales took one sitting. These stories were divided into subgenres, such as the stories of bandits, fantastic stories of ghosts and demons, love stories, and such. Scholars of the genre have disproved the early theory that huaben originated in the promptbooks or "cribs" used by these storytellers, but huaben did grow from the oral style and story-telling conventions of these early tales.

No original printed versions survive from the Song dynasty, and there were only few references of Song huaben recorded, though later collections print what claim to be Song huaben. The Tales of the Serene Mountain (Chinese: 清平山堂話本; pinyin: Qīngpíng Shāntáng huàběn), published in 1550 by Hong Pian, a bibliophile in Hangzhou, is the oldest known printed collection of Song huaben. It originally contained 60 huaben texts from the Song and Yuan dynasties, but fewer than half have survived, almost all considered of low quality. They are, however, the earliest evidence of written versions of these oral stories. In form, a poem often served as prologue, another at the end gave the moral of the story, and the body of the tale included passages in verse.

Another of these collections is the Datang Sanzang fashi qujing ji (Chinese: 大唐三藏取經詩話; lit. 'Stories of Master Tripitaka, of the Great Tang, who went to fetch the sutras').

Many of these Song and Yuan huaben are known as pingshu or pinghua (Chinese: 評話 or 平話; lit. 'plain tales'), such as Sanguozhi Pinghua (三國志平話 or 三國誌評話). Some antecedents are found in the texts found at Dunhuang, and clearly relied on the conventions of oral literature.

Various early 14th-century printed Huaben books from the Yuan dynasty
Qian Hanshu xuji (前漢書續集)

Le Yi tuqi qiguo chunqiu houji (樂毅圖齊七國春秋後集)

Qin bing liu guo pinghua (秦併六國平話)

Wu wang fa zhou shu (武王伐紂書)

== The late Ming huaben as literary art: the "Three Words" and "Two Hits" ==
The huaben saw the height of its innovation in the late Ming reign of the Wanli Emperor (r. 1572–1620). By the early 1600s, prosperity had increased the number of schools and commercial publishing houses, also increasing competition to pass the examinations. Many educated men could not obtain official positions and so turned instead to writing for the market. Feng Menglong (1574–1646) and Ling Mengchu (1580–1644) found themselves in just this position. As educated scholars with considerable literary talents but no means of support, they collected and edited earlier stories and wrote new ones which appealed to the new public. Although they used the storytellers' oral conventions of the earlier huaben, their new stories were sophisticated and self-conscious works of art to which these authors proudly signed their names, rather than publishing anonymously, as did the novelists.

Feng Menglong established the huaben as a commercially successful genre by publishing three sets of stories. The first, Gujin Xiaoshuo (Stories Old and New), published in 1620, became known as Illustrious Words to Instruct the World (Yushi Mingyan). It was followed by Stories to Caution the World (Jingshi Tongyan) in 1624 and Stories to Awaken the World (Xingshi Hengyan) in 1627. Because the character "yan" 言 (word) appears at the end of each title, these three collections are often referred to as "Sanyan" 三言 (Three Words).

Huaben have a wider range of subjects than the literary stories, and deal with city life and common people. The moralizing intention of these scholar-authors mingles with entertainment within multiple genres, such as love stories and detective stories. As Shuhu Yang, the recent translator of the first two volumes, comments, the "Three Words" collections provide a "vivid panoramic view of the bustling world of imperial China before the end of the Ming; we see not only scholars, emperors, ministers and generals, but a gallery of men and women in their everyday surroundings – merchants and artisans, prostitutes and courtesans, matchmakers and fortune tellers, monks and nuns, servants and maids, likes and dislikes, their views of life and death, and even their visions of the netherworld and the supernatural".

The commercial success of Feng's collections inspired Ling Mengchu to release two volumes of forty stories each in 1628 and 1633. The set is called Pai'an Jingqi, or Slapping the Table in Amazement. Compared to Feng, Ling is rooted in classical Chinese literature, rewriting stories in the vernacular.

Around 1640, an anthology, Jingu Qiguan (Curious Shows New and Old), comprising some forty stories extracted without acknowledgment from Ling and Feng's works, was so successful that the names of these two authors were eclipsed until they were rediscovered in the 20th century by scholars such as Lu Xun. In any case, the creativity of the huaben did not survive the turmoil of the fall of the Ming.

In 1915, Miao Quansun purportedly discovered in a relative's dowry an anthology titled Jingben Tongsu Xiaoshuo (Chinese: 京本通俗小說), which contained nine huaben stories The nine stories are slightly different versions of the same stories found in Feng Menglong's anthologies Stories to Caution the World (1624) and Stories to Awaken the World (1627). Hu Shih, Lu Xun, and Jaroslav Průšek among others believed in the Song origins of these stories; while Kōjirō Yoshikawa, Patrick Hanan and others disagreed. Zheng Zhenduo and Kikuya Nagasawa determined that at least one of them, "Jin Ruler Liang's Licentiousness" (金主亮荒淫), to be a middle- or late-Ming work. In 1965, Ma Yau-woon and Ma Tai-lai demonstrated that the entire book was forged by Miao.

== Translations ==
Translations of individual works may be found under each work's article.

- Y. W. Ma and Joseph S. M. Lau. ed., Traditional Chinese Stories: Themes and Variations. (New York: Columbia University Press, 1978). Reprinted: Boston: Cheng & Tsui, 1986. ISBN 978-0-231-04058-7. Pages xxii–xxiii discuss the huaben and list the examples of the genre included in the anthology.
