= Zong-qi Cai =

American and Chinese scholar

Zong-qi Cai is a scholar in the field of Sinology in the United States. In 1977, he was admitted to the Department of English at Sun Yat-sen University as an undergraduate. A year later, he advanced into the department’s inaugural master’s program, studying under Professor Dai Liuling and specializing in British and American literature. In 1984, he pursued graduate studies in comparative literature at the University of Massachusetts Amherst, earning his master’s degree in 1987. That same year, he entered Princeton University, where he studied classical Chinese literature under the guidance of Professor Yu-kung Kao. He completed his PhD in 1991 and subsequently carried out postdoctoral research at the Center for Chinese Studies at the University of Michigan.

Cai has taught at Stony Brook University, a campus of the State University of New York, and currently serves as the Lee Wing Tat Chair Professor of Chinese Literature at Lingnan University in Hong Kong. He is also the Director of the Advanced Institute for Global Chinese Studies at Lingnan University and Professor Emeritus of Chinese and Comparative Literature at the University of Illinois Urbana-Champaign.

Cai is the editor of the Columbia University Press series How to Read Chinese Literature. Additionally, he serves as the founding editor-in-chief of two English-language journals published by Duke University Press: Journal of Chinese Literature and Culture (JCLC), which is indexed in the Arts & Humanities Citation Index (AHCI), and Prism: Theory and Modern Chinese Literature. He is also the editor-in-chief of Lingnan Journal of Chinese Studies (嶺南學報). Cai has authored and edited a total of 17 books in English and 17 academic works in Chinese, published by leading academic presses in both the United States and China.

His research spans a wide range of fields, including classical Chinese poetry, ancient Chinese literary criticism, comparative poetics, comparative literature, comparative philosophy, and Buddhism.

== Early focus on Six Dynasties period ==
Zong-qi Cai's revised doctoral dissertation published in 1996 as The Matrix of Lyric Transformation: Poetic Modes and Self-Presentation in Early Chinese Pentasyllabic Poetry is foundational for the studies of the birth and evolution of one of the most important Chinese poetic genres. His committee at Princeton University included Chinese poetry mentor Yu-kung Kao and Andrew H. Plaks. This lyric genre emerged from the Han dynasty Music Bureau or Yuefu tradition, cultivated a distinct literati ancient style in the Nineteen Old Poems, and developed diverse modes of self-presentation in the poetry of Cao Zhi and Ruan Ji. The continuity from the earliest specimens of Chinese poetry through its subsequent developments can be experienced with unique intensity due to Cai's emphasis on close readings of the original. While the grandeur might be taken for granted in these early works, as well as selective use of folksiness, Cai traces many distinct emerging themes and emphasizes that of transience because of its centrality to subsequent Six Dynasties concerns.

Liu Xie (ca. 465 - ca. 521) enjoys paramount status among ancient Chinese literary critics in part because his major work survived, The Literary Mind and the Carving of Dragons. In 2001, Cai edited and published A Chinese Literary Mind: Culture, Creativity, and Rhetoric in Wenxin Diaolong, a thorough treatment of this masterwork. Notable contributors included Kang-i Sun Chang, Wai-yee Li, Shuen-fu Lin, Richard John Lynn, Victor H. Mair, Stephen Owen, and Andrew H. Plaks, among others. Stephen Owen explains how Liu Xie's formal exposition embodies a "discourse machine" with a logic that contends with Liu's authorial discretion. Owen's Readings in Chinese Literary Thought ISBN 0674749200 explains and translates portions of Wenxin diaolong (183-298) but A Chinese Literary Mind is noteworthy in contrast for its comprehensive treatment by multiple contributors.

Chinese Aesthetics: The Ordering of Literature, the Arts, & the Universe in the Six Dynasties, edited by Cai in 2004, includes contributions by Kang-i Sun Chang, Ronald Egan, Wai-yee Li, Shuen-fu Lin, Victor H. Mair, and others. The Six Dynasties were an important gestational period for traditional Chinese culture when the roots of many later developments first took hold, influenced both by the contending political entities of the period and by the widespread assimilation of Indian Buddhist outlooks. Essay topics include the philosophical conversations of A New Account of the Tales of the World that contributed to the emergence of aesthetic self-consciousness and also the artistic significance of Shen, the Chinese word for "spirit." During these formative years for Chinese traditional culture, activities such as literature, music, painting, calligraphy, and gardening began to take on their associations with metaphysics and higher meaning.

== Expanding contributions to Chinese literary studies and outreach ==
Cai's monograph Configurations of Comparative Poetics: Three Perspectives on Western and Chinese Literary Criticism (2002) emphasizes the need for "transcultural" studies as a step beyond cross-cultural assimilation. Juxtaposing the Chinese and Western traditions of literary criticism, Cai offers detailed comparative studies of William Wordsworth's analysis of the creative process and Liu Xie’s, between Plato and Confucius, between Ernest Fenollosa and Ezra Pound's views of the Chinese written character and the aesthetics of the dynamic force embodied in Chinese calligraphy, as well as between the philosophies of Jacques Derrida and Madhyamaka Buddhism. This bicultural or transcultural approach presages Cai's later endeavors to bring the communities of Chinese and American academics together, promoting the investigation of traditional Chinese culture by increased international sharing of perspectives.

== The How to Read Chinese Literature series ==
How to Read Chinese Poetry: A Guided Anthology (2008) was edited by Cai and features contributors including Ronald Egan, Grace S. Fong, David R. Knechtges, Xinda Lian, Shuen-fu Lin, William H. Nienhauser Jr., and Xiaofei Tian. Featuring 143 poems and addressing the full scope of the Chinese poetic tradition, this book reflects a bold, collective effort to render that tradition more accessible. For example, the Tang dynasty chapters feature close readings of poems by the famous poets Bai Juyi, Du Fu, Li Bai, and Wang Wei, and just this small group represents a mountain of high accomplishment known to most Chinese schoolkids. Every poetic period and format has its own special high points and the presentation makes clear how exploring Chinese poetry can become a never-ending journey. With the Chinese characters and pinyin transcriptions side-by-side as well as audio files available online, the format provides an integrated experience of the source material intended to increase enrichment and appreciation, deepened by the accompanying literary criticism. In 2012 the How to Read Chinese Poetry Workbook appeared, by Jie Cui and Cai, using easy-to-read layout to present 100 representative poems with extensive annotations and exercises. The workbook is organized around themes such as "Love: the Voice of Men," "Parting," and "Meditation on History: Rise and Fall of Dynasties." In 2018 How to Read Chinese Poetry in Context: Poetic Culture from Antiquity Through the Tang was published by Columbia University Press, followed by the three "How to Read Chinese Poetry" books being repackaged within the "How to Read Chinese Literature" series. Encompassing drama, prose, fiction, and literary theory, as well as poetry, these volumes provide unique access to original texts and commentary, breaking down barriers in support of innovative language and literary study. Rounding out the series, the three drama and prose titles published in 2022 were How to Read Chinese Drama: A Guided Anthology, How to Read Chinese Prose: A Guided Anthology, and How to Read Chinese Prose in Chinese: A Course in Classical Chinese.

== Journal of Chinese Literature and Culture ==
The 2014 inaugural issue of the Journal of Chinese Literature and Culture by Duke University Press initiated a successful series of collaborations by academics on both sides of the Pacific Ocean to share ideas and research. As Yuan Xingpei of Peking University and Zong-qi Cai wrote together in its foreword, "we hope to usher in a new kind of Chinese literary scholarship that will transcend traditional national and cultural boundaries. In-depth collaboration between Chinese and Western scholars is only a first step toward achieving our ideal of 'scholarly traditions around the world form one family'."

The U.S. side of JCLC editing is based at the Forum on Chinese Poetic Culture while the China-based team collaborates with national and international scholars from the hub of Peking University.

A special issue, Sound and Sense of Chinese Poetry (November 2015), edited by Cai, features a study by him of monosyllabic sound as the basis of Chinese poetic art, parsing the ways monosyllabic meanings punctuate and encourage lyrical flow in Chinese poetry's densely referential and enjoyably prosodic short lines.

== Lingnan Journal of Chinese Studies ==
In tandem with the launch of Journal of Chinese Literature and Culture in 2014, Cai presided over the relaunch of the Lingnan Journal of Chinese Studies (嶺南學報). The old LJCS (1929-1952) was a renowned venue of publication for leading 20th century Chinese scholars including Rong Geng, Wang Li, Wu Mi and others. Through a close partnership with JCLC, the new LJCS strives to build a Chinese-language platform of in-depth international collaboration for promoting cutting-edge research in traditional Chinese humanities.

== Prism: Theory and Modern Chinese Literature ==
The Forum on Chinese Poetic Culture and Lingnan University co-host Prism as 2019's new incarnation of Lingnan's Centre for Humanities Research's 1997 Journal of Modern Literature in Chinese. Through research articles, book reviews, and special issues, JMLC strives to provide a bilingual platform for broad studies including scholars from both the American and Chinese academic traditions as well as material drawn from across the broader Sinophone world.

== Forum on Chinese Poetic Culture ==
The mission of this Forum, Cai explains, "is to establish an open platform for promoting the learning and teaching of Chinese poetry and poetic culture. The Forum strives to provide a broad range of services for students, scholars, and all Chinese poetry lovers." In 2012 the Forum held its inaugural conference, "Stories of Chinese Poetic Culture: Earliest Times through the Tang," with presentations by Robert Ashmore, Jack Chen, Wai-yee Li, Stephen Owen, Maija Bell Samei, and Paula Varsano, among others. This conference presented the contributions which appear in the 2018 Columbia University Press volume How to Read Chinese Poetry in Context: Poetic Culture from Antiquity Through the Tang. Another major development for the Forum was the publication of the inaugural issue of JCLC. The Forum co-hosts JCLC with the International Academy for Chinese Studies, Peking University, and co-hosts Prism with Lingnan University.

== Bibliography ==
- Cai, Zong-qi, ed. (2022). How to Read Chinese Prose: A Guided Anthology. New York: Columbia University Press. ISBN 0-231-20365-9
- Cai, Zong-qi, Jie Cui, Liu Yucai, eds. (2022). How to Read Chinese Prose in Chinese: A Course in Classical Chinese. New York: Columbia University Press. ISBN 0-231-20293-8
- Cai, Zong-qi, co-ed. with Shengqing Wu (2019). Emotion and Visuality in Chinese Literature and Culture. Duke University Press. A special issue of Journal of Chinese Literature and Culture.
- Cai, Zong-qi, ed. (2018). How to Read Chinese Poetry in Context: Poetic Culture from Antiquity Through the Tang. New York: Columbia University Press. ISBN 0-2311-8537-5
- Cai, Zong-qi, ed. (2015). Sound and Sense of Chinese Poetry. Duke University Press. A special issue of Journal of Chinese Literature and Culture.
- Cui, Jie and Zong-qi Cai (2012). How to Read Chinese Poetry Workbook. New York: Columbia University Press. ISBN 0-231-15658-8
- Cai, Zong-qi, ed. (2008). How to Read Chinese Poetry: A Guided Anthology. New York: Columbia University Press. ISBN 0-231-13941-1
- Cai, Zong-qi, ed. (2004). Chinese Aesthetics: The Ordering of Literature, the Arts, & the Universe in the Six Dynasties. Honolulu: University of Hawai'i Press. ISBN 0-8248-2791-0
- Cai, Zong-qi (2002). Configurations of Comparative Poetics: Three Perspectives on Western and Chinese Literary Criticism. Honolulu: University of Hawai'i Press. ISBN 0-8248-2338-9
- Cai, Zong-qi, ed. (2001). A Chinese Literary Mind: Culture, Creativity, and Rhetoric in Wenxin Diaolong. Stanford, California: Stanford University Press. ISBN 0-8047-3618-9
- Cai, Zong-qi (1996). The Matrix of Lyric Transformation: Poetic Modes and Self-Presentation in Early Chinese Pentasyllabic Poetry. Ann Arbor: Center for Chinese Studies, The University of Michigan. ISBN 0-89264-111-8
- Sieber, Patricia and Regina Llamas (2022). How to Read Chinese Drama: A Guided Anthology. New York: Columbia University Press. ISBN 0-231-18649-5
- Yuan Xingpei and Zong-qi Cai. Journal of Chinese Literature and Culture. "Foreword to the Inaugural Issue" 1.1-2: iii-vi (Nov. 2014)
