= Pinghua (disambiguation) =

Pinghua refers to two Sinitic languages from Guangxi and Hunan, China.

Pinghua may also refer to:

- Pinghua (评话; 評話), art of Chinese storytelling that emerged in the Ming period, see Pingshu.
- Pinghua (評話 or 平話), Chinese oral literature from the Song, Yuan and Ming periods, see Huaben.
