= The Cambridge History of Chinese Literature =

- Author: Kang-i Sun Chang and Stephen Owen (eds.)
- Language: English
- Genre: Chinese literature
- Publisher: Cambridge University Press
- Published: 2010
- No. of books: 2

The Cambridge History of Chinese Literature is a 2-volume history book series published by Cambridge University Press in 2013. The books were edited by Kang-i Sun Chang and Stephen Owen. Volume 1 deals with Chinese literature before the Ming dynasty, and Volume 2 from the Ming dynasty onward.

Giovanni Vitello of University of Naples "L'Orientale" wrote that translation and other aspects of media circulation, class and gender issues, periodization, and the influence of geography on the creation of literature are among "the major issues for which its editors and authors appear to show a consistent and shared concern."

== Background ==
In 2004, Cambridge University Press invited Kang-i Sun Chang to be the chief editor of The Cambridge History of Chinese Literature. She declined the job at first, but later changed her mind, and invited Stephen Owen of Harvard University as co-editor. The two-volume work was published in 2010.

There were seventeen individuals in total who were involved in writing the chapters and editing the volumes. Robert E. Hegel of Washington University in St. Louis described almost all the authors as "senior scholars recognized as preeminent leaders in their respective fields." Hegel characterised the number of involved people as being relatively few and contrasted their prominence with that of The Columbia History of Chinese Literature, which had multiple writers of varying backgrounds.

== Contents ==
The volumes of the series are as follows:

1. To 1375 (edited by Stephen Owen), 2010. ISBN 978-0-521-85558-7
2. From 1375 (edited by Kang-i Sun Chang), 2010. ISBN 978-0-521-85559-4

The books delineate dynasties through their literary periods rather than political ones, and the editors argue that a greater importance should be given to literary periods rather than genres, and the editors state that the volumes does not show as much prominence for individuals nor for the classical/modern Chinese divide. Hegel stated that this was done to "avoid simple repetition of conventional generic and period divisions". According to Vitello, the volumes give prominence to ethnic and gender-related issues, and that the study of the circulation of literature and media is "another especially conspicuous feature". Hegel stated that the organisation was done to facilitating chronological reading of the book from the beginning to the end.

Essays generally range from 60 to over 100 pages, and therefore Hegel characterised most essays as being "very long". According to book reviewer William H. Nienhauser, Jr. several "potted biographies" of key people make up substantial portions of introductions of multiple chapters, even though, according to Nienhauser, the introductions of the volumes state this is not the case. Nienhauser called these portions "among the most innovative passages" and concluded that they were "an asset".

The books do not include Chinese characters, and the passages do not include summaries of plots of works discussed.

A topically ordered bibliography, a glossary with titles of works and names of people, and an index characterised by Hegel as "lengthy" are in each volume. Both bibliographies primarily include works in English and do not include works written in Chinese. Some references use Wade-Giles romanisation and therefore a reader would need to use the romanisation to find those works. According to Hegel, the index increases the ease which one can have to find terminology. Hegel characterised some references, particularly ones using Wade-Giles, as "quite old".

=== Volume I ===
The first essay, about Chinese literature in its earliest forms, is by Martin Kern. It has 115 pages, making it the longest essay of the volume. David R. Knechtges wrote "From the Eastern Han through the Western Jin (AD 25-317)", about the Han Dynasty and its course, the second chapter. The third, about Eastern Jin and the early Tang Dynasty, is by Tian Xiaofei. The fourth chapter, "The Cultural Tang", had multiple authors, with Stephen Owen being the primary author. "The Northern Song (1020-1126)" by Ronald Egan comes next. "North and South: The Twelfth and Thirteenth Centuries," the sixth, is divided into two sections, with one each written by Michael Fuller and Shen-fu Lin. "Literature from the Late Jin to the Early Ming: ca. 1230-ca. 1375" is by Stephen West.

The Tang content is organised into four stages: until 756, 756–791, "mid-Tang", "Last Flowering", and the dissolution of the dynasty.

The bibliography has a total of eight pages, something characterised by Hegel as "short".

=== Volume II ===
The first essay, "Literature of the Early Ming to Mid-Ming (1375-1572)," is written by the editor. She argues that historians had hitherto not covered this period. "The Literary Culture of the Late Ming (1573-1644)" by Tina Lu covers that period and its authors. "Early Qing to 1723" is by Lee Wai-yee; the end point is the portion when the Qing dynasty was firmly established. Shang Wei's "The Literati Era and its Demise (1723-1840)" cover's the dynasty's apex and the beginning of its decline. Wilt L. Idema wrote "Prosimetric and Verse Narrative," the fifth chapter, which chronicles the styles of literature in the later dynasties. This chapter was described by Hegel as "shorter [than others] but truly encyclopedic". David Wang wrote the sixth chapter, which was about the evolution to post-1912 Chinese literature. "Chinese Literature from 1937 to the present" by Michelle Yeh covers the last period of literature, with an end note on new media by Michael Hockx. The end chapter is "Sinophone Writings and the Chinese Diaspora" by Jing Tsu.

The Ming content is organised into four periods: until 1450, 1450–1520, 1520–1572, and 1573 onwards.

The bibliography has around 21 pages.

== Reception ==
Robert Hegel praised the "keen understanding of the historical developments". Hegel argued that "excess" detail was the "main fault" as a reader would face an information overload. He also criticised the lack of "literature", since most contributors did not supply quotations, and only of two or three lines. as well as the use of BC and AD, reflecting the Christian calendar instead of BCE and CE. He also stated that the forced reliance on glossaries due to the absence of hanzi "poorly serves the neophyte readers. He also added that institutions with relative financial affluence would be the only ones to afford the volumes due to its relatively high price. Hegel concluded that "I do strongly recommend reading all chapters here, even cover to cover."

William Nienhauser felt that "despite the price and the problems readers will encounter in consulting the work as a reference, these two volumes will remain the standard accounts of Chinese literature for decades to come, and deservedly so." He argued, however, that the indexes were "flawed" and "riddled with problems", and the lack of Chinese characters reduces the values of the volumes, which he felt were overpriced and unaffordable for students. He also stated that a general reader would find the book too lengthy despite Owen stating that the book was also intended to appeal to general readers. Nienhauser suggested that the index and glossary in each volume could have more clear principles and be combined into a single unit, and he concluded.

Vitello wrote that this "marks the most imposing history of Chinese literature that has appeared in a Western language so far". Vitello concluded that the book "is an extraordinary scholarly achievement".
