= Sanguozhi Pinghua =

Chinese novel of fourteenth century

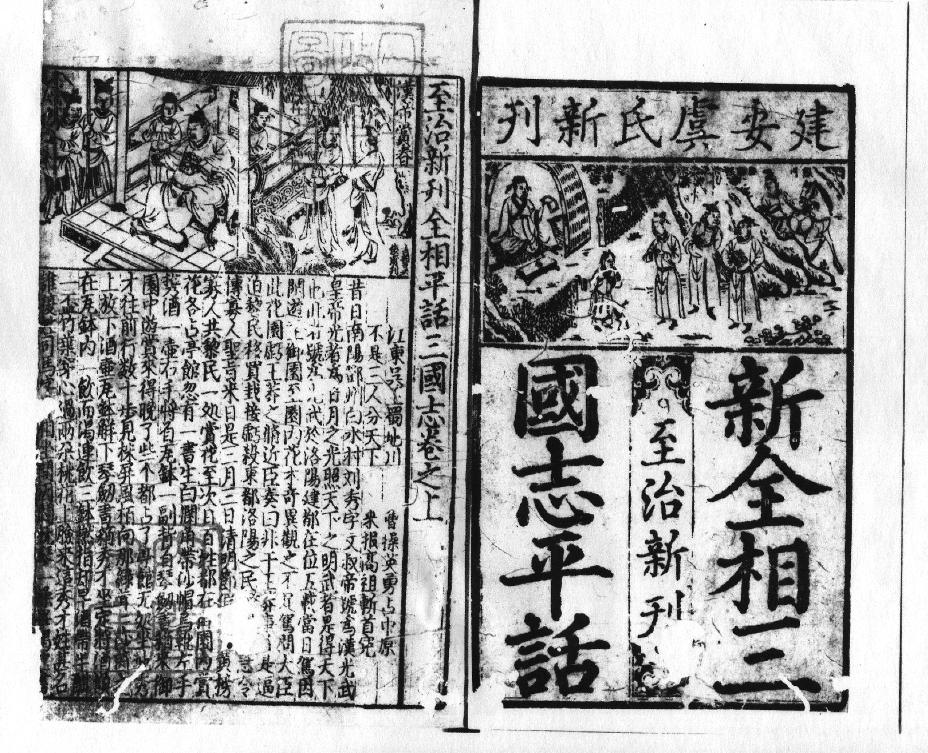
Title page of original edition

Sanguozhi Pinghua (simplified Chinese: 三国志平话; traditional Chinese: 三國志平話; pinyin: Sānguózhì Pínghuà; lit. 'Popular Tale of the Records of the Three Kingdoms'), or Records of the Three Kingdoms in Plain Language, published anonymously in the Yuan dynasty, sometime between 1321 and 1323. It contains stories of the Three Kingdoms period of Chinese history and was widely read until it was supplanted by the more detailed and forceful Romance of the Three Kingdoms.

== Background ==
The novel was translated into English for the first time in 2016 by Wilt Idema and Stephen H. West. In the Introduction, aimed at the non-specialist, they explain that there had been a group of tales and legends on the events of Three Kingdoms period, define the pinghua form, and call this novel a "fast-paced tale" that was to remain the most popular account of the legends for the next two centuries. It was printed, they explain, in a series that included other historical titles.

The scholar Yoo Min-hyung puts the novel in the tradition of oral storytellers who did not read a text aloud but added improvisations to well-known incidents, though classifying this pinghua as a novel, not a script. Yoo compares this to the Korean pansori tradition.
