= Valerie Samson =

Valerie Brooks Samson (born 16 October 1948) is an American composer, ethnomusicologist and performer with a special interest in China. She plays Chinese violin, sheng (bamboo mouth organ), and several other Chinese instruments.

Samson was born in St. Louis, Missouri. She earned a B.A. from Boston University, an M.A. from University of California, Berkeley, and a Ph.D. from University of California, Los Angeles. Her dissertation was entitled: The Modern Chamber Concerto as Genre: György Ligeti's Chamber Concerto (1969-1970) And Chamber Concerto (Original Composition). Her teachers included Andrew Imbrie, Hugo Norden, Olly Wilson, and Betty Wong.

From 1969 to 1970, Samson was a radio programmer/announcer at station WTBS in Cambridge, Massachusetts. From 1971 to 1972, she was the music director of Picchi Youth Orchestra in Oakland, California. During the 1970s, Samson began playing zhonghu (2-stringed fiddle) with Betty Wong's Flowing Spring Ensemble and with Lawrence Lui's Chinese Instrumental Music Association. She performed on the hichiriki with Suenobu Togi's Gagaku Ensemble at UCLA. In 1977, Samson became an editor at Ear Magazine, a bimonthly publication on the west coast.

In 1985, Samson was awarded the $1,000 John Lennon Award for graduate students in music. This award funded her video documentary about sheng. She studied the development of the erhu as a participant in the 1988-89 National Program for Advanced Research and Study in China.

Samson belongs to the Association for Chinese Music Research (ACMR), Chinoperl (Chinese Oral and Performing Literature), the International Alliance for Women in Music, the Society for Asian Music, and the Society for Ethnomusicology. At UCLA, she taught classes on Chinese music. She researches the changing role of traditional hugin instruments in today's performance practice. Her publications include:

== Chamber Music ==
- Blue Territory I (violin, piano)
- Duet (two oboes)
- Experimental Shorts (violin, piano)
- Mousterian Meander (recorder, cello, piano)
- Quartet (flute, clarinet, viola, cello)
- String Trio

== Orchestra ==
- Encounter
- Night Visits

== Multimedia ==
- Montage: A Journey Through Youth (three sopranos, piano, dancer, lights)

== Piano ==
- Winter Dances (prepared piano)

== Prose ==
- ACMR Reports
- “Interview with Douglas Leedy” (Ear magazine, vol. 4 no. 4, April 1976.)
- “Interview with Stuart Dempster” (The Composer 1978)
- “Music as protest strategy: The example of Tiananmen Square, 1989”, Pacific Review of Ethnomusicology 6 (1991) 35–64

== Video ==
- Sheng: Bamboo Mouth Organs
