= James Hightower =

James Hightower could refer to:

- James Robert Hightower (1915–2006), American sinologist
- Jim Hightower (born 1943), American columnist and political activist
