= Betty Ann Wong =

American author, composer and multi-media musician

Betty Ann (Siu Junn) Wong (b. September 6, 1938; d. December 13, 2025) was an American author, composer, and multi-media musician. She received the 1988 Hollywood Dramalogue Critics Award for Outstanding Achievement for Original Music Theater for her work on Eugene O'Neill's Marco Millions. She has also composed film scores for Academy Award-winning movie producers Allie Light and Irving Saraf.

== Early life and training ==
A native of San Francisco, Wong and her twin sister Shirley grew up speaking Cantonese at home as well as English. Wong began piano lessons at age seven with Eva Chan, then studied with Lev Shorr. She received a B.A. in music from Mills College in 1960, where she studied with Morton Subotnick, Nathan Rubin, and Colin Hampton, and performed with Hysteresis, a women's creative arts group that included several Bay-area artists. In 1971, she completed a master's degree in music at the University of California, San Diego, where she studied composition with Pauline Oliveros, Robert Erickson, and Kenneth Gaburo. Wong also studied Chinese music with David Liang, Lawrence Lui, and Leo Lew.

== Career ==
In addition to piano, Wong played sitar, guzheng, saz (a Turkish lute), kanjira and several other traditional Asian instruments. She worked as a piano teacher at the San Francisco Music Conservatory and the University of California (San Diego). She also worked as an arts and crafts instructor and coordinator for the Community Center Chinese Music Workshops, where she and her sister, Shirley began teaching Chinese music in 1973. The workshops were a joint project of the Community Center and the San Francisco Conservatory of Music, funded through a Rockefeller grant.

With Shirley, Wong co-managed and performed with the Flowing Stream Ensemble (Chinese name: 流水音樂社), a sizhu (traditional silk and bamboo orchestra) that was founded in 1973. American composer and ethnomusicologist Valerie Samson also played with the group and studied with Wong.

After visiting New Delhi in 1974, Wong became interested in Hindustani music. She returned to California and took classes at the Center for World Music at the Julian Morgan Theater in Berkeley, California. Wong founded the Phoenix Spring Ensemble in 1977 to integrate European classical music, American jazz improvisation, and extended instrumental techniques with traditional Chinese music.

Wong composed film scores for the Academy Award-winning movie producers Allie Light and Irving Saraf. In 1988, she received the Hollywood Dramalogue Critics Award for Outstanding Achievement for Original Music Theater for her work with the American Conservatory Theater's production of Eugene O'Neill's Marco Millions. She has directed the Pursuit of Excellence Concert Series since 1990. Wong is also a board member of the Junior Bach Society.

== Death ==
Wong died of natural causes on December 13, 2025.

== Works ==
Wong's works include:

=== Books ===
- The Magic of Chinese Music (1975)
- "Possible Music for a Silent World" (an essay in Break Glass in Case of Fire: The Anthology From the Center for Contemporary Music; 1978)

=== CDs ===
- Desert Dreams of Light
- In Xinjiang Time (Phoenix Spring Ensemble in collaboration with Melody of China Ensemble; 2004)

=== DVDs ===
- Silk Road Experience

=== Electronic ===
- Check One: People Control the Environment, People are Controlled by the Environment (tape; 1970)
- Submerged, Still Capable (tape; 1969)

=== Multimedia ===
- All Sound is Music When You Let it Flow
- Dear Friends of Music, This is Your Piece as well as Mine (with audience participation; 1971)
- Furniture Music or Two-Way Stretch on a Swivel Chair (tape and visuals; 1971)
- Mad Tea Party (film and tape)
- Private Audience with Pope Pius XII (tape and slides; 1971)
- Quiet Places in the Environment (tape, 9 performers, and audience participation; 1971)
- Riding on to Glory (film and tape)

=== Orchestra ===
- Dream of the Desert (2000)

=== Theatre ===
- Music for the Good Citizen (an adaptation of The Good Woman of Setzuan by Bertolt Brecht)
- Village, Interracial, Big Wheels (tape)
