= Ear Magazine =

American music magazine

- Cover of Vol. 14, No. 2 (April 1989)
- Editor: Charles Shere, Beth Anderson, R.I.P. Hayman, Peter Wetzler, Carol Tuynman
- Categories: Music Magazine (new music focus)
- Frequency: Monthly
- Publisher: Ann Kish (1973–1975); New Wilderness Foundation (1976–1987); Ear, Inc. (1987–1992)
- First issue: January 1973
- Final issue: Fall 1991
- Country: United States
- Language: English

Ear Magazine was a monthly music magazine devoted to new music. The magazine was in circulation between 1973 and 1991. It often dealt with musical applications of feminism, politics, and the environment. It was also notable for its extensive listings of new music events in the Bay Area, and later, New York.

== History ==
Ear Magazine began as a volunteer-based effort in the Bay Area in 1973. It was first edited by Charles Shere and published by Ann Kish, though Beth Anderson became the principal editor by the fifth issue in May 1973. It was originally meant to provide a balance between traditional classical music and contemporary music. Originally published on newsprint, yet still referred to as a magazine, early Ear was notable for its extensive concert listings and for its promise to publish at least one new musical score in each issue. Several important composers, including Lou Harrison, Beth Anderson, and Gene Tyranny, among others, contributed new scores to early issues. Over time, Ear began focusing almost exclusively on new music with special attention being paid to Bay Area composers. As it was originally conceived of as a local magazine, it was primarily circulated at Bay Area concerts and at local booksellers.

=== Move to New York ===
In 1975, Beth Anderson moved to Brooklyn, NY and began publishing a version of Ear in New York, initially co-edited by Laurie Spiegel and Richard Hayman. Two Ears existed at this point until the California publication ended in the 1980s. In 1976, Ear began to be published by the "New Wilderness Foundation," a not-for-profit organization and began to be published in tabloid format. Valerie Samson became an editor in 1977. Anderson left the magazine at 1978, at which point R.I.P. Hayman took the position of editor. Carol Tuyman served as publisher 1980–1992. Starting in 1980, Ear began publishing themed issues, with occasional guest editors who were experts in the field. Helen Thorington served as its Radio Editor from 1987 to 1989; Thorington, Regine Beyer and Gregory Whitehead, co-edited the EAR Supplement, Festival for a New Radio in 1987. In 1989, the format was again changed to glossy 8 1/2 x 11. The magazine at this point was notable for its contributions from and exclusive interviews with a diverse array of notable contemporary composers and musicians, including Pauline Oliveros, Terry Riley, and Queen Latifah.

=== Final run ===
In 1990, Ear received sponsorship from Absolut Vodka. As part of its advertising campaign, Absolut helped to produce a series of CDs to supplement the articles in the magazine, which was a very popular campaign which doubled its subscriptions. In order to support the increased costs of production, Ear put on a benefit concert, which lost money. Additionally, Ear's printer declared bankruptcy. The final issue was a 1991 Fall Supplement.
