= Chia-ying Yeh =

Chinese-born Canadian poet and sinologist (1924–2024)

Chia-ying Yeh FRSC
- 叶嘉莹
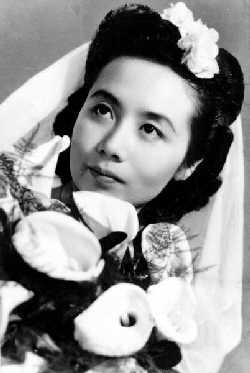
- Chia-ying Yeh's wedding photo (1948)
- Born: Florence Chia-ying Yeh; July 2, 1924; Beijing, China
- Died: November 24, 2024 (aged 100); Tianjin, China
- Other names: Ye Jiaying, Jialing, Chia-ying Yeh Chao, Chia-ying Chao-Yeh

Academic background
- Education: Fu Jen Catholic University (Beijing)
- Doctoral advisor: Gu Sui

Academic work
- Discipline: Chinese literature
- Sub-discipline: Classical Chinese literature
- Institutions: National Taiwan University; Harvard University; University of British Columbia; Nankai University
- Notable students: Pai Hsien-yung, Chen Yingzhen, Xi Murong, Jiang Xun

Chinese name
- Traditional Chinese: 葉嘉瑩
- Simplified Chinese: 叶嘉莹
Transcriptions
Standard Mandarin
- Hanyu Pinyin: Yè Jiāyíng
- Wade–Giles: Yeh^{4} Chia^{1}ying^{2}

Jialing
- Chinese: 迦陵
Transcriptions
Standard Mandarin
- Hanyu Pinyin: Jiālíng

Florence Chia-ying Yeh FRSC (July 2, 1924 – November 24, 2024), also known as Ye Jiaying (simplified Chinese: 叶嘉莹; traditional Chinese: 葉嘉瑩), Jialing (迦陵), and by her married name Chia-ying Yeh Chao, was a Chinese-born Taiwanese-Canadian poet and sinologist. She was a scholar of classical Chinese poetry. Yeh taught for 20 years at the University of British Columbia (UBC), and was a professor emerita from her retirement in 1989. She was a Fellow of the Royal Society of Canada. After retiring from UBC, she taught at Nankai University in Tianjin, where she was the founding Director of the Institute of Chinese Classical Culture.

== Early life and education ==
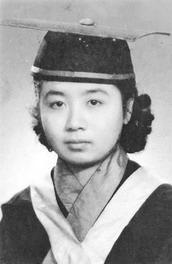
Chia-ying Yeh's school portrait

Chia-ying Yeh was born in Beijing on July 2, 1924. Her family was from the prominent Manchu clan of Yehe Nara, originally of Tümed Mongol ethnicity. The famous Qing dynasty poet Nalan Xingde was from the same clan. Her grandfather was a Qing official, and her sinicized family shortened its surname to the Han Chinese Yeh after the fall of the Manchu Qing dynasty in 1911.

Yeh began composing poetry at the age of ten. She was admitted to the Chinese department of Fu Jen Catholic University (Beijing) in 1941, where she studied under the well known scholar of poetry Gu Sui. After graduating in 1945, she taught in the then capital Nanjing, and married Chao Chung-sun (赵钟荪), a navy employee, in March 1948. By the end of the year, the Kuomintang government was losing the Chinese Civil War and began its retreat to Taiwan. Yeh also moved with her husband to Taiwan, and settled in Changhua, where Yeh found a teaching job at a secondary school. She gave birth to her first daughter Chao Yen-yen (赵言言) in August 1949.

During the White Terror period of Taiwan, numerous intellectuals were suspected of being Communist sympathizers and imprisoned without trial. In December 1949, Yeh's husband Chao Chung-sun was arrested on suspicion of being a Communist spy. In June 1950, Yeh was herself jailed, together with the principal and six other teachers at her school. She brought her daughter to the prison as the baby was less than a year old. She was released soon afterwards, but her husband was imprisoned for more than three years.

== Career and later life ==
In the 1950s, Yeh taught classical Chinese poetry at National Taiwan University, Tamkang University, and Fu Jen University in Taiwan. Writers Pai Hsien-yung, Chen Yingzhen, Xi Murong, and Jiang Xun were some of her students. She is often honoured as "the teacher of masters."

She moved to the United States in 1966, and taught at Michigan State University and Harvard University. She then settled in Vancouver, British Columbia, Canada, where she taught at the University of British Columbia from 1969 until retiring in 1989.

After Canada established diplomatic relations with the People's Republic of China, Yeh returned to China for the first time in 1974, and visited her brother who still lived in their old home. She composed a long poem to commemorate the visit.

Starting in 1979, Yeh returned to China every summer to teach at numerous universities, including Peking University, Beijing Normal University, Nankai University, Tianjin Normal University, Fudan University, Nanjing University, Nanjing Normal University, Xinjiang University, and Lanzhou University. She often paid for her own travel expenses and taught for free. She said that in mainland China there was a great desire to rediscover classical Chinese literature after the turmoil of the Cultural Revolution.

After Yeh retired from UBC in 1989, many Chinese universities invited her to teach in China full-time. She chose to teach at Nankai University in Tianjin, because her nephew was an alumnus and it was near her hometown Beijing. Nankai established the China Comparative Literature Institute (later renamed to Institute of Chinese Classical Culture) in 1993, headed by Yeh. She returned to UBC every summer to teach and research.

In May 2014, Nankai University held the Chinese Poetry International Seminar to commemorate Chia-ying Yeh's 90th birthday. For the occasion, former Chinese Premier Wen Jiabao wrote a work of calligraphy of one of Yeh's poems.

Yeh turned 100 on July 2, 2024, and died on November 24.

== Scholarships ==
Yeh donated half of her pension fund from UBC to establish two scholarships at Nankai University. One is called the Yongyan (Yung-Yen; 咏言) Scholarship, which combines the given names of her elder daughter Chao Yen-yen and son-in-law Chung Yung-t'ing (钟咏庭), who died together in a car accident in 1976. The other is called Tuo'an (驼庵), in memory of her teacher Gu Sui, whose hao was An-ming (安明).

== Works ==
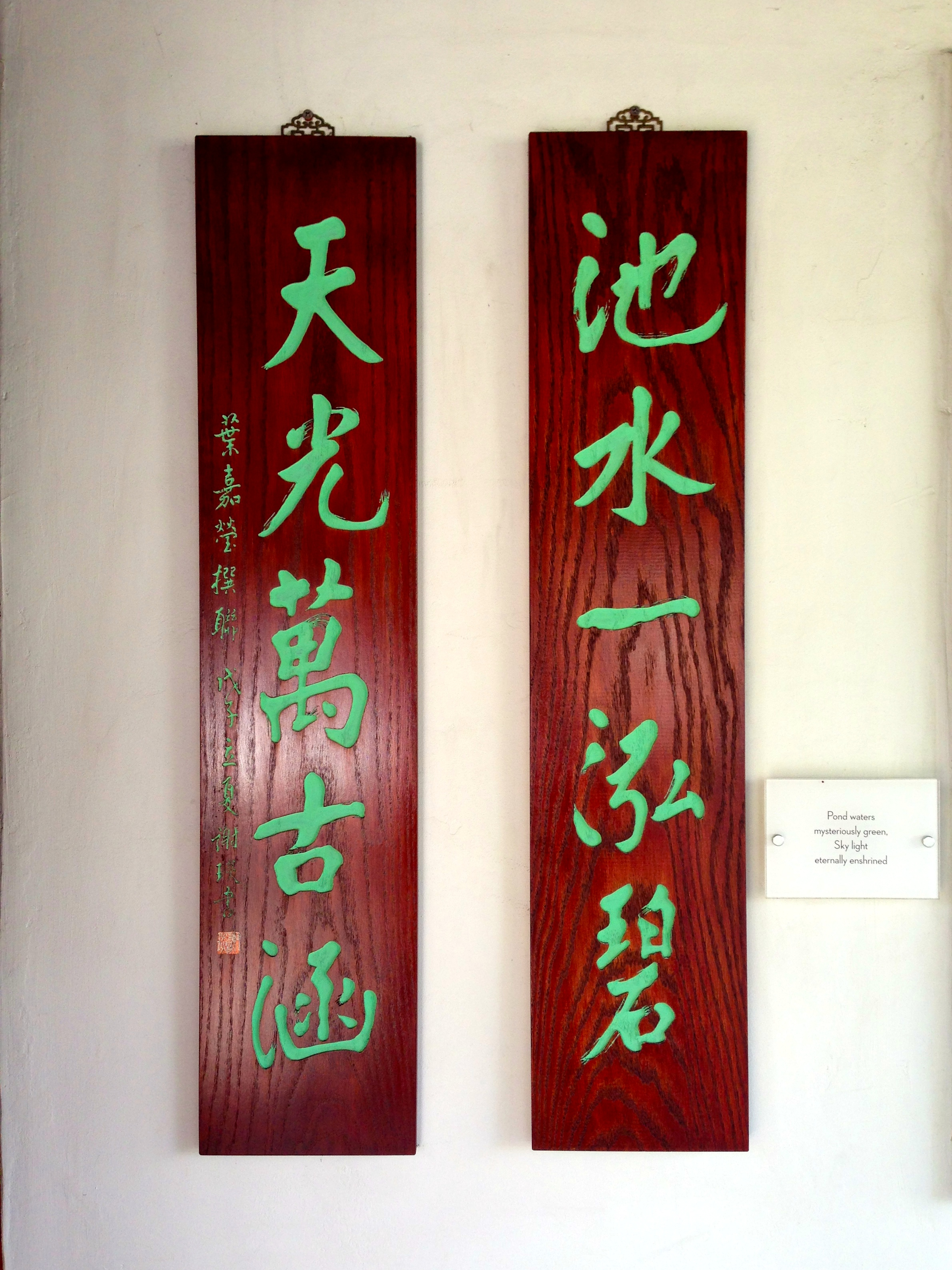
Yeh's poetry and calligraphy in the Dr. Sun Yat-Sen Classical Chinese Garden, Vancouver

Chia-ying Yeh published many scholarly works, almost all in Chinese. Her only major publication in English was Studies in Chinese Poetry (1998), co-written with Harvard University scholar James Robert Hightower. Her Jialing Poetry Manuscript, published in 2000 in Taipei, includes 540 poems she composed between 1939 (when she was 15) and 1995. She has been called a modern Li Qingzhao, the famous Song dynasty Chinese poet.

In 1997, Hebei Education Publishing House published The Collected Works of Jialing (迦陵文集) in 10 volumes. In 2000, Guiguan Book Company of Taiwan published The Collected Works of Chia-ying Yeh in 24 volumes.

== See also ==
- Kang-i Sun Chang
