= The Columbia Anthology of Chinese Folk and Popular Literature =

The Columbia Anthology of Chinese Folk and Popular Literature is a 2011 book edited by Victor H. Mair and Mark Bender and published by the Columbia University Press.

Jörg Bäcker of the University of Bonn described it as "the first large-scale anthology of the folk literature in China ever published in the West". The book includes oral literature from Han Chinese and ethnic minorities. This book is intended to be an introduction to the material and was written as a university textbook.

== Contents ==
Folk ballads, stories, and songs are within the book's first half. Most of these are from ethnic minority groups. 11 minority groups contributed 25 folktales, and the section also houses epic literature from different ethnic groups, as well as ritual literature from the Han and other ethnic groups. Epic stories involving the Yao people Miluotuo creation myth and epic stories from the Geser and Jangar are included. The section also houses over 70 folk songs and Han Chinese dragon tales. The volume does not discuss classification or typology of the folklore. Bäcker stated that the large number of differing ethnic groups involved and the differences in the text may make the reading difficult for those not specialists in Asia.

Professional storytelling excerpts are in the book's second half. Most of these are from the Han Chinese. Many of these texts have Buddhist and Confucian values and are life stories, including tragic love stories. The second half has two stories from the Bai people.

The book includes introductions for every section and introductions for every chapter. The introductions about minority literature refer to the pieces as "cultural documents". These introductions are often one to two pages long. Bäcker stated that some descriptions misleadingly make some texts appear more distinctive than they really are.

Bäcker argued that there are parts of the anthology which in many cases should have additional commentary and cultural notes, and others that "are richly and aptly annotated"; he puts the folktales, such as "The Gingseng Tale," in the former group, and the Jiangsu shan ge or wu ge folk songs in the latter group.

== Reception ==
Bäcker wrote that "All in all, the Columbia Anthology is an extremely fascinating and well-done work, and it offers new insights into a much neglected field of China's culture."

C. D. Smith of Grand Valley State University ranked the book as "Essential" and gave it four stars; he wrote that the book is "[a] necessary resource for those interested in Chinese literature, anthropology, and culture."

Loh Su Hsing of the Asian Review of Books described the anthology as "an impressive and worthwhile enterprise, offering a wonderful selection of folk literature that would otherwise not be accessible to the English-speaking reader."
