= James Robert Hightower =

American sinologist (1915–2006)

- Born: May 7, 1915; Sulphur, Oklahoma, United States
- Died: January 8, 2006 (aged 90); Herscheid, Germany
- Education: Harvard University (A.M., Ph.D.); University of Colorado Boulder (B.A.)
- Scientific career
- Fields: Chinese poetry, translation
- Academic advisors: Serge Elisséeff; Achilles Fang
- Notable students: David R. Knechtges; Victor H. Mair

Chinese name
- Traditional Chinese: 海陶瑋
- Simplified Chinese: 海陶玮
Transcriptions
Standard Mandarin
- Hanyu Pinyin: Hǎi Táowěi
- Gwoyeu Romatzyh: Hae Taurwoei
- Wade–Giles: Hai T'ao-wei

James Robert Hightower (7 May 1915 – 8 January 2006) was an American sinologist. He was a professor of Chinese at Harvard University who specialized in the translation of Chinese literature. Although he spent his youth in Colorado, Hightower lived most of his life in Cambridge, Massachusetts studying and teaching at Harvard.

== Life ==
Hightower was born to Loris Denzil and Berta (née McKedy) Hightower in Sulphur, Oklahoma, where Loris worked as a school principal. Hightower's mother died two years later in 1917, prompting his father to return home to Salida, Colorado to take up a position as school superintendent.

After completing high school, Hightower entered the University of Colorado Boulder and was a pre-medical Chemistry major. Hightower was also interested in literature and poetry: in his final year, having discovered Chinese poetry through the translations of Ezra Pound, he began taking courses in Chinese. Hightower became friends with writing student Jean Stafford, and both won fellowships to study philology for one year at the University of Heidelberg following graduation in 1936. Hightower attended the 1936 Summer Olympics in Berlin and witnessed Jesse Owens win his now-famous gold medals. Hightower lost interest in his Philology classes at Heidelberg and spent time in Belgium and Paris, where he briefly attended the Sorbonne and met James Joyce, before returning to the US in autumn 1937.

In late 1937, Hightower entered Harvard University's Department of Far Eastern Languages as a graduate student in Chinese. He received an A.M. degree in 1940 and then left for Beijing, where he briefly served as director of Yenching University's Sino-Indian Institute and worked on his doctoral dissertation. While at Harvard, Hightower had met and begun courting Florence "Bunny" Cole, a friend of Jean Stafford, and the two were married shortly before leaving for China. Bunny became pregnant in 1941 and returned to the US, but Hightower remained until the Japanese attack on Pearl Harbor, when all American and British nationals in Japanese-controlled China were put under house arrest for two years before being sent to an internment camp in Shandong Province in 1943. After several tense months, Hightower was freed in a Japanese-American prisoner exchange and returned to the United States, having smuggled out his dissertation hidden inside the walls of a large thermos. He spent the remainder of World War II in Washington, D.C. working on Japanese military codes under Edwin O. Reischauer.

Hightower returned to Harvard after the conclusion of World War II and completed his Ph.D. in comparative literature in 1946. His dissertation, a translation and study of the Han shi waizhuan (Outer Commentary on the Han Book of Songs), was published in 1952. Hightower's first major publication, Topics in Chinese Literature, was the first large-scale history of Chinese literature in a Western language.

== Selected works ==
- Topics in Chinese Literature: Outlines and Bibliographies (1950). Harvard-Yenching Institute Series, Volume III. Cambridge, Massachusetts: Harvard University Press, rpt. 1953.
- Han Shih Wai Chuan: Han Ying's Illustrations of the Didactic Application of the Classic of Songs (1952). Cambridge, Massachusetts: Harvard University Press.
- The Poetry of T'ao Ch'ien (1970). Oxford: Oxford University Press.
- (with Chia-ying Yeh) Studies in Chinese Poetry (1998). Cambridge, Massachusetts: Harvard University Asia Center.
- —— (1973). "Yuan Chen and the 'Story of Yingying'". Harvard Journal of Asiatic Studies. 33: 90–123. doi:10.2307/2718886. JSTOR 2718886.
