= Stephen H. West =

American sinologist (born 1944)

Stephen H. West, Ph.D. (Traditional Chinese: 奚如谷, pinyin: Xī Rúgǔ; born January 6, 1944) is a sinologist, philologist, and translator.

West received his Ph.D. from the University of Michigan. He formerly taught at University of California, Berkeley, where he held the position of Professor of Chinese, in the Department of East Asian Languages, and also served as executive director of the Inter-University Board of Chinese Language Studies. West then became professor of Chinese and head of the Chinese program at Arizona State University, in Tempe, Arizona, where he taught classes on classical Chinese and Chinese culture.

== English publications ==
- Records of the Three Kingdoms in Plain Language. (With Wilt L. Idema). Hackett Publishing Company, 2016.
- Vaudeville and Narrative: Aspects of Chin Theater. Münchener Ostasiatische Studien. Wiesbaden: Franz Steiner Verlag, 1977.
- China, 1976. (With other authors). Tucson: University of Arizona Press, 1978.
- Chinese Theater 1100-1450: A Source Book. (With Wilt L. Idema) Münchener Ostasiatische Studien. Wiesbaden: Franz Steiner Verlag, 1982.
- The Moon and the Zither: Wang Shifu's Story of the Western Wing. (With Wilt L. Idema). Berkeley: University of California Press, 1991.
- The Story of the Western Wing. (With Wilt Idema). Berkeley: University of California Press, 1995. (Rev. ed. of Moon and the Zither).

== See also ==
- List of Sinologists
