= CHINOPERL =

CHINOPERL: Journal of Chinese Oral and Performing Literature
- Discipline: Quyi, Chinese opera, Chinese literature
- Language: English
- Edited by: Margaret B. Wan

Publication details
- Former names: CHINOPERL Papers (1976–2012); CHINOPERL News (1969–1975)
- History: 1969–present
- Publisher: University of Hawaiʻi Press (2020–); Taylor & Francis (2016–2019); Maney Publishing (2013–2015); Cornell University
- Frequency: Semiannual

Standard abbreviations
- ISO 4: CHINOPERL

Indexing
- ISSN: 0193-7774 (print); 2051-6150 (web)
- OCLC no.: 859188526

CHINOPERL: Journal of Chinese Oral and Performing Literature, formerly CHINOPERL Papers and CHINOPERL News, is a peer-reviewed American academic journal dedicated to the study of Chinese performing arts like quyi and xiqu (Chinese opera). It is the only western-language journal devoted to this field.

The acronym CHINOPERL for Chinese Oral and Performing Literature was coined by Yuen Ren Chao.

== History ==
The CHINOPERL (Chinese Oral and Performing Literature) organization was founded in 1969 by a group of sinologists which included Yuen Ren Chao and his daughter Rulan Chao Pian, Nicholas Bodman, Milena Dolezelova, and Wolfram Eberhard, during a meeting at Cornell University. Its official publication was initially a newsletter titled CHINOPERL News. In 1976 it became a journal titled CHINOPERL Papers, and in 2013 it was renamed CHINOPERL: Journal of Chinese Oral and Performing Literature when it first published under Maney Publishing. (Maney was purchased by Taylor & Francis in 2016.) In 2020, the University of Hawaiʻi Press began to publish this journal.

== See also ==
- Asian Theatre Journal
