= Y. W. Ma =

Hong Kong literary Chinese professor

- Born: Yau-Woon Ma; 1940 (age 85–86); British Hong Kong
- Education: Yale University; University of Hong Kong
- Scientific career
- Fields: Chinese literature
- Workplaces: University of Hawaiʻi at Mānoa

Chinese name
- Traditional Chinese: 馬幼垣
- Simplified Chinese: 马幼垣
Transcriptions
Standard Mandarin
- Hanyu Pinyin: Mǎ Yòuyuán
Yue: Cantonese
- Jyutping: Maa^{5} Jau^{3} Wun^{4}

Yau-Woon Ma or Y. W. Ma (born 1940) is a Hong Kong sinologist. He is a professor emeritus of Chinese literature at the University of Hawaiʻi at Mānoa. He received his Ph.D. from Yale University in 1971. He has held visiting professorships in Stanford University, National Taiwan University, National Tsing Hua University, Tunghai University, Lingnan University, and the University of Hong Kong (where he received his bachelor's degree in 1965).

== Bibliography ==
- Ma, Y. W.; Lau, Joseph S. M., eds. (1986). Traditional Chinese Stories: Themes and Variations. Cheng & Tsui. ISBN 978-0887270710.
- Nienhauser, William H., ed. (1986). The Indiana Companion to Traditional Chinese Literature, Volume 1. Indiana University Press. ISBN 9780253334565. — as associate editor
