= Cambria Press =

Independent academic publisher based in Amherst, New York

- Founded: 2006; 20 years ago
- Country of origin: United States
- Headquarters location: Amherst, New York
- Publication types: Books
- Official website: www.cambriapress.com

Cambria Press is an independent academic publisher based in Amherst, New York. The publishing company was established by 2006, with its first titles released in September of that year. Cambria publishes academic monographs and new titles by scholars in a wide range of research fields, initially issuing approximately 50 titles per year. Cambria's academic and professional research titles undergo a peer-review process prior to final acceptance, and the publisher stipulates that its authors hold an appropriate terminal degree in their respective fields.

Cambria's titles are geared towards the specialised and research library market, via several partnership arrangements with wholesalers and distributors dealing with library acquisitions, in research and public libraries in North America and elsewhere. Cambria also markets some titles direct to educational institutions for classroom use, and to individual purchasers via online retailers and distributors to bookstores. Book distributors and wholesalers for Cambria titles include Blackwell and Ingram Books, and Cambria is a member of the Google Books Partner Program.
