= Victor H. Mair =

American sinologist and linguist (1943–2026)

- Born: March 25, 1943; East Canton, Ohio, U.S.
- Died: June 28, 2026 (aged 83); Philadelphia, Pennsylvania, U.S.
- Education: Dartmouth College (BA); SOAS University of London (BA, MPhil); Harvard University (PhD)
- Known for: Dunhuang manuscripts, Tarim mummies
- Spouse: Chang Li-ch'ing (Zhang Liqing) (m. 1969; died 2010)
- Scientific career
- Fields: Sinology
- Workplaces: University of Pennsylvania
- Thesis: Popular Narratives From Tun-huang (1976)
- Doctoral advisor: Patrick Hanan
- Other academic advisors: James Robert Hightower

Chinese name
- Traditional Chinese: 梅維恆
- Simplified Chinese: 梅维恒
Transcriptions
Standard Mandarin
- Hanyu Pinyin: Méi Wéihéng
- Gwoyeu Romatzyh: Mei Wei-herng
- Wade–Giles: Mei^{2} Wei^{2}-hêng^{2}
- IPA: [měɪ wěɪ.xə̌ŋ]

Victor Henry Mair (/mɛər/; March 25, 1943 – June 28, 2026) was an American sinologist and professor of Chinese at the University of Pennsylvania. Mair was the editor of the Columbia History of Chinese Literature and the Columbia Anthology of Traditional Chinese Literature and was the series editor of the Cambria Sinophone World Series (Cambria Press). His book Sacred Display: Divine and Magical Female Figures of Eurasia, coauthored with Miriam Robbins Dexter, won the Sarasvati Award for the Best Nonfiction Book in Women and Mythology.

== Life and career ==
Victor H. Mair was born in East Canton, Ohio on March 25, 1943. After high school, Mair attended Dartmouth College, where, in addition to his studies, he was a member of the Dartmouth Big Green men's basketball team. He graduated with an A.B. in 1965, then joined the Peace Corps and served in Nepal for two years. After leaving the Peace Corps in 1967, Mair returned to the United States and enrolled in the Buddhist Studies program at the University of Washington, where he began studying Buddhism, Sanskrit, and Classical Tibetan. In 1968, Mair won a Marshall Scholarship and moved to the School of Oriental and African Studies, University of London to further study Chinese and Sanskrit, receiving a B.A. (Hons) in 1972 and an M.Phil. in 1974. He then went to Harvard University to pursue doctoral studies in Chinese under the New Zealand scholar Patrick Hanan. He received a Ph.D. in 1976 with a doctoral dissertation entitled "Popular Narratives From Tun-huang", a study and translation of folk literature discovered among the Dunhuang manuscripts.

After completing his Ph.D., Mair joined the faculty at Harvard as an assistant professor and taught there for three years. In 1979, Mair left Harvard to join the faculty of the University of Pennsylvania, where he remained for the rest of his life. He was also founder and editor of Sino-Platonic Papers, an academic journal examining Chinese, East Asian and Central Asian linguistics and literature. He was twice a Fellow at the Swedish Collegium for Advanced Study in Uppsala, Sweden (Fall 2004, Spring 2008).

Mair specialized in early written vernacular Chinese, and was responsible for translations of the Dao De Jing (the Mawangdui Silk Texts version), the Zhuangzi and The Art of War. He also collaborated on interdisciplinary research on the archeology of Eastern Central Asia. The American Philosophical Society awarded him membership in 2007.

In 1969, Mair married Chang Li-ch'ing (Chinese: 張立青; pinyin: Zhāng Lìqīng; 1936–2010), a Chinese-Taiwanese scholar who taught Mandarin Chinese at the University of Washington, Tunghai University, Bryn Mawr College, Harvard University, the University of Pennsylvania, and Swarthmore College. Together they had one son, Thomas Krishna Mair.

Three of Mair's former students characterize his wide-ranging scholarship.

Victor has always cast his nets widely, and he could routinely amaze us with observations far afield from the Chinese text we were reading in class. Today people often attempt to simulate this cosmopolitanism under the rubric of interdisciplinary study, but for Victor, it was quite untrendy: he simply had an insatiable appetite for knowledge and pushing boundaries. Indeed, border-crossing has been our mentor's dominant mode of scholarship, a mode that has constantly interrogated where those very borders are both geographically and categorically. Though never sporting fashionable jargon, Victor has always taken on phenomena and issues that engage aspects of multiculturalism, hybridity, alterity, and the subaltern, while remarkably grounding his work in painstaking philological analysis. Victor demonstrates the success of philology, often dismissed as a nineteenth-century holdover, for investigating twenty-first-century concerns. (Boucher, Schmid, and Sen 2006:1)

Mair was a contributor to the linguistics blog Language Log.

Mair died from urinary tract cancer in Philadelphia, Pennsylvania, on June 28, 2026, at the age of 83.

== Pinyin advocacy ==
Mair was a long-time advocate for writing Mandarin Chinese in an alphabetic script (viz., pinyin), which he considered advantageous for Chinese education, computerization, and lexicography.

In the first issue of Sino-Platonic papers (1986), he suggested the publication of a Chinese dictionary arranged in the same familiar way as English, French, or Korean dictionaries: "single-sort alphabetical arrangement" purely based on the alphabetic spelling of a word, regardless of its morphological structure. Most Chinese words are multisyllabic compounds, where each syllable or morpheme is written with a single Chinese character. Following a two-millennia tradition, Chinese dictionaries – even modern pinyin-based ones like the Xinhua Zidian – are regularly ordered in "sorted-morpheme arrangement" based on the first morpheme (character) in a word. For instance, a Chinese dictionary user who wanted to look up the word Bābāduōsī 巴巴多斯 "Barbados" could find it under ba 巴 in traditional sorted-morpheme ordering (which is easier if one knows the character's appearance or radical but not its pronunciation) or under baba in single-sort alphabetic ordering (which is easier if one knows the pronunciation).

In 1990, after unsuccessfully trying to obtain financial support for an alphabetically collated Chinese-English dictionary, Mair organized an international team of linguists and lexicographers who were willing to work as part-time volunteers. Under the editorial leadership of John DeFrancis, they published the first general Chinese-English single-sort dictionary in 1996. According to the "Acknowledgments" (1996:ix), "This dictionary owes its genesis to the initiative of Victor H. Mair of Pennsylvania." A revised and expanded edition was published in 2000.

== Selected works ==
=== Books ===
- Victor H. Mair, Tun-Huang Popular Narratives (Cambridge [Cambridgeshire]; New York: Cambridge University Press, 1983). Influences from India seen in texts from Dunhuang caves.
- Victor H. Mair, Painting and Performance : Chinese Picture Recitation and Its Indian Genesis (Honolulu: University of Hawaiʻi Press, 1988).
- Victor H. Mair, Cheng Mei Bo Wang, Mei Cherng's "Seven Stimuli" And Wang Bor's "Pavilion of King Terng" : Chinese Poems for Princes (Lewiston, NY, US: E. Mellen Press, 1988).
- Victor H. Mair, T'ang Transformation Texts: A Study of the Buddhist Contribution to the Rise of Vernacular Fiction and Drama in China (Cambridge, Mass.: Council on East Asian Studies Harvard University: Distributed by Harvard University Press, 1989). Popular narratives of Buddhist motifs, known as bianwen (變文)
- Laozi, Victor H. Mair, tr. Tao Te Ching: The Classic Book of Integrity and the Way (New York: Bantam Books, 1990).
- Victor H. Mair Yongquan Liu, Characters and Computers (Amsterdam, Netherlands; Washington: IOS Press, 1991).
- Victor H. Mair, The Columbia Anthology of Traditional Chinese Literature (New York: Columbia University Press, 1994).
- Victor H. Mair, The Bronze Age and Early Iron Age Peoples of Eastern Central Asia (Washington, D.C.: Institute for the Study of Man Inc. in collaboration with the University of Pennsylvania Museum Publications, 1998).
- Zhuangzi Victor H. Mair, tr. Wandering on the Way: Early Taoist Tales and Parables of Chuang Tzu (Honolulu: University of Hawaiʻi Press, 1998).
- Songling Pu, Denis C. Mair Victor H. Mair, tr. Liaozhai Zhiyi Xuan (Beijing: Foreign Languages Press, 2000).
- J. P. Mallory and Victor H. Mair, The Tarim Mummies: Ancient China and the Mystery of the Earliest Peoples from the West. (2000). Thames & Hudson. London. ISBN 0-500-05101-1
- Victor H. Mair, The Columbia History of Chinese Literature (New York: Columbia University Press, 2001).
- Songling Pu, Denis C. Mair Victor H. Mair, tr. Liao Zhai Zhi Yi Xuan (Beijing Shi: Wai wen chu ban she, Di 1 ban., 2001).
- Victor H. Mair, Nancy Shatzman Steinhardt, Paul Rakita Goldin, eds. Hawai'i Reader in Traditional Chinese Culture (Honolulu: University of Hawaiʻi Press, 2005).
- Victor H. Mair, Contact and Exchange in the Ancient World (Honolulu: University of Hawaiʻi Press, 2006).
- Victor H. Mair, tr. The Art of War / Sun Zi's Military Methods (New York: Columbia University Press, 2007).
- Victor H. Mair and Erling Hoh, The True History of Tea (Thames & Hudson; illustrated edition, 2009). ISBN 978-0-500-25146-1 (Hardcover).
- Miriam Robbins Dexter and Victor H. Mair, Sacred Display: Divine and Magical Female Figures of Eurasia (Amherst, NY: Cambria Press, 2010).
- Victor H. Mair and Mark Bender (editors). The Columbia Anthology of Chinese Folk and Popular Literature. (New York: Columbia University Press, 2011).
- Victor H. Mair (editor). Buddhist Transformations and Interactions: Essays in Honor of Antonino Forte (Amherst, NY: Cambria Press, 2017).
- Yuanfei Wang and Victor Mair. Early Globalism and Chinese Literature Cambridge Element Series (Cambridge, UK: Cambridge University Press, 2026).

=== Articles ===
- Mair, Victor H. (1990). "Old Sinitic *Mᵞag, Old Persian Maguš, and English 'Magician'". Early China. 15: 27–47. JSTOR 23351579.
- — (1991). "What Is a Chinese "Dialect/Topolect"? Reflections on Some Key Sino-English Linguistic Terms". Sino-Platonic Papers. 29: 1–31.
- —; Mei, Tsu-Lin (1991). "The Sanskrit Origins of Recent Style Prosody". Harvard Journal of Asiatic Studies. 51 (2): 375–470. JSTOR 2719286.
- — (1994). "Buddhism and the Rise of the Written Vernacular in East Asia: The Making of National Languages". Journal of Asian Studies. 53 (3): 707–51. JSTOR 2059728.
