= Maney Publishing =

Independent academic publishing company

- Founded: 1997
- Defunct: 2015
- Successor: Taylor & Francis
- Country of origin: United Kingdom
- Headquarters location: Leeds, England
- Publication types: Books, academic journals
- Official website: maneypublishing.com

Maney Publishing was an independent academic publishing company that was taken over by Taylor & Francis in 2015. Maney Publishing specialised in peer-reviewed academic journals in materials science and engineering, the humanities, and health science. Maney published extensively for learned societies, universities, and professional bodies.

As of 2014, Maney published over 150 journals. The company offered an open access option (MORE OpenChoice) to all authors. The company had offices in Leeds and London in the United Kingdom, and in Boston and Philadelphia in the United States.

== History ==
Maney Publishing was formed in 1997, from a specialist typesetting and printing company, W.S. Maney & Son Ltd, which had been founded in Leeds in 1900. Maney's transition from printing to publishing was based on a series of long-standing relationships with learned societies and academic bodies. The oldest such partner was the English Goethe Society, with which Maney had worked since 1947. Organisations who started publishing agreements later included the Institute of Materials, Minerals and Mining, for whom Maney published journals and books from 2001. In 2007, Maney Publishing (USA) was incorporated to attract work from North American bodies.

Maney was acquired by Taylor & Francis (itself a part of Informa) in 2015 and its journals are now available on the Taylor & Francis Online website.
