= Stephen Owen (sinologist) =

American linguist and sinologist (1946–2026)

- Born: October 30, 1946; St. Louis, Missouri, U.S.
- Died: May 1, 2026 (aged 79); Cambridge, Massachusetts, U.S.
- Education: Yale University (BA, PhD)
- Spouse: Xiaofei Tian
- Scientific career
- Fields: Sinology
- Workplaces: Harvard University
- Thesis: The Poetry of Meng Chiao (751–814) and Han Yu (768–824) (1972)
- Doctoral advisor: Hans Fränkel

Chinese name
- Chinese: 宇文所安
Transcriptions
Standard Mandarin
- Hanyu Pinyin: Yǔwén Suǒ'ān

Stephen Owen (October 30, 1946 – May 1, 2026) was an American sinologist who specialized in Chinese literature, particularly Tang-dynasty poetry and comparative poetics. He was the James Bryant Conant University Professor at Harvard University, where he taught Chinese literature. He was a member of the American Academy of Arts and Sciences and the American Philosophical Society.

== Life and career ==
Owen was born in St. Louis, Missouri, on October 30, 1946. He graduated from Yale University with a Bachelor of Arts in Chinese literature in 1968 and obtained his Ph.D. from Yale in 1972 under the supervision of sinologist Hans Fränkel. His dissertation was titled, "The Poetry of Meng Chiao (751–814) and Han Yu (768–824): A Study of a Chinese Poetic Reform".

After receiving his doctorate, Owen taught at Yale until 1982, when he moved to Harvard University. He has been a Fulbright Scholar and received a Guggenheim Fellowship, among many other awards and honors. In 2015, he completed a six-volume annotated translation of the complete surviving poems of Du Fu, the culmination of an eight-year project. He was jointly awarded the 2018 Tang Prize in sinology with Yoshinobu Shiba "for his penetrating scholarship and theoretical ingenuity in Classical Chinese prose and poetry, especially Tang poetry and its translation."

Owen died in Cambridge, Massachusetts, on May 1, 2026, at the age of 79.

== Academic career ==
Owen wrote or edited dozens of books, articles, and anthologies in the field of Chinese literature, especially Chinese poetry. Harvard Magazine reported in 1998 that colleagues saw Owen as "a soaring and highly imaginative free spirit," comparing him to the eighth-century Chinese calligrapher Huaisu and to the foremost Tang dynasty poet, "the unfettered, convention-defying Li Bai..."

Of The Poetry of Meng Chiao and Han Yü, James J. Y. Liu said that it "represents a remarkable achievement, especially for a first book..." A reviewer in China Review International wrote "reading Stephen Owen's The Making of Early Chinese Classical Poetry shocked me, the way a seismic shift in paradigms will."

== Selected publications ==
- The Poetry of Meng Chiao and Han Yü. New Haven: Yale University Press, 1975. ISBN 0300018223.
- The Poetry of the Early T'ang. New Haven: Yale University Press, 1977. ISBN 0300021038.
  - Revised Edition, Quirin Press 2012, ISBN 978-1-922169-02-0.
- The Great Age of Chinese Poetry : The High T'ang. New Haven: Yale University Press, 1981. ISBN 0300023677.
  - Revised Edition, Quirin Press 2013, ISBN 978-1-922169-06-8.
- Traditional Chinese Poetry and Poetics: Omen of the World. Madison, Wis.: University of Wisconsin Press, 1985. ISBN 0299094200.
- Remembrances: The Experience of the Past in Classical Chinese Literature. Cambridge, Massachusetts: Harvard University Press, 1986. ISBN 0674760158 (alk. paper).
- Mi-Lou : Poetry and the Labyrinth of Desire. Cambridge, Massachusetts: Harvard University Press, Harvard Studies in Comparative Literature, 1989. ISBN 0674572750 (alk. paper).
- Readings in Chinese Literary Thought. Cambridge, Massachusetts: Council on East Asian Studies Distributed by Harvard University Press, Harvard-Yenching Institute Monograph Series, 1992. ISBN 0674749200.
- An Anthology of Chinese Literature: Beginnings to 1911. New York: W.W. Norton, 1st, 1996. ISBN 0393038238.
- The End of the Chinese 'Middle Ages': Essays in Mid-Tang Literary Culture. Stanford: Stanford University Press, 1996. ISBN 0804726663 (alk. paper) ISBN 0804726671 (pbk. alk. paper).
- The Late Tang: Chinese Poetry of the Mid-Ninth Century (827-860). Cambridge, Massachusetts: Harvard University Asia Center : Distributed by Harvard University Press, Harvard East Asian Monographs, 2006.ISBN 0674021371.
- The Making of Early Chinese Classical Poetry. Cambridge, Massachusetts: published by the Harvard University Asia Center: Distributed by Harvard University Press, Harvard East Asian Monographs, 2006. ISBN 0674021363.
- Kang-i Sun Chang and Stephen Owen, eds. The Cambridge History of Chinese Literature, Cambridge University Press, 2010.
- [trans.] The Poetry of Du Fu, 6 volumes. De Gruyter Mouton, 2015. ISBN 1614517126
- Just a Song: Chinese Lyrics from the Eleventh and Early Twelfth Centuries. Cambridge, Massachusetts: Harvard University Asia Center, 2019.ISBN 0674987128
- All Mine!: Happiness, Ownership, and Naming in Eleventh-Century China. New York: Columbia University Press, 2021. ISBN 9780231554879

== See also ==
- List of Guggenheim Fellowships awarded in 1986
