= Kang-i Sun Chang =

Chinese American sinologist (born 1944)

- 孫康宜
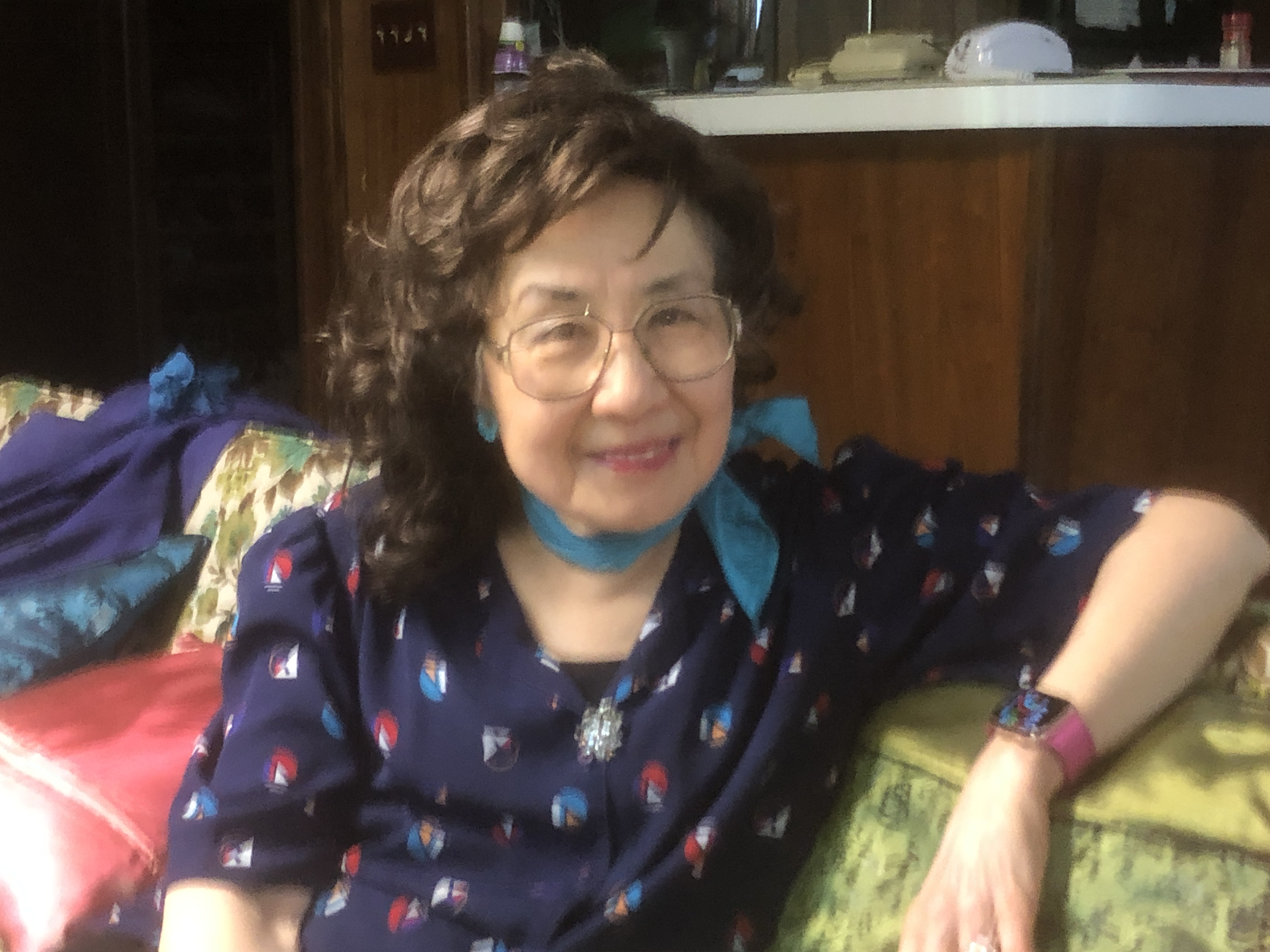
- Born: 21 February 1944 (age 82); Beijing, Republic of China
- Education: Tunghai University (BA); Rutgers University (MS); South Dakota State University (MA); Princeton University (MA, PhD)
- Spouse: Chhin-chhi Chezy Chang 張欽次
- Children: David Sun Chang, Edith Chang Luysterborghs

Chinese name
- Traditional Chinese: 孫康宜
- Simplified Chinese: 孙康宜
Transcriptions
Standard Mandarin
- Hanyu Pinyin: Sūn Kāngyí
- Wade–Giles: Sun^{1} K'ang^{1}-i^{2}
- IPA: [swə́n kʰáŋ.ǐ]

Kang-i Sun Chang (born Sun K'ang-i, Chinese: 孫康宜; 21 February 1944) is a Chinese-American sinologist who is a scholar of classical Chinese literature. She is the inaugural Malcolm G. Chace Professor at Yale University, where she was previously the chair of the Department of East Asian Languages and Literatures.

== Early life and education ==
Sun K'ang-i was born on 21 February 1944 in Beijing. Her father, Sun Yü-kuang (孫裕光) a.k.a. Paul Yu-kuang Sun, was from Tianjin, and her mother, Ch'en Yü-chen (陳玉真), was born in Kaohsiung, Taiwan. The couple met when they were both studying in Japan; they later moved to Beijing, where Yü-kuang taught at Peking University. In 1946, Peking University was unable to pay its employees due to hyperinflation. Influenced by his close friend Chang Wo-chün (張我軍), later a leading literary figure and the father of archaeologist Kwang-chih Chang, Sun Yü-kuang decided to follow Chang and move to Taiwan; Kang-i was two years old at the time.

In 1950, Sun Yü-kuang was arrested during the White Terror period of Taiwan, and imprisoned for ten years. Kang-i was barely six years old at the time of her father's arrest. According to her own account, she was traumatized by the event and suddenly lost the ability to speak Mandarin within a few days. From then on, she was only able to speak Taiwanese Hokkien, and had to relearn Mandarin in school. Throughout her school years she was bullied for speaking Mandarin with a Taiwanese accent.

After high school, Sun Kang-i chose to enroll at Tunghai University instead of the more prestigious National Taiwan University, because Tunghai's English professors were all either Americans or Britons. She graduated from Tunghai in 1966 with a B.A. in English literature and a minor in Chinese literature. She then studied for two years at the graduate school of National Taiwan University.

In 1968, Kang-i moved to the United States, where she studied at Rutgers University in New Jersey, earning a master's degree in library science in 1971. She then enrolled at South Dakota State University, where her husband was a faculty member, receiving an M.A. in English literature in 1972. She was mainly interested in English literature while growing up in Taiwan, and only became truly interested in Chinese literature after moving to the United States. She subsequently entered Princeton University, earning her M.A. in classical Chinese literature in 1976, and Ph.D. in 1978, with a minor in comparative literature. Her advisors were Yu-kung Kao, Andrew H. Plaks, F. W. Mote, Earl Miner, and Ralph Freedman. Her doctoral dissertation was titled, "The evolution of Tz'u from late T'ang to northern Sung: A genre study".

== Career ==
Chang returned to mainland China for the first time in 1979, and learned that while her father was imprisoned by the Kuomintang in Taiwan, her grandfather Sun Lisheng (孫勵生), who had remained in China, was persecuted by the Communists for his Taiwanese connection, and committed suicide in 1953.

From 1979 to 1980, Chang was a visiting assistant professor of Chinese literature at Tufts University. She then worked as curator of the Gest Library and East Asian Collections at Princeton University. She began teaching at Yale University in July 1982, becoming a tenured associate professor in 1986, and full professor in 1990. She served as chairperson of the Department of East Asian Languages and Literatures from 1991 to 1997, and director of graduate studies for many years.

Inspired by Kwang-chih Chang's autobiography, Kang-i Sun Chang published her own memoir Zou chu baise Kongbu, Farewell to the White Terror in 2003. A second edition was published in English in 2013 under the title Journey Through the White Terror: A Daughter’s Memoir.

In 2004, Cambridge University Press invited Chang to be the chief editor of The Cambridge History of Chinese Literature. She declined the job at first, but later changed her mind, and invited Stephen Owen of Harvard University as co-editor. The two-volume work was published in 2010.

== Recognition ==
In 2012, Chang was awarded the DeVane Medal for Excellence in Undergraduate Teaching and Scholarship by the Yale chapter of Phi Beta Kappa.

In 2015, Chang was inducted into American Academy of Arts and Sciences (AAAS) as a lifelong Fellow.

In 2016, Chang was elected as one of the 20 new Academicians of Academia Sinica.

== Publications ==
- The Evolution of Chinese Tz'u Poetry: From Late T'ang to Northern Sung (Princeton University Press, 1980).
- Six Dynasties Poetry (Princeton University Press, 1986).
- The Late-Ming Poet Ch'en Tzu-lung: Crises of Love and Loyalism (Yale University Press, 1991).
- Writing Women in Late Imperial China (Stanford University Press, 1997).
- Feminists Readings: Classical and Modern Perspectives (Taipei: Lianhe wenxu, 1998)
- Women Writers of Traditional China: An Anthology of Poetry and Criticism, with Haun Saussy and Charles Yim-tze Kwong, eds. (Stanford University Press, 1999).
- Voices of Literature (Taipei: Sanman, 2001).
- Challenges of the Literary Canon (Jiangxi: Baihuazhou wenyi Press, 2002).
- Farewell to the White Terror (Taipei: Asian Culture Press, 2003).
- The Evolution of Chinese Tz'u Poetry (Peking University Press, 2004).
- My Thoughts on the American Spirit (Taipei: Jiuge Publishing House, 2006).
- Tradition and Modernity: Comparative Perspectives, with Meng Hua, eds. (Peking University Press, 2007).
- Calligraphy of Ch'ung-ho Chang Frankel: Selected Inscriptions (Oxford University Press, 2009).
- Experiencing Yale (Beijing: Fenghuang Publishing House, 2009).
- Artistic and Cultural Traditions of the Kunqu Musicians (Guangxi Normal University Press, 2010).
- Quren Hongzhao, with Ch'ung-ho Chang Frankel. (Taipei: Lianjing Publishing House, 2010)
- The Cambridge History of Chinese Literature with Stephen Owen, eds. (Cambridge University Press, 2010).
- Journey Through the White Terror, translated by Kang-i Sun Chang and Matthew Towns, 2nd edition (National Taiwan University Press, 2013).
- Modern Perspectives on Classical Chinese Literature (Yiwen Publishing House, 2013).

== See also ==
- Chia-ying Yeh
