= Bianwen =

Stories written in vernacular Chinese during the Tang dynasty

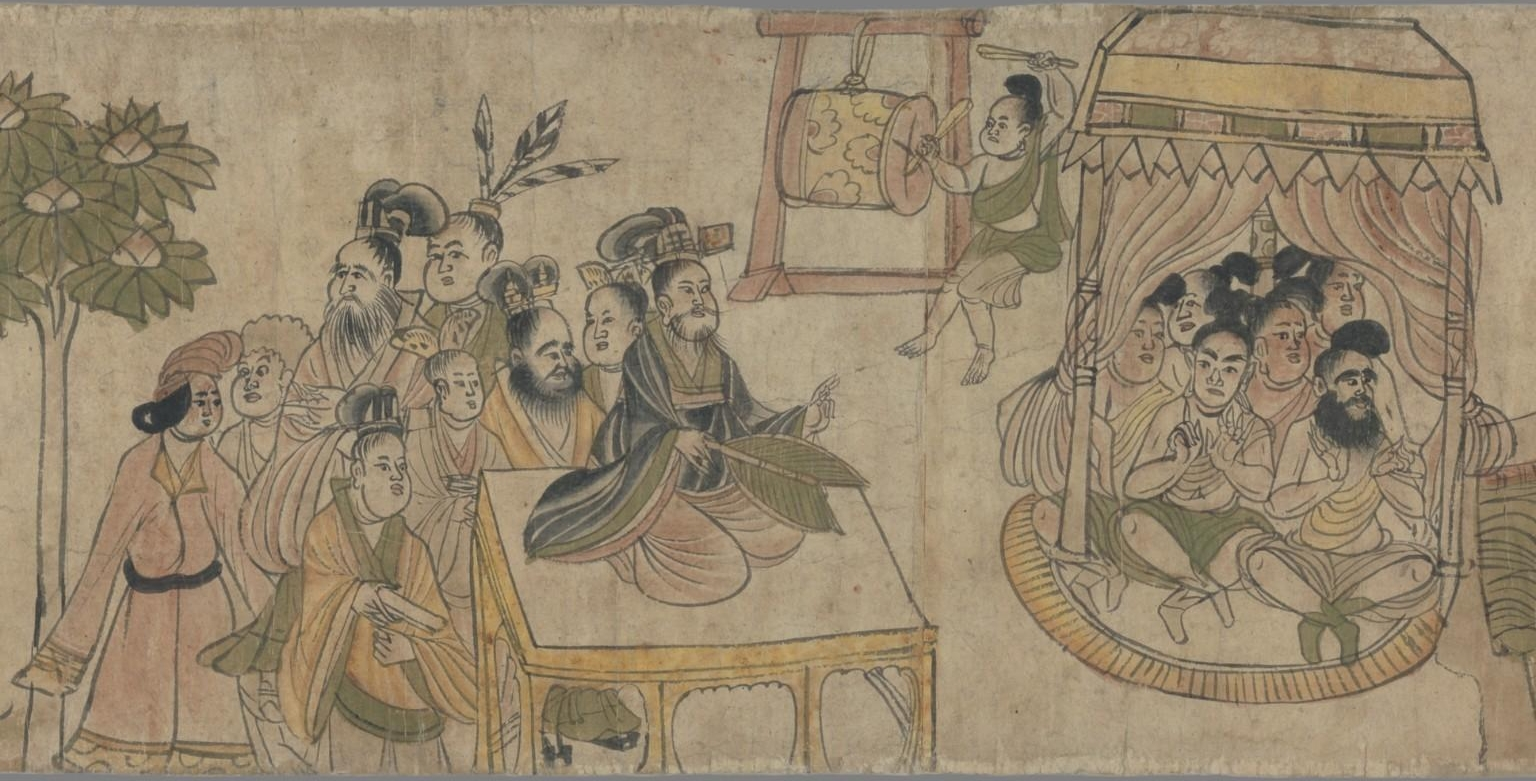
The Magical Combat (Jiang Mo Bian Wen) (降魔變文)

Bianwen (Chinese: 變文; pinyin: biànwén; lit. 'transformation texts') refers to a literary form that is believed to be some of the earliest examples of vernacular and prosimetric narratives in Chinese literature. These texts date back to the Tang dynasty (618–907) and Five Dynasties (907–960) periods, and were first discovered among a cache of manuscripts at Dunhuang, Gansu Province, China in the early twentieth century.

The form originated in the popularization of Buddhist doctrine through storytelling and pictorial representation and was closely related to oral and visual performance. The stories were then preserved in written form, and the ways in which they were told influenced secular storytelling. Therefore, historical and contemporary stories were also found in the Dunhuang bianwen manuscripts. Popular stories include Mulian Rescues His Mother, which originated in India but was made into a Chinese legend by the bianwen adaptations. By the Song dynasty, however, the form had largely died out.

Their anonymous authors, although literate, were not educated members of the official class, and the tales were intended to be performed by people who could not read or write. Their language reflects the spoken language of the Tang period. The genres and themes of the tales were quite diverse and many of their forms and themes were significant in Chinese literary development.

== Definition ==
Bianwen, used as a convenient label for a type of literary form, has not yet been sufficiently defined. Disagreements over what bian means, what characteristics or formal features a text must have in order to be subsumed under the term, and consequently which texts are considered as bianwen have plagued scholars since the discoveries of the manuscripts.

Professor Victor H. Mair of the University of Pennsylvania, the most productive Western scholar on bianwen, proposes to adopt a more stringent definition than most other scholars. He identifies the following characteristics as the qualifying criteria for bianwen: "a unique verse-introductory (or pre-verse) formula, an episodic narrative progression, homogeneity of language, an implicit or explicit relationship to illustrations, and prosimetric structure." This definition results in a corpus of less than 20 extant bianwen manuscripts, some of which are titled with the term in it, others titled without the term but nevertheless share certain formal features with the majority of the established bianwen manuscripts. This small corpus can be further categorized, according to their stylistic features, into verse and prose.

== Relationship with Bianxiang ==
Bianxiang (變相) refers to the transformation of a Buddhist sutra into a pictorial representation. That bianwen is inextricably linked to bianxiang is not disputed, but the precise nature of the relationship remains undetermined. Professor Bai Huawen of Peking University speculates that bianwen was performed in combination with bianxiang pictures, and that the text was in effect a prosimetric literary script of the performance. He further conjectures that in addition to painted scrolls, wall-paintings and painted banners were also used in conjunction with bianwen for performances. However, given their complementary nature, bianwen did not necessarily have to be appended to pictures, because a given bianwen can be used as the script for a variety of art works.

== Literary influences ==
Bianwen has had a long lasting and wide-ranging impact on the subsequent development of Chinese literature. The evolution of prosimetric literature in the Song, Yuan, and Ming periods has ties to the bianwen; vernacular stories in China would not have been as well understood without reference to bianwen; and later popular literature inherited its prosimetric form and vivid quality of the stories from bianwen. Both fiction and drama after the Tang have to some degree been influenced by bianwen. To be more specific, included but not limited in its sphere of influence are the yuequ (樂曲; musicals), the zhugongdiao (諸宮調; all keys and modes, or medleys), the cihua (詞話; prosimetric stories), the guci (鼓詞; drum lyrics), the tanci (彈詞; strum lyrics), the muyushu (木魚書; wooden fish books), zaju (雜劇; miscellaneous drama), and chuanqi (傳奇).

== Translations and further reading ==
- Bai, Huawen 白化文, and Victor Mair. "What is Pien-wen?" Harvard Journal of Asiatic Studies 44.2 (1984): 493–514.
- Chen, Lili 陳荔荔. “Outer and Inner Forms of Chu-kung-tiao, With Reference to Pien-wen, Tz'u and Vernacular Fiction.” Harvard Journal of Asiatic Studies 32 (1972): 124–149.
- Eoyang, Eugene. “Oral Narration in the Pien and Pien-wen.” Archiv Orientální: Journal of the Czechoslovak Oriental Institute 46 (1978): 232–252.
- Hiroshi, Arami 荒見泰史. Dunhuang bianwen xieben de yanjiu 敦煌變文寫本的研究. Beijing: Zhonghua shuju, 2010.
- Johnson David. “The Wu Tzu-hsu Pien-wen and Its Sources: Part I.” Harvard Journal of Asiatic Studies 40.1 (1980): 93–156.
- Johnson David. “The Wu Tzu-hsu Pien-wen and Its Sources: Part II.” Harvard Journal of Asiatic Studies 40.2 (1980): 465–505.
- Lu, Hsiao-Peng. “The Fictional Discourse of Pien-wen: The Relation of Chinese Fiction to Historiography.” Chinese Literature: Essays, Articles, Reviews 9.1/2 (1987): 49–70.
- Kim, Moonkyong. “The Literature of Tun-huang.” Acta Asiatica: Bulletin of the Institute of Eastern Culture 82 (2002): 18–33.
- Mair, Victor. T'ang Transformation Texts: A Study of the Buddhist Contribution to the Rise of Vernacular Fiction and Drama in China. Cambridge, Massachusetts: Council on East Asian Studies, Harvard University, 1989; 286p. (Harvard-Yenching Institute Monograph, 28). ISBN 978-0-674-86815-1.
- Mair, Victor. “The Contributions of T’ang and Five Dynasties Transformation Texts (pien-wen) to Later Chinese Popular Literature.” Sino-Platonic Papers 12 (1989): 1–71.
- Mair, Victor. Tun-huang Popular Narratives (Cambridge: Cambridge University Press, 1983; 329p. Cambridge Studies in Chinese History, Literature, and Institutions). ISBN 978-0-521-24761-0.
- Neil Schmid. "Tun-huang Literature," esp. "Prosimetric Literature," in Victor H. Mair, ed., The Columbia History of Chinese Literature. (New York: Columbia University Press, 2001), ISBN 978-0-231-52851-1, pp. 982–988.
- Waley, Arthur, Ballads and Stories from Tun-huang: Anthology (London: Allen & Unwin, 1960), Includes "Meng Jiangnu", "Mu-lian Rescues his Mother", and Buddhist pieces. Reprinted by Routledge, 2012, ISBN 978-1-135-65119-0.
- Buddhism and the secular in Dunhuang Bianwen compositions. Yang Yi. Soc. Sci. China XVI:3 Autumn:1995 pp. 121 – 132.
