= Pingshu =

Chinese performing art

Pingshu / Pinghua
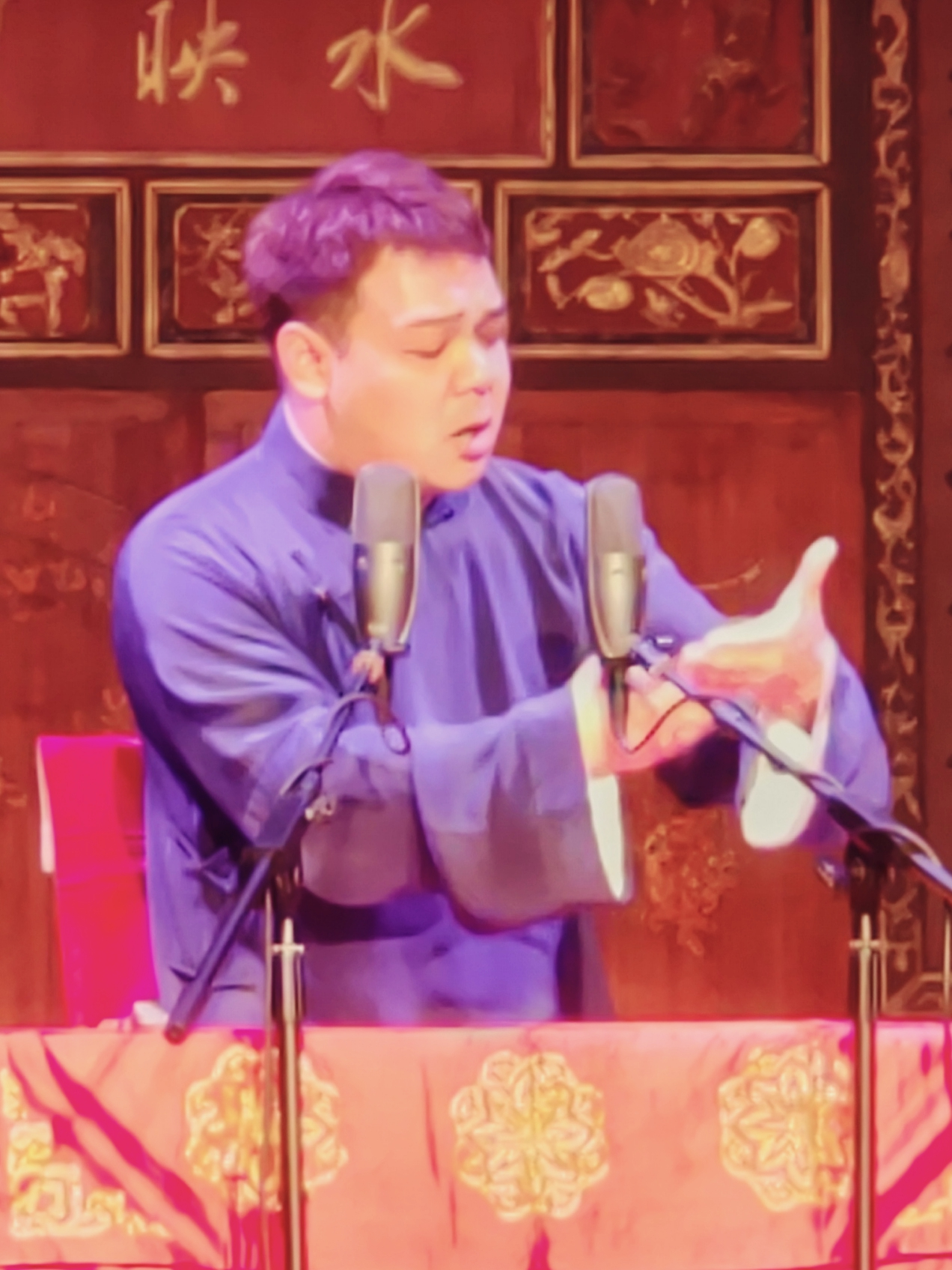
- Yangzhou pinghua in Nanjing, 2019
- Native name: 评书, 评话
- Typical instruments: None

Pingshu
- Traditional Chinese: 評書
- Simplified Chinese: 评书
Transcriptions
Standard Mandarin
- Hanyu Pinyin: píngshū

Pinghua
- Traditional Chinese: 評話
- Simplified Chinese: 评话
Transcriptions
Standard Mandarin
- Hanyu Pinyin: pínghuà

Shuoshu
- Traditional Chinese: 說書
- Simplified Chinese: 说书
Transcriptions
Standard Mandarin
- Hanyu Pinyin: shuōshū

Shuohua
- Traditional Chinese: 說話
- Simplified Chinese: 说话
Transcriptions
Standard Mandarin
- Hanyu Pinyin: shuōhuà

Pingshu (Chinese: 评书) or pinghua (Chinese: 评话), also colloquially known as shuoshu (Chinese: 说书), refers to the traditional Han Chinese performing art of storytelling with no musical accompaniment. It is better known as pingshu in northern China and pinghua in southern China.

== Performing art ==
Pingshu performers often wear changshan and stand behind a table, with a folded fan and a gavel (serving as a prop to strike the table as a warning to the audience to be quiet or as a means of attracting attention in order to strengthen the effect of the performance, especially at the beginning or during intervals). They often add their own commentaries on the subjects and the characters in their storytelling. In this way, the audience, while watching their performances, is not only entertained, but also educated and enlightened.

The art of storytelling, with its broad mass appeal, has resulted in the growth of other art forms, nurturing talented artists. Many great writers, in consequence, continued from there to tread the path of literature, using many of the oral storytelling traditions to form the skeleton of novels such as Journey to the West and Romance of the Three Kingdoms.

Stories such as General Yue Fei (說岳全傳), Cavalier with White Eyebrows (白眉大侠), and Romance of the Sui and Tang Dynasties (隋唐演義) are a popular subject among young and old. Famous storytellers or Pingshu performers such as Shan Tianfang (单田芳, 1934-2018), Yuan Kuocheng (袁阔成, 1929-2015), Tian Lianyuan (田连元, born 1941), and Liu Lanfang (刘兰芳, born 1944) consequently became well known.

In order to attract the new generation of listeners, some non-traditional content was also adopted as Pingshu, like Harry Potter.

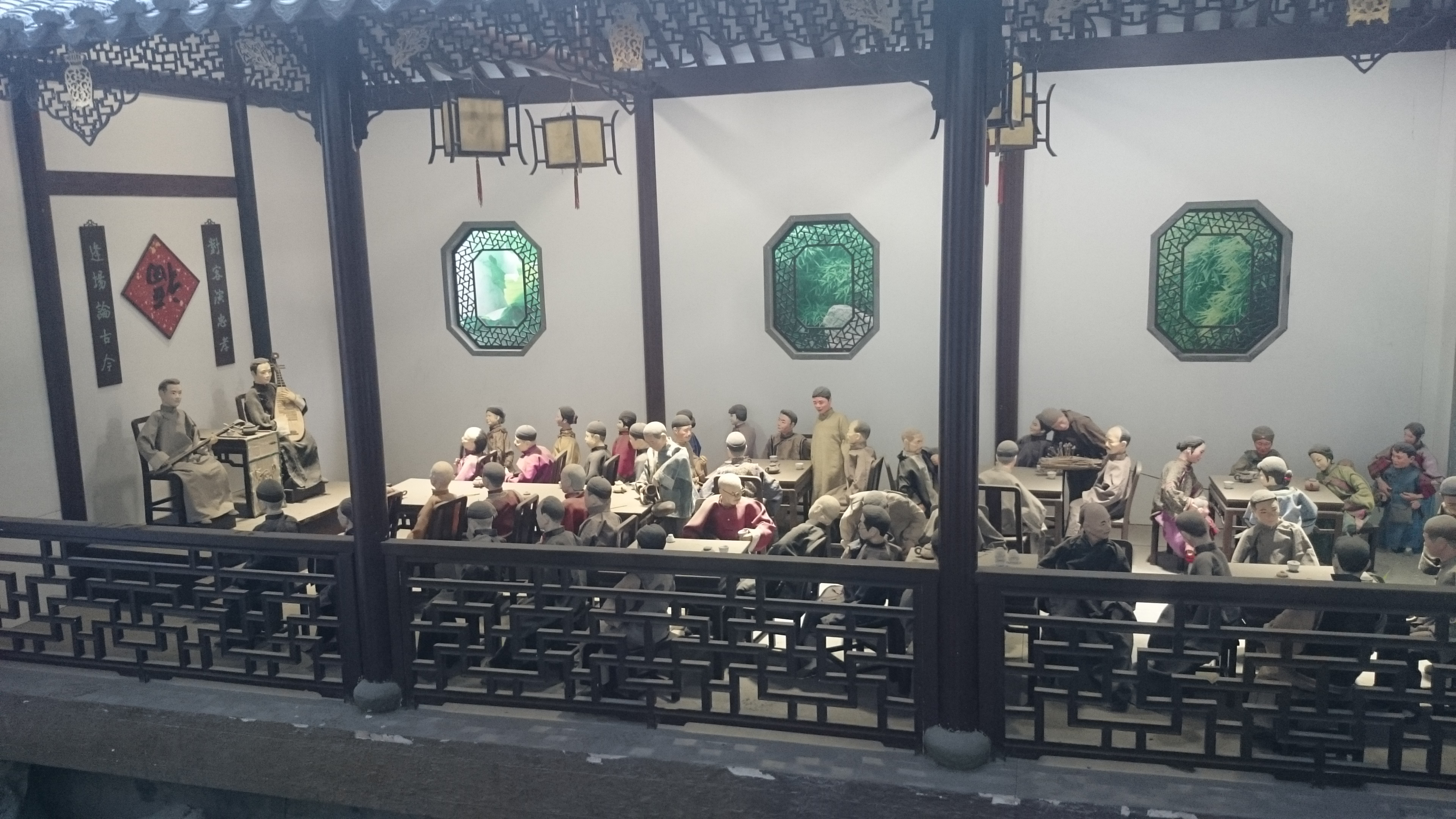
A miniature model of a late Qing period shuoshu performance.

== History ==
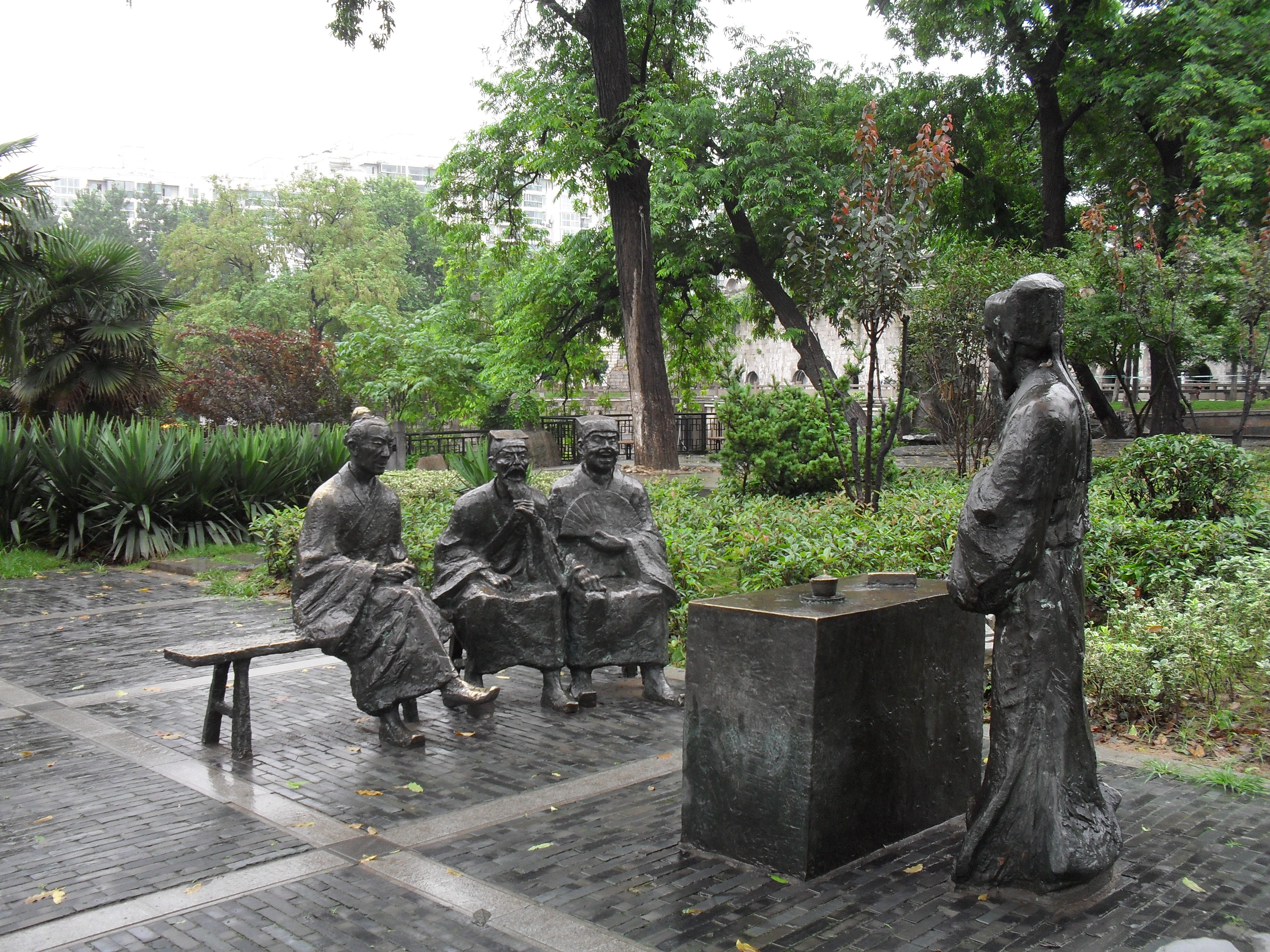
Statue depicting pingshu.

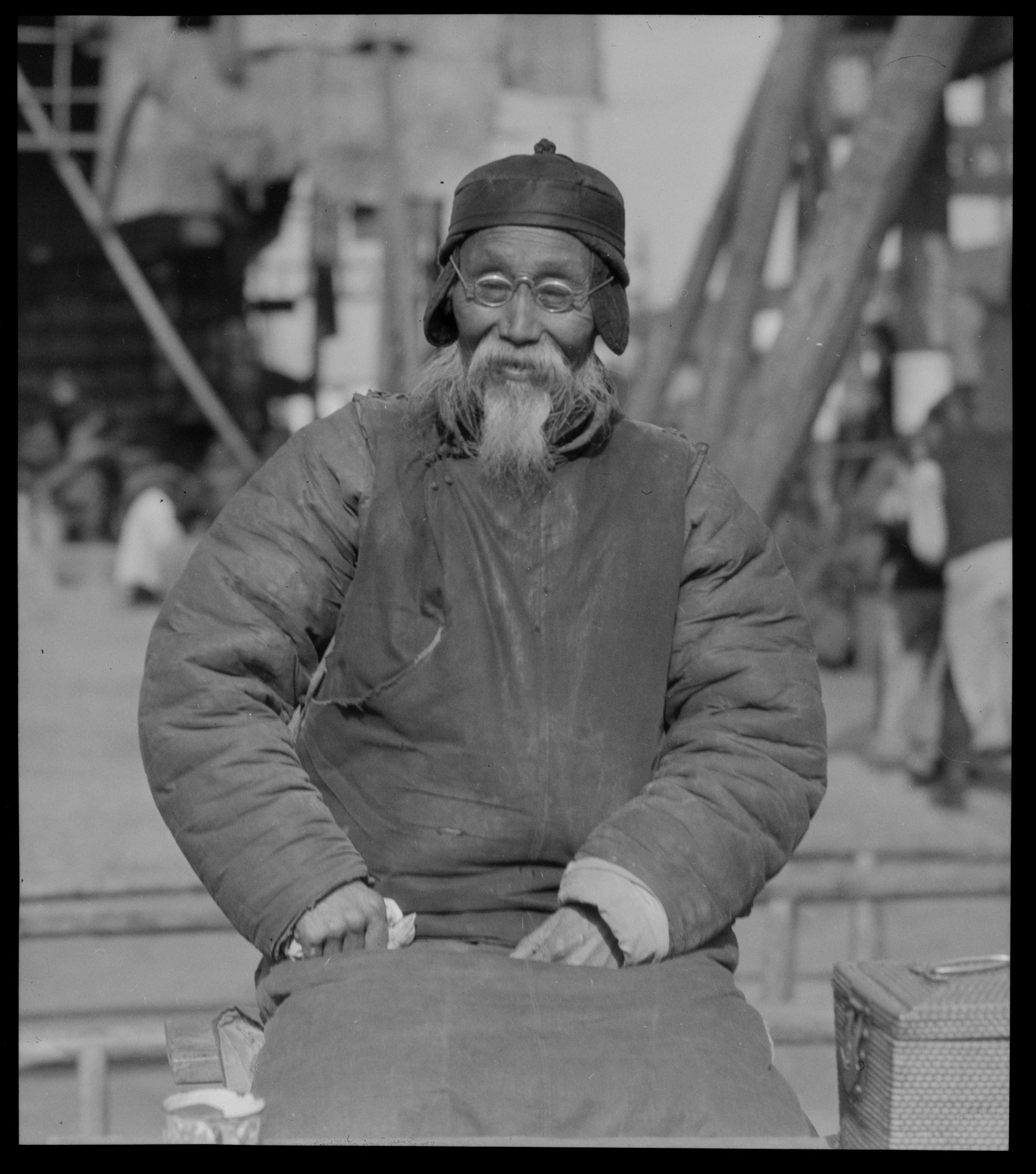
A storyteller on Nanjing street.

The history of pingshu can be roughly traced back to the Tang and Song dynasties, known then as "shuohua" (說話). The storytelling form likely began in the Tang dynasty as a form of reciting Buddhist stories and teachings, or Bianwen, and developed into a more widespread and general form of performing art by the Song dynasty. With the metropolitan growth of the Song, shuohua became a very popular form of folk entertainment. In the fifth volume of Dongjing Meng Hua Lu by Meng Yuanlao listed many notable of folk storytelling artists in detail, such as Huo Sijiu, a man from Kaifeng in the Northern Song Dynasty, who was famous for "telling the Three Kingdoms" (說三分) and who would "go to various theaters to watch people every day, regardless of wind, rain, heat, or cold".

The founder of modern pingshu was Liu Jingting, in the late Ming to early Qing dynasties. It was originally just a part of the storytelling art called "zidishu" (子弟書). His teacher, Mo Houguang, mentioned that the theory of storytelling was: "Although storytelling is a minor skill, it is no different from the way of Confucian scholars in terms of distinguishing temperament, examining local customs, and describing all kinds of people. Therefore, it should be unrestrained in its approach, subtle in its moderation, swift in its pace, peaceful in its unfolding, lingering in its conclusion, and clean in its conclusion. If one is not the most skilled in the world, who can compete with this!" During the late Qing Dynasty, in the Guangxu era, storytelling was introduced into the imperial palace. However, due to the inconvenience of singing in the palace, it was renamed "pingshuo" (評說), thus solidifying its status as an art form.

With the advancement of technology, pingshu maintained its popularity through radio drama programs and television broadcasts.

== See also ==
- Audiobook
- Radio drama
- Rakugo
