= Classic Chinese Novels =

Canon of the greatest Chinese novels

Four Classic Novels in Chinese opera

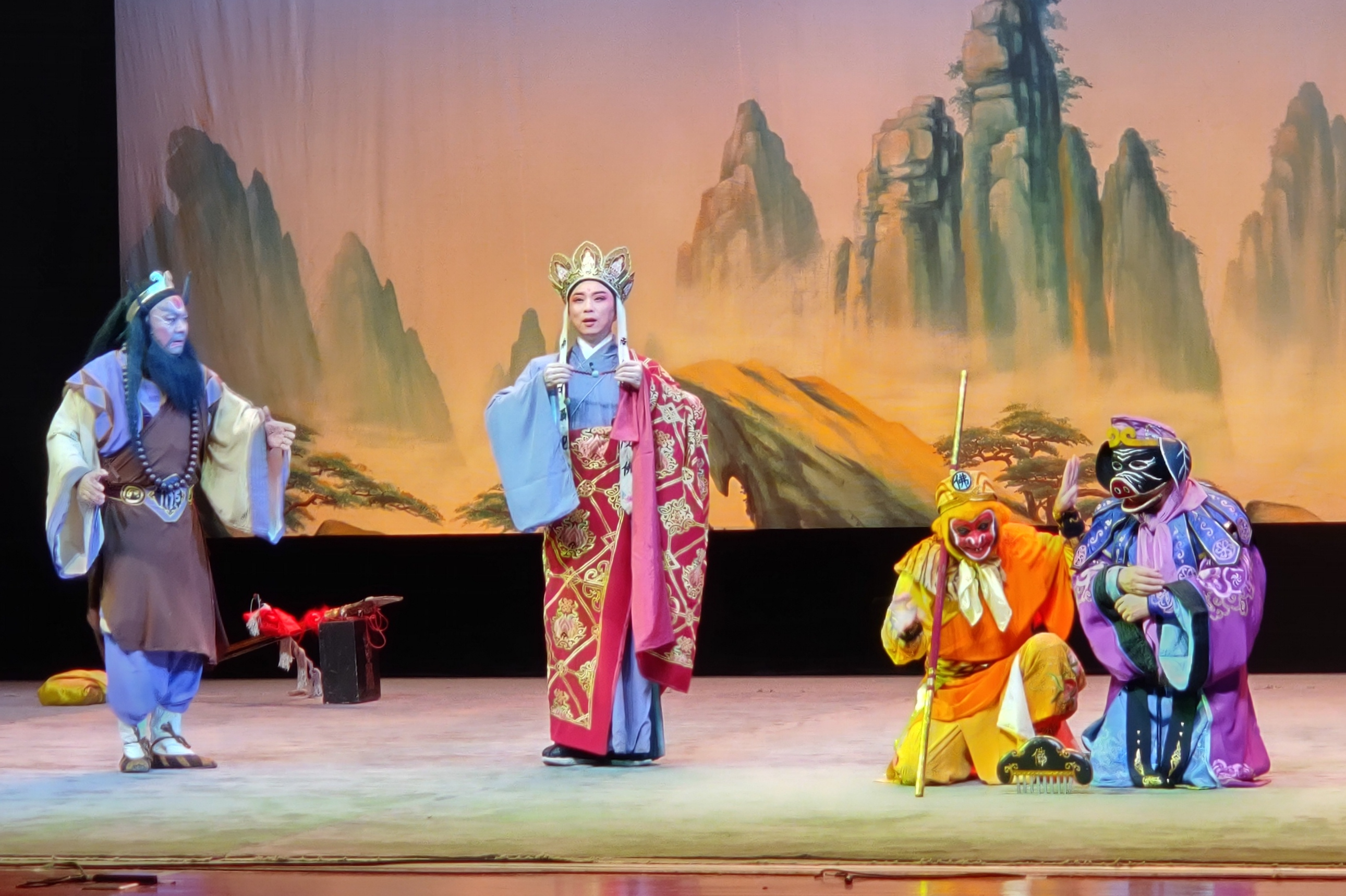
Sha Wujing, Tang Sanzang, Sun Wukong, and Zhu Bajie (Journey to the West) in Shao opera

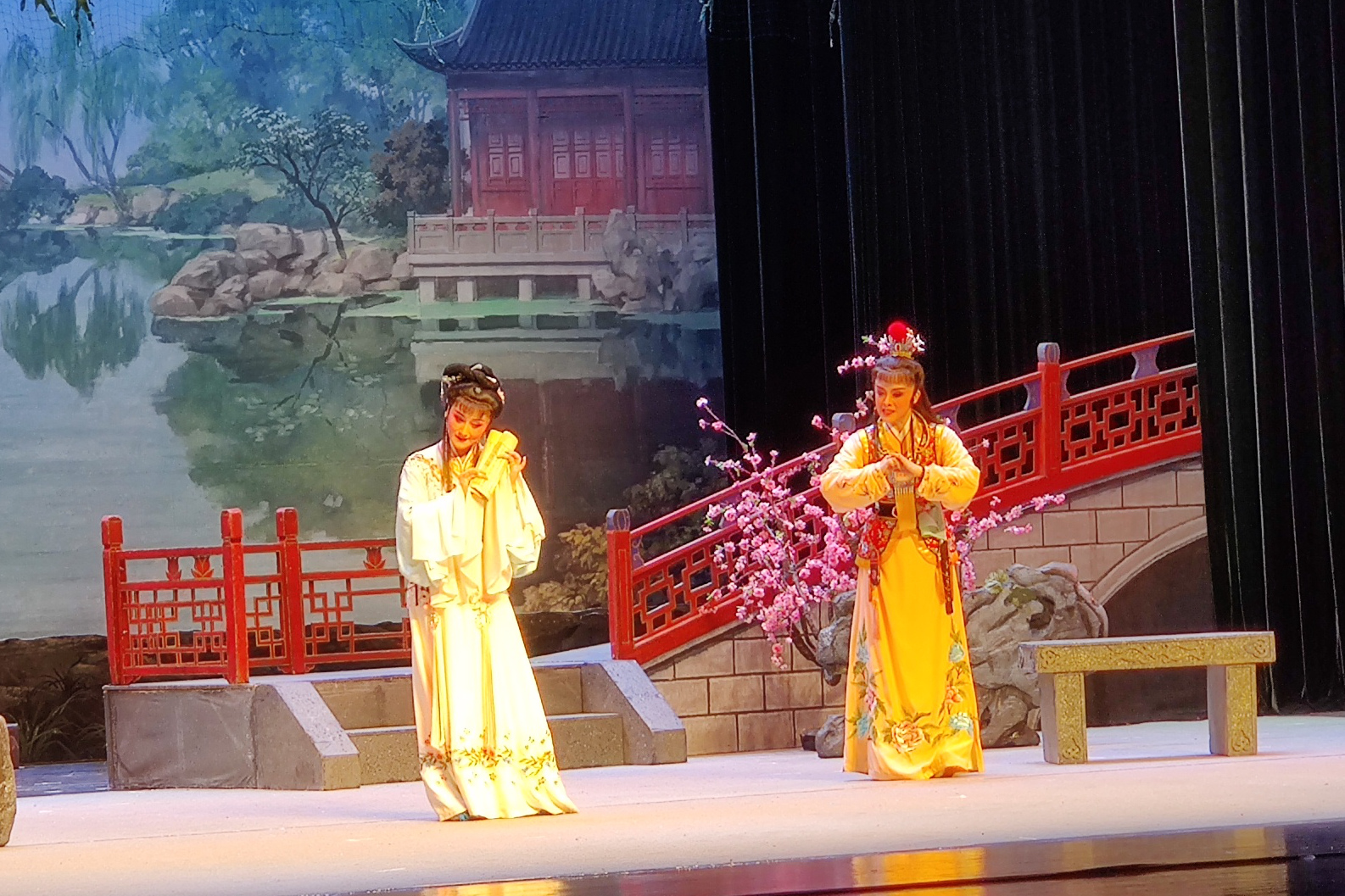
Lin Daiyu and Jia Baoyu (Dream of the Red Chamber) in Yue opera

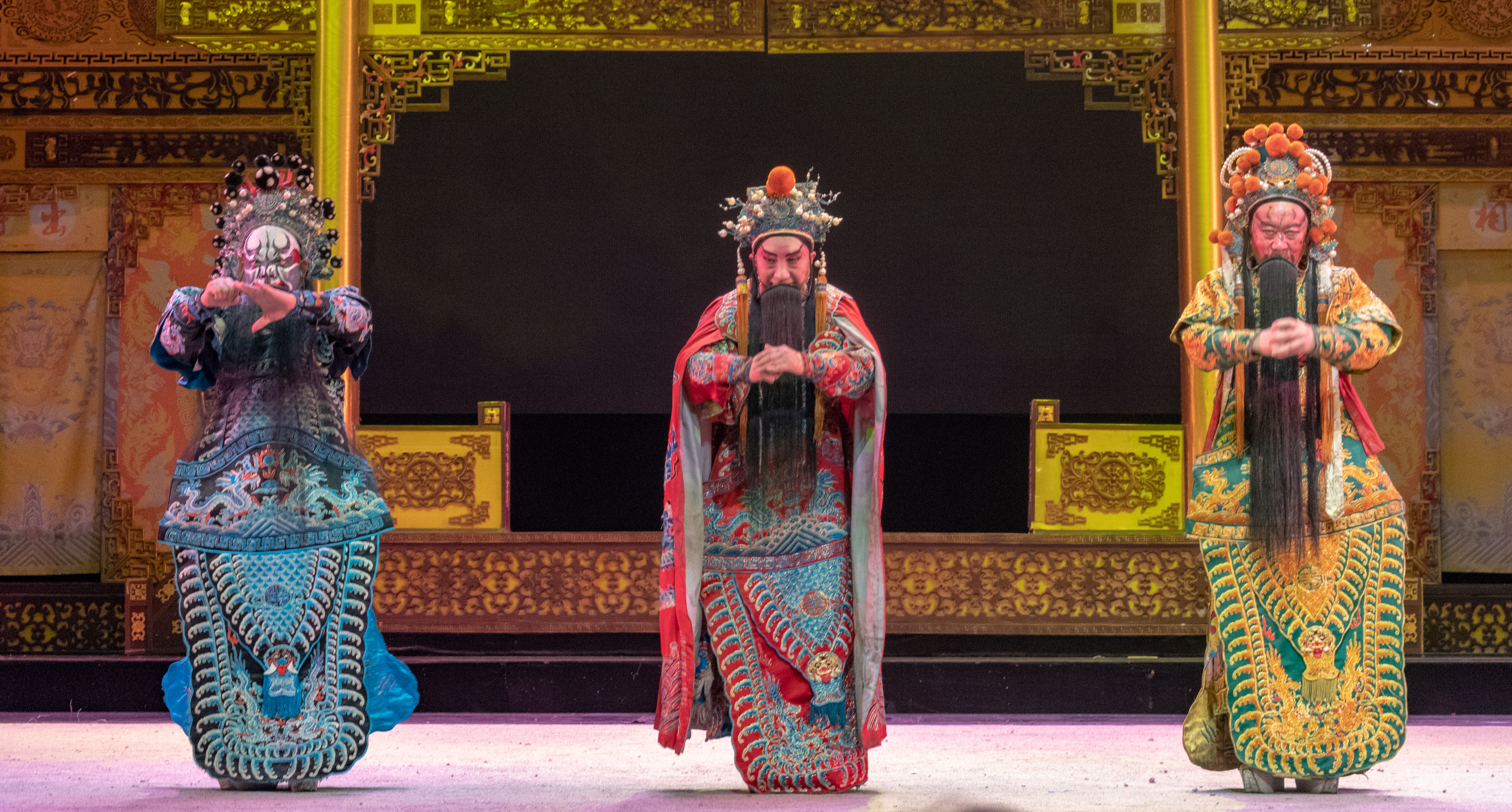
Zhang Fei, Liu Bei, and Guan Yu (Romance of the Three Kingdoms) in Sichuan opera

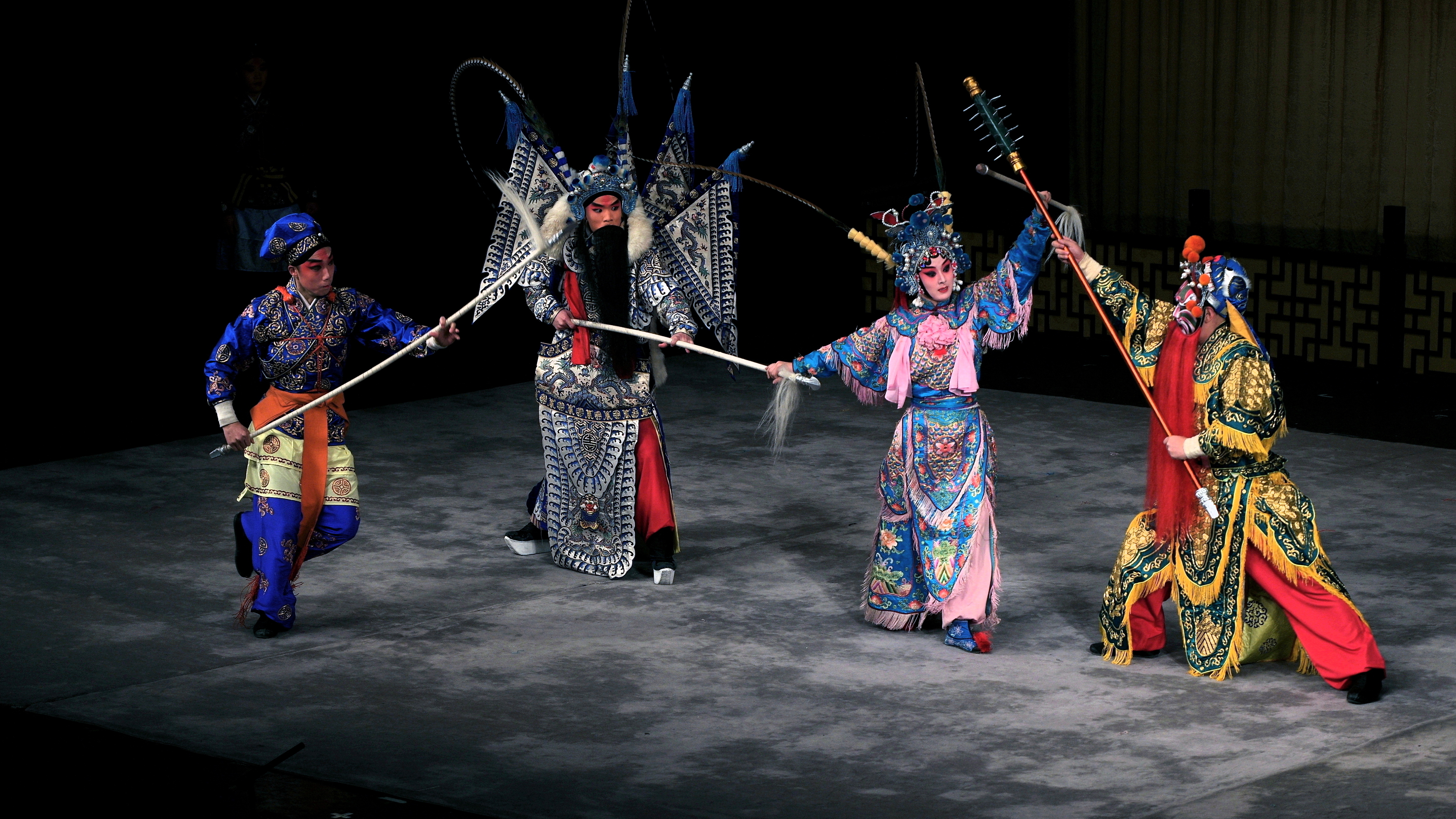
Ma Lin, Lin Chong, Hu Sanniang, and Qin Ming (Water Margin) in Peking opera

Classic Chinese Novels (traditional Chinese: 古典小說; simplified Chinese: 古典小说; pinyin: gǔdiǎn xiǎoshuō) are the best-known works of literary fiction across pre-modern Chinese literature. The group usually includes the following works: Ming dynasty novels Romance of the Three Kingdoms, Water Margin, Journey to the West, and The Plum in the Golden Vase; and Qing dynasty novels Dream of the Red Chamber and The Scholars.

These works are among the world's longest and oldest novels. They represented a new complexity in structure and sophistication in language that helped to establish the novel as a respected form among later popular audiences and erudite critics. The Chinese historian and literary theorist C. T. Hsia wrote in 1968 that these six works "remain the most beloved novels among the Chinese."

During the Ming and Qing dynasties, Chinese novels inspired sequels, rebuttals, and reinventions with new settings, sometimes in different genres. Far more than in the European tradition, every level of society was familiar with the plots, characters, key incidents, and quotations. Those who could not read knew them through tea-house story-tellers, Chinese opera, card games, and new year pictures. In modern times they live on through popular literature, graphic novels, cartoons and films, television drama, video games, and theme parks.

== Nomenclature and subgroupings ==
The literary critic and sinologist Andrew H. Plaks writes that the term "classic novels" in reference to these six titles is a "neologism of twentieth-century scholarship" that seems to have come into common use under the influence of C. T. Hsia's The Classic Chinese Novel (1968). He adds that he is not sure at what point in the Qing or early twentieth century this became a "fixed critical category", but the grouping appears in a wide range of critical writing. Paul Ropp notes that "an almost universal consensus affirms six works as truly great". Hsia views them as "historically the most important landmarks" of the novels of China.

There have been a number of groupings. Romance of the Three Kingdoms, Journey to the West, Water Margin and The Plum in the Golden Vase were grouped by publishers in the early Qing and promoted as Four Masterworks (Chinese: 四大奇書; pinyin: Sìdàqíshú; lit. 'four great masterpieces'). Because of its explicit descriptions of sex, The Plum in the Golden Vase was banned for most of its existence. Despite this, Lu Xun, like many if not most scholars and writers, places it among the top Chinese novels. After the Communist takeover in China, the official People's Literature Publishing House successively republished the collated editions of Water Margin, Romance of the Three Kingdoms, Dream of the Red Chamber and Journey to the West between 1952 and 1954 (It would not republish The Plum in the Golden Vase until 1957 and in 1985). Since the early 1980s, they have been known in mainland China as the Four Great Classic Novels (Chinese: 四大名著; pinyin: Sìdàmíngzhù).

== Textual history and attributed authorship ==
None of the six were published in the authors' lifetime. Romance of the Three Kingdoms and Water Margin appeared in many variants and forms long before being edited in their classic form in the late Ming. There is considerable debate on their authorship. Since the novel, unlike poetry or painting, had little prestige, authorship was of little interest in any case. While tradition attributes Water Margin to Shi Nai'an, there is little or no reliable information on him or even confidence that he existed. The novel, or portions of it, may have been written by Luo Guanzhong, perhaps Shi's student, who was the reputed author of Romance of the Three Kingdoms, or by Shi Hui (施惠) or Guo Xun (郭勛). Journey to the West is the first to show strong signs of a single author who composed all or most of the text, which became more common in later novels.

In the late Ming and early Qing, new commercial publishing houses found it profitable to re-issue novels that claimed specific authors and authentic texts. They commissioned scholars to edit texts and supply commentaries to interpret them. Mao Zonggang, for instance, and his father Mao Lun, edited Three Kingdoms and Jin Shengtan edited Water Margin, supplying an introduction to which he signed Shi Nai'an's name. In each case the editor made cuts, additions, and basic alterations to the text, misrepresenting them as restoring the original. They also supplied commentaries with literary and political points that modern scholars sometimes find strained. Their editions, however, became standard for centuries, and most modern translations are based on them. Zhang Zhupo likewise edited The Plum in the Golden Vase. Zhang worked on an abridged and rewritten text of 1695; the 1610 text, however, was more coherent and presumably closer to the author's intent.

It has been argued that the history of several of these masterpieces, such as Water Margin, The Plum in the Golden Vase, and Romance of the Three Kingdoms, appearing in new recensions with commentary during the seventeenth century, reflects a more general conservative intellectual trend in the early Qing.

In chronological order of their earliest forms, they are:

English	Pinyin	Attributed to	Century	Earliest extant printed edition	Editor standard recension	Recension year	Dynasty of Setting	Years of Setting	Complete and Unabridged English Translations	Genre
Romance of the Three Kingdoms	Sānguó Yǎnyì	Luo Guanzhong	14th century	1494 (preface); 1522	Mao Lun and Mao Zonggang	1660	Han and Three Kingdoms	168–280	Charles Henry Brewitt-Taylor; Moss Roberts	Historical fiction
Water Margin	Shuǐhǔ Zhuàn	Shi Nai'an; Luo Guanzhong	14th century	1589	Jin Shengtan (71-chapters version)	1643	Northern Song	1120s	71-chapter version: J. H. Jackson and Fang Lo-Tien, restored and edited by Edwin H. Lowe; 100-chapter version: Sidney Shapiro; 120-chapter version: Alex and John Dent-Young (help from John Minford)	Historical fiction, wuxia
Journey to the West	Xī Yóu Jì	Wu Cheng'en	16th century	1592			Tang	629–646	Dr. Anthony C. Yu; William Jenner	Gods and demons fiction (shenmo), historical fiction, fantasy
Jin Ping Mei (The Plum in the Golden Vase)	Jīn Píng Méi	The Scoffing Scholar of Lanling	16th century	1610	Zhang Zhupo	1695	Northern Song	1111-27	1610 version: David Tod Roy; 1628-44 version: Clement Egerton and Lao She	Historical fiction, erotic fiction, novel of manners, Family saga
Dream of the Red Chamber	Hónglóu Mèng	Cao Xueqin	18th century	1791–92	Cheng Weiyuan and Gao E	1792	Qing	Early to mid-18th century	Yang Xianyi and Gladys Yang; David Hawkes and John Minford	Family saga, philosophical novel
The Scholars	Rúlín Wàishǐ	Wu Jingzi	18th century	1750		1803	Ming	Early 16th century	Yang Xianyi and Gladys Yang	Historical fiction, social novel, philosophical novel

== Background ==
From early times, Chinese writers preferred history as the genre for telling stories about people, while poetry was preferred for personal expression of emotion. Confucian literati, who dominated cultural life, looked down on other forms as xiao shuo (lit. “little talk” or “minor writings”), the term that in later times came to be used for fiction. Early examples of narrative classics include Bowuzhi, A New Account of the Tales of the World, Soushen Ji, Wenyuan Yinghua, Great Tang Records on the Western Regions, Miscellaneous Morsels from Youyang, Taiping Guangji and Yijian Zhi. The novel as an extended prose narrative that realistically creates a believable world evolved in China and in Europe from the 14th to 18th centuries, though a little earlier in China. Chinese audiences were more interested in history and were more historically minded. They appreciated relative optimism, moral humanism, and relative emphasis on collective behavior and the welfare of the society.

The rise of a money economy and urbanization under the Song dynasty led to a professionalization of entertainment which was further encouraged by the spread of printing, the rise of literacy, and education. In both China and Western Europe, the novel gradually became more autobiographical and serious in exploration of social, moral, and philosophical problems. Chinese fiction of the late Ming dynasty and early Qing dynasty was varied, self-conscious, and experimental. In China, however, there was no counterpart to the 19th-century European explosion of novels. The novels of the Ming and Qing dynasties represented a pinnacle of classic Chinese fiction.

Until World War II, the dominant sinological scholarship considered all fiction popular and therefore directly reflective of the creative imagination of the masses. C. T. Hsia, however, established the role of the scholar-literati in the creation of vernacular fiction, though not denying the popular subject matter of some texts. Scholars then examined traditional fiction for sophisticated techniques.

The American literary critic and sinologist Andrew H. Plaks argues that Romance of the Three Kingdoms, Water Margin, Journey to the West as well as Jin Ping Mei (not considered one of the four classic novels but discussed by him as one of the four masterworks of the Ming dynasty) collectively constituted a technical breakthrough reflecting new cultural values and intellectual concerns. Their educated editors, authors, and commentators used the narrative conventions developed from earlier storytellers, such as the episodic structure, interspersed songs and folk sayings, or speaking directly to the reader, but they fashioned self-consciously ironic narratives whose seeming familiarity camouflaged a Neo-Confucian moral critique of late Ming decadence. Plaks explores the textual history of the novels (all published after their author's deaths, usually anonymously) and how the ironic and satirical devices of these novels paved the way for the great novels of the 18th century.

Plaks further shows these Ming novels share formal characteristics. They almost all contain more than 100 chapters; are divided into ten-chapter narrative blocks, each broken into two- to three-chapter episodes; are arranged in symmetrical halves; and arrange their events in patterns that follow seasons and geography. They manipulated the conventions of popular storytelling in an ironic way in order to go against the surface meanings of the story. Three Kingdoms, he argues, presents a contrast between the ideal—that is, dynastic order—and the reality of political collapse and near-anarchy; Water Margin likewise presents heroic stories from the popular tradition in a way that exposes the heroism as brutal and selfish; Journey to the West is an outwardly serious spiritual quest undercut by comic and sometimes bawdy tone. Jin Ping Mei is the clearest and most sophisticated example: the action is sometimes grossly sexual, but in the end emphasizes conventional morality.

== Influence ==
These novels influenced the development of vernacular fiction in later Chinese literary history. Traditionally, fiction and drama were not held in high regard in the Chinese and East Asian literary culture, and they were generally not seen as true "literature" by the literati who dominated intellectual life. Writers in these forms did not have the same level of prestige as poets or scholars of Chinese classics. The late Ming and early Qing dynasty versions of these novels, however, included commentaries that were printed between the lines, so that the reader saw them as part of the text. These commentaries interpreted the text in sometimes strained ways, but established critical and aesthetic criteria, modeled on those of poetry and painting, that gave fiction a new legitimacy.

These novels were written in a mixture of vernacular and classical Chinese, though some were more completely vernacular. For instance, Romance of the Three Kingdoms is known for its mix of classical prose with folklore and popular narratives, while the Dream of the Red Chamber is known for the use of poetry within its mostly vernacular style. These novels popularized and legitimatized the role of vernacular literature in literary circles.

In the late imperial periods, with the wide spread of commercial printing, Chinese novels also became heavily circulated across East and Southeast Asia; it was reported in 1604, several hundreds of titles of Chinese books came through to the Japanese port city of Nagasaki alone, and throughout the seventeenth and eighteenth centuries, over a thousand Chinese titles are estimated to have been imported every year. Their prominence proved to be crucial in the development of literature in these places.

== See also ==
- Historical novels ("yanyi", "yeshi" or "baishi" novels)
  - Chronicles of the Eastern Zhou Kingdoms
  - Romance of the Sui and Tang
  - Shuo Tang
  - The General Yue Fei
  - Yu Shaobao cui zhong quanzhuan
- Shenmo novels ("fantasy")
  - The Three Sui Quash the Demons' Revolt
  - Investiture of the Gods
  - Flowers in the Mirror
  - The Story of Han Xiangzi
  - The Eunuch Sanbao's Voyage to the Western Ocean
- Erotic novels ("yanshi")
  - The Carnal Prayer Mat
  - The Embroidered Couch
  - Langshi
  - Zhulin yeshi
  - Chanzhen houshi
- Caizi jiaren novels ("romance novels")
  - Ping Shan Leng Yan
  - Haoqiu Zhuan
  - Yu Jiao Li
  - Huatu yuan
  - Jinxiang ting
- Gong'an novels ("crime fiction")
  - Wanhua Lou
  - Celebrated Cases of Judge Dee
  - The Seven Heroes and Five Gallants
  - The Five Younger Gallants
  - Judge Bao fiction
- Literati novels ("wenren xiaoshuo")
  - Xingshi Yinyuan Zhuan
  - Cu hulu
  - Xiyoubu
  - Shenlou zhi
  - Ernü Yingxiong Zhuan

== Works cited ==
- Chang, Shelley Hsueh-lun (1990). History and Legend: Ideas and Images in the Ming Historical Novels. Ann Arbor: University of Michigan Press. ISBN 047210117X. 279p. Explores the Ming world of fiction and ideas of historical change; the hero; social, political, cosmic order and morality; and reactions to the growth of imperial despotism.
- Hanan, Patrick (1964). "The Development of Fiction and Drama". In Raymond, Dawson (ed.). The Legacy of China. Oxford, England: Oxford University Press. pp. 115–143. Internet Archive free online HERE. A cogent summary, though superseded on some points.
- Hegel, Robert E. (1994). "Traditional Chinese Fiction—the State of the Field". The Journal of Asian Studies. 53 (2): 394–426. doi:10.2307/2059840. JSTOR 2059840. S2CID 163011311.
- —— (1998). Reading Illustrated Fiction in Late Imperial China. Stanford, CA: Stanford University Press. ISBN 0804730024.. This study argues that the decline in quality of printed editions of fiction from late Ming to mid-Qing shows split into popular and literati novels.
- Hsia, Chih-tsing (1968). The Classic Chinese Novel: A Critical Introduction. New York: Columbia University Press. rpr. Bloomington: Indiana University Press, 1980; 413p. ISBN 0253202582); rpr. Shatin: Chinese University Press, 2015 ISBN 978-962-996-763-7) . Internet Archive free online HERE. A key introduction for Western general readers to six novels considered in China to be classics: Three Kingdoms (Sanguozhi yanyi); Water Margin (Shuihu zhuan); Journey to the West (Xiyou ji); Golden Lotus, or Plum in the Golden Vase (Jinpingmei); The Scholars (Rulin waishi); and Story of the Stone (Hongloumeng or Shitou ji)
- Knight, Sabina (2012). Chinese Literature: A Very Short Introduction. Oxford; New York: Oxford University Press. ISBN 9780195392067.
- Li, Wai-yee (2018), "Why Do Classic Chinese Novels Matter?", in Szonyi, Michael; Rudolph, Jennifer (eds.), The China questions: critical insights into a rising power, Cambridge, Mass.; London: Harvard University Press, pp. 252–260, ISBN 978-0-674-97940-6
- Lu Xun, A Brief History of Chinese Fiction. (Foreign Languages Press, tr. 1959 Translated by Gladys Yang and Yang Xianyi. Various Reprints). China's leading early 20th-century writer surveyed traditional fiction in this pioneering survey, based on a series of 1923 lectures, in order to serve as a basis for modern writers. Internet Archive free online HERE
- Plaks, Andrew H. (1987). The Four Masterworks of the Ming Novel: Ssu Ta Ch'i-Shu. Princeton, NJ: Princeton University Press. ISBN 0691067082. Free Internet Archive HERE. A seminal exploration of "literati novels". Romance of the Three Kingdoms, Water Margin (or, Men of the Marshes), Journey to the West, and Golden Lotus (or Plum in a Golden Vase).
- Rolston, David L. & Shuen-fu Lin (1990). How to Read the Chinese Novel. Princeton, NJ: Princeton University Press. ISBN 0691067538. 534 p. Chinese critics of the 17th and 18th centuries wrote commentaries – called dufa ("how to read") – which were interspersed in the text so that the text and the commentary formed one experience for the reader. Scholars in this volume translate and introduce such commentaries for the six now classic novels.
- Ropp, Paul S. (1990). "The Distinctive Art of Chinese Fiction". In Paul S, Ropp (ed.). The Heritage of China: Contemporary Perspectives. Berkeley, CA: University of California Press. pp. 308–334. ISBN 0-520-06441-0. Introductory article summarizing scholarship in the field.
- Sun Chang, Kang-i; Owen, Stephen, eds. (2010). The Cambridge History of Chinese Literature. Vol. II From 1374. Cambridge, UK; New York: Cambridge University Press.
- Wu, Yenna (1999). "Six Classic Chinese Novels". In Schellinger, Paul (ed.). Encyclopedia of the Novel. Chicago: Fitzroy Dearborn. pp. 1226–1231. ISBN 1579580157.. Three Kingdoms (Sanguozhi yanyi); Water Margin (Shuihu zhuan); Journey to the West (Xiyou ji); Golden Lotus, or Plum in the Golden Vase (Jinpingmei); The Scholars (Rulin waishi); and Story of the Stone (Hongloumeng or Shitou ji).
- —— (2013). Ming-Qing Fiction. Oxford Online Bibliographies (Chinese Studies). Oxford University Press. Annotated bibliography of books and articles in Western languages and Chinese (subscription required).
