= Clement Egerton =

British travel writer, translator of Golden Lotus

Frederic Clement Christie Egerton (c. 1890 – ??) was an early and mid-twentieth century British travel and adventure writer best known for his The Golden Lotus (1939), a four-volume translation of the Chinese novel, Jin Ping Mei.

After an early career in religious and educational work, Egerton served in the World War One British army, fighting in the Balkans. Upon his return, he spent a brief time in teaching, but his interest in anthropolological and social theory led him to study the Chinese language in order to better understand a civilization that was of equal but different development. This commitment led him to translate Jin Ping Mei a 17th century erotic classic Chinese novel, which appeared until 1939 as The Golden Lotus. Egerton's interest in languages and cultures led him to French Cameroon in search of a "wild place". He concluded that the French administration of the colony had not improved the lot of the common people. He also established long-standing ties in Portugal, leading to a favorable 1943 biography of the Portuguese dictator Antonio Salazar, and a 1973 book on the achievements of Portuguese colonialism in Angola.

== Career and publications ==
Clement Egerton's father was an English country parson, though there is no mention that Clement attended university. It was later said he had no religious beliefs, but his early life in fact was involved with the church. In 1909 he published A Handbook of Church Music: A Practical Guide for All Those Having the Charge of Schools and Choirs, and Others Who Desire to Restore Plainsong to Its Proper Place in the Services of the Church. Egerton's introduction said that as a Catholic he followed the direction of Pope Pius X, who had made clear that Catholic churches must not use masses of the sort written by Franz Haydn, Mozart and the like. The Gregorian chant, rather, was the only chant inherited from the ancient fathers. Egerton's book was to teach how "plainsong" should be taught and sung. He in 1911 converted to the schismatic Old Catholic Church, which did not recognize the powers of the Pope, and was ordained Bishop of Norwich. He then joined a Dutch Benedictine monastery, however, and petitioned to be reconciled with the Holy See and he did not serve as a minister.

Egerton's 1914 book, The Future of Education, blamed the "traditionalism of the schools and the conservatism of the teacher" for the "neo-disciplinary theory of education that put more emphasis on the process of learning rather than the content". ("Neo-disciplinary education was associated with the progressive education of John Dewey.) It was unfortunate that religion was considered "bad form" in the schools, Egerton went on, for "there is no better safeguard than common sense religion", but the boys generally associated religion with hypocrisy. He drew particular attention to the question of sex and to the Freudian theory that sexual nature develops in various ways and is involved in all parts of the individual's being. Since sexual energy could also be used for religious, aesthetic, and economic ends, sex education was therefore the responsibility of parents and teachers. British boarding schools were dangerous. Co-education would be far more healthy, as single-sex schools repress individuality and encourage "indecent practices".

From 1914 to 1920, Egerton served with the Gloucestershire Regiment, fighting in the Balkans in World War One, He rose from Captain to the rank of Lieutenant Colonel, earned a medal for his service. and was discharged, with a generous pension.

He then returned to England and worked at the Oxford Tutorial College, a university preparatory school. He and his wife, Elizabeth Harker, with whom he had eloped before the war, had four children. He soon met an American, Katherine Hodge, fell in love, and his marriage with Harker ended in divorce. The scandal cost him his job.

At that point, Egerton later explained, his interest in anthropological theory grew. Curious to learn about a developed civilization that was not European, he decided to study Chinese. The School of Oriental and African Studies awarded him the Gilchrist Scholarship for 1925-1926. In 1927 he met the Chinese author C.C. Shu, later famous under his pen-name Lao She, who was teaching at the school. Their friendship burgeoned, and the two worked out an arrangement to share a flat, which they did for the next three years. Shu took responsibility for the rent, while Egerton, who did not find employment during the entire time, looked after the meals. He spent money freely on books, tobacco, and drink, interests that Lao She shared. It was in these years that Egerton and Lao She made the draft translation of Jin Ping Mei.

In 1937, Egerton lived for six months in French Cameroon, which was then a French colony, and wrote about it in his book African Majesty: A Record of Refuge at the Court of the King of Bangantse in the French Cameroons (New York: Scribners, 1939). The anthropologist Melville J. Herskovits welcomed the book for its acceptance of African culture but recommended that the author seek training in anthropology. In the book Edgerton referred to himself as "a disguised philosopher of the 'laissez-everything' school" (p. 90) "I thought I needed a purge; that, if I went to some wild place, I should be forced for a time to live as Nature evidently expected us to live. (p. xvi) Lived in the king's compound, which gave him little idea of how ordinary people lived. Herskovitz concluded that Egerton felt the French administration and that the missionaries' impact had been maligned.

The Time Magazine review reported that the book portrayed King N'jiké as a great stabilizing force. Egerton wondered if the colonial government was simply pretending to educate people for self-government: "They governed themselves before we went there." A native, Egerton thought, might characterize the European achievements as roads he "does not care twopence about", schools which produce "a very disgruntled specimen", missions so frail "that, ten years after the departure of the last missionary, there would be no Christianity left", hospitals whose staffs need "all their time to counteract the tendency of the population to decrease under the white man's rule."

== The Golden Lotus ==
Egerton worked on the translation for the three years he and C.C. Shu shared a London flat. He dedicated the book "To my friend -- Shu Ch'ing Ch'un" (not Lao She, his pen-name). The Translator's Note went on that "without the unstinting and generously given help of Mr. C.C. Shu... I should never have dared to undertake such a task. I shall always be grateful to him." Because the novel had a reputation in China as degenerate pornography, however, Shu did not, perhaps could not, acknowledge that he had played a role.

The Introduction explains that Egerton started work on the translation fifteen years earlier, and ten years earlier had imagined it almost ready for press. His interest had been sparked after the war, when the social applications of a modern school of psychology caught Egerton's attention, and he wanted to see how these applications worked in some other "developed civilization". He took up the study of Chinese in order to explore the Chinese novel, though the choice of Jin Ping Mei was more or less an accident. The choice raised problems, however. The book showed the distinctness of each character by their explicit words and actions, and he felt a translator had no right to mutilate or cut out any of the details of behaviour. He was convinced that the author included them not to titillate the reader but because they showed the shades of character. If he had been an English writer, Egerton went on, he might have avoided these topics or wrapped them in a "mist of words", but he says what he has to say in the "plainest of language". Egerton was determined to leave nothing out, but it could not all go into English: "The reader will therefore be exasperated to find long passages in Latin.... there was nothing else to do."

Egerton acknowledged the help of SOAS sinologist Walter Simon, but C.C. Shu's role has probably been underestimated. Robert Hegel's General Introduction to the 2011 reprint of Egerton's translation comments that "given the complexity of the various voices and the innumerable contemporary references in Jin Ping Mei, it is highly unlikely that a foreigner could translate the text after only a few years of language study, even for a gifted language learner." Shu might have supplied a rough translation, Hegel conjectures, which might explain Egerton's comment that the style of the novel was "telegraphese," which Hegel notes was likely because of Shu's limited English. Hegel points out as evidence that Egerton mistranslated zhuli as "bamboo fans" instead of "bamboo fence". The characters "fan" and "fence" cannot be confused, but a Chinese learner of English like Shu could well pronounce "fans" and "fence" indistinguishably.

Preparing the manuscript for print was tedious and contentious. Egerton's Introduction said that checking details took ten years. The publisher, printer, and copyeditor, disagreed over many of these details, but that the passages in Latin were supplied by a now unknown scholar, not by Egerton himself.

== Critical reactions ==
The Sinologist Lionel Giles compared Egerton's translation into English and Kuhn's translation into German. Egerton, he says, aimed at a "smooth English version without omitting the difficult passages" while also preserving the "spirit of the Chinese," but he left out much.

== Publications ==
=== The Golden Lotus ===
- The Golden Lotus (London: Routledge, 1939).ISBN 9780710073495. 4 vols. This was reprinted in 25 editions. The 1972 Routledge edition was the first to translate the Latin. Free versions of the 1939 publication are online at Internet Archive, HERE
- (2008) Library of Chinese Classics (Beijing) 5 volumes. With the simplified Chinese facing the English translation.
- (2011) The Golden Lotus: Jin Ping Mei (Tokyo; Clarendon, VT: Tuttle ISBN 9780804841702), with a General Introduction by Robert E. Hegel.

=== Other selected works ===
- Egerton, F. Clement C. (1909), A Handbook of Church Music: A Practical Guide for All Those Having the Charge of Schools and Choirs, and Others Who Desire to Restore Plainsong to Its Proper Place in the Services of the Church, London: R. & T. Washbourne. Internet Archive HERE
- ——— (1914), "The Future of Education", Nature, 93 (2336), London: 583, Bibcode:1914Natur..93..583J, doi:10.1038/093583a0 Internet Archive The Future of Education
- ___ , A Minha homenagem a Portugal. 1940. Flora Cardoso Abreu De Oliveira, tr.
- ——— (1943). Salazar, Rebuilder of Portugal. London: Hodder & Stoughton.
- ____, African Majesty: A Record of Refuge at the Court of the King of Bangantse in the French Cameroons (New York: Scribners 1939).
- ___ Angola in Perspective: Endeavour and Achievement in Portuguese West Africa. London: Routledge and Kegan Paul, 1973.
