= 1933 Portuguese constitutional referendum =

- 19 March 1933
- Do you approve the Constitution of the Portuguese Republic?

Results
Choice	Votes	%
Yes	1,292,864	99.52%
No	6,190	0.48%
Valid votes	1,299,054	99.95%
Invalid or blank votes	660	0.05%
Total votes	1,299,714	100.00%
Registered voters/turnout	1,330,258	97.7%
- From: Nohlen & Stöver

A constitutional referendum was held in Portugal on 19 March 1933.

A draft of the new constitution had been published one year before and the public was invited to state any objections in the press. These objections tended to stay in the realm of generalities and there was very little open opposition.

According to a dispatch from the British Embassy in Lisbon, prior to the referendum: "Generally speaking, this novel constitution is receiving the marked approval which it deserves. It has a certain Fascist quality in its theory of 'corporations', which is a reversion to medieval from the 18th-century doctrines. But this quality, unsuited to our Anglo-Saxon tradition, is not out of place in a country which has hitherto founded its democracy on a French philosophy and found it unsuited to the national temperament." The British Embassy also pointed out that Portugal's illiteracy made elections difficult and illusory.

The new constitution was approved by 99.5% of voters, with abstentions counted as "yes" votes. It institutionalised the Estado Novo one party state led by António de Oliveira Salazar, and provided for a directly elected President and National Assembly with a four-year term.

There have been conflicting reports of the results of the referendum. The Diário do Governo of 11 April 1933 reported 1,292,864 Yes; 6,090 No; 660 spoiled; and 30,538 abstentions. Michael Derrick in 1938 and Colonel Clement Egerton in 1943 provided the same numbers, which also appear in Elections in Europe: A data handbook by Nohlen and Stöver.

However, Peter Fryer and Patricia McGowan Pinheiro stated that official figures were 580,376 Yes; 5,406 No; and 11,528 abstentions. Hugh Kay gave in 1970 719,364 Yes; 5,955 No; and 488,840 abstentions, in a registered electorate of 1,214,159, in line with the results published in the Diário de Notícias of 20 March 1933.

Fryer and McGowan Pinheiro stated that the Constitution was railroaded through not letting more than a handful of people vote "no", but they did not explain how the potential "no" voters were restrained. What is quite clear is that abstention numbers were high. Hugh Kay pointed out that abstention might have been because voters were presented with a package deal to which they had to say "yes" or "no" with no opportunity to accept one clause and reject the other.

In this referendum, women were allowed to vote for the first time in Portugal. The new constitution also established women's suffrage in future elections. However, secondary education was a requirement for women to vote, while men needed only to be able to read and write.

== Sources ==
- Kay, Hugh (1970). Salazar and Modern Portugal. New York: Hawthorn Books. LCCN 73-115919.
- "PRESIDENCY OF THE COUNCIL: Minutes of the general assembly for the tabulation of the results of the National Plebiscite" (PDF). Díário Do Governo. 1 (83). Government of Portugal: 649. April 11, 1933.
