= Zhang Zhupo =

Chinese literary critic (1670–1698)

Zhang Zhupo (simplified Chinese: 张竹坡; traditional Chinese: 張竹坡; pinyin: Zhāng Zhúpō; Wade–Giles: Chang Chu-p'o; 1670–1698), courtesy name Zide (Chinese: 自得), also known as Daoshen (Chinese: 道深), was an early Qing dynasty literary critic, commentator, and editor of fiction best known for his commentarial edition of the novel Jin Ping Mei.

== Early life ==
A native of Tongshan, Zhang came from a family with no connections and little detail is known of his life. At the age of 26, bitter at having failed the local examinations five times, Zhang turned to the task of editing and commenting on Jin Ping Mei. He was inspired by the example of the late-Ming dynasty writer and critic Feng Menglong in pursuing publishing and editing as an alternative to an official career, and persuaded by Feng's opinion that Jin Ping Mei was the Diyi Qishu (First Masterpiece).

Zhang died at the age of twenty-nine.

== Influence as an editor and commentator ==
Zhang's Diyi Qishu edition of Jin Ping Mei (1659)

Zhang is grouped with Mao Zonggang and Jin Shengtan as commentators and editors who interpreted novels using a vocabulary and critical standards which up to then had been limited to poetry and painting. This innovation raised the status of fiction for Chinese readers and made the writing of fiction into a respectable activity for educated people. Zhang's 1659 edition of Jin Ping Mei, known as the Diyi Qishu ("First Masterpiece") edition, became the standard and most widely read version of the novel. Like Mao's commentarial edition of Romance of the Three Kingdoms and Jin's of Water Margin, this edition added dufa (讀法 lit. "way to read" or "how to read"). In order to give their work credibility, Mao and Jin claimed to be "transmitting" long-lost editions and did not inform readers that they themselves had extensively rewritten the text or reworked the structure of the novel. Zhang, however, rather than using better texts closer to the author's intention, simply used a text of Jin Ping Mei published during the reign of Chongzhen Emperor (1611–1644), which unfortunately had already been extensively cut and rewritten. Zhang's 1659 edition was something of a bestseller and it was reprinted several times in spite of being placed on the list of pornographic books specifically banned by the Kangxi Emperor. The earlier editions became almost unknown until they were rediscovered in the first part of twentieth century.

Zhang's contribution was not to edit the text but to present a radical interpretation of the novel's technique and intent. He openly said "I created my book, The Plum in the Golden Vase, for myself – why would I have the leisure to write commentary for other people?" Zhang opened his edition with dufa essays which expounded the theory of his interpretation and he inserted comments between chapters, between the lines of the text, and in the upper margins. These comments applied his general theory to specific incidents and details and drew the reader's attention to overall patterns.

Zhang argued that the novel deserved "close reading":

These hundred chapters were not written in a day, but were conceived on particular days at particular times. If you try to imagine how the author conceived of this wealth of individually planned episodes, you will come to realize how much planning, interweaving, and tailoring was required.

Zhang compared the novel to a fabric into which the author had woven themes and worked out a sophisticated and perhaps strained explication of the novel's themes and structure, sometimes word by word. Zhang called the cosmological ideas of cold and heat the “golden key” to the novel. Each detail was related, including the names of each of the characters, the season of the year in which actions took place, colors, foods, plants, and animals. Taken as a whole, says a modern critic, Zhang's edition is “perhaps the most comprehensive and systematic study of the novel before modern times.”

The erotic scenes drew condemnation from many readers. Zhang replied that those who regard Jin Ping Mei as pornographic "read only the pornographic passages." He used line by line explication to detail the novel's moral stance. Zhang asserted that beneath the erotic descriptions and immoral behavior was a moral foundation based on the philosophy of the classic philosopher Xunzi. In contrast to the optimistic view of human nature of Confucius and Mencius, Xunzi saw human nature as evil, or at least immoral, unless restrained by law and uplifted by moral education. Yet Zhang's commentaries did not present the novel as involving sin and punishment, but as a circle of karmic retribution in which bad beginnings led to bad ends. Therefore, he did not see the book as obscene but claimed the "highest morality" for it. As one recent critic puts it, the "dirt" which Zhang saw in the book was not the sexual transgressions but the "ethical abjections," which were intended to form a moral fable. The reader of Jin Ping Mei, warned Zhang in his dufa, "should keep a spittoon handy in order to have something to bang on... a sword ready to hand so that he can hack about him to relieve his indignation... and hang a bright mirror in front of himself so that he can see himself fully revealed."

In spite of the popularity of his edition, Zhang's interpretation did not carry the day in the following centuries. The ban in the reign of the Kangxi Emperor assumed that book was simply pornographic. Critics in the New Culture Movement in the early twentieth century saw the novels as expressions of popular culture, not sophisticated allegories, and rejected the dufa interpretations. They agreed with the Kangxi Emperor that Jin Ping Mei was pornographic. But late twentieth century scholars took a new view founded on the older one. Andrew H. Plaks extolled Zhang's insights and interpretations, and the translator of Jin Ping Mei, David T. Roy endorsed Zhang's view that "the number one marvelous book is not an obscene book." Roy, while preferring the more complete text of the earlier edition for his translation, says that he "stands on the shoulders" of Zhang, especially his view of the moral basis of the seemingly immoral tale.

== Writings ==
- —— (1659). 第一奇書: 金瓶梅 (Di yi qishu Jin Ping Mei). Gaohe cao tang 臯鶴草堂. HathiTrust
- —— (1990), "How to Read Jinpingmei", in Rolston, David (ed.), How to Read the Chinese Novel, Princeton, NJ: Princeton University Press, pp. 196–243
- ---, "How to Read Jin Ping Mei" (translated by David T. Roy) Renditions 24 (1985)

== References and further reading ==
- Ding, Naifei "Tears of Ressentiment; or, Zhang Zhupo's Jin Ping Mei," positions 3.3 (December 21, 1995): 663–694.
- —— (2002). Obscene Things: The Sexual Politics in Jin Ping Mei. Durham: Duke University Press. ISBN 0822329018.
- Gu, Ming Dong (2005). Chinese Theories of Reading and Writing: A Route to Hermeneutics and Open Poetics. Albany: State University of New York Press. ISBN 0791464237. Archived from the original on 2023-11-27.
- Plaks, Andrew H. (1987). "Chin Ping Mei: Inversion of Self-cultivation". The Four Masterworks of the Ming Novel: Ssu Ta Ch'i-Shu. Princeton, N.J.: Princeton University Press. pp. 55–180. ISBN 0691067082..
- Roy, David T. (1977), "Chang Chu-p'o's Commentary on the Chin P'ing Mei", in Plaks, Andrew (ed.), Chinese Narrative: Critical and Theoretical Essays, Princeton, NJ: Princeton University Press
- —— (2006). The Plum in the Golden Vase. Vol. (Volume I). Princeton, N.J.: Princeton University Press. ISBN 0691125341.
- Wang, Rumei 王汝梅 (1999). Jin Shengtan, Mao Zonggang, Zhang Zhupo 金圣叹·毛宗岗·张竹坡 . Shenyang: Chunfeng wenyi chubanshe. ISBN 7531320290.
- ---, "王汝梅解读 金瓶梅," (Wang Rumei decodes Jinpingmei) 时代文艺出版社 Excerpts Sina.com
- Wu, Gan 吴敢. . (1987). 金瓶梅评点家张竹坡年谱 Jin Ping Mei Ping Dian Jia Zhang Zhupo Nian Pu [Chronological biography of Zhang Zhupo, annotator of Jin Ping Mei. Shenyang: Liaoning ren min chu ban she : Liaoning sheng xin hua shu dian fa xing. Archived from the original on 2023-11-27.
