= Xingshi Yinyuan Zhuan =

Novel by Xizhou Sheng

Xǐngshì Yīnyuán Zhuàn
- Cover of Xingshi Yinyuan Zhuan, collection of the Zhejiang University
- Author: Xizhou Sheng (西周生 "Scholar of the Western Zhou"; anonymous)
- Original title: 醒世姻緣傳
- Language: Chinese
- Genre: novel of manners
- Published: 17th-century
- Publication place: China

The Xingshi Yinyuan Zhuan (Chinese: 醒世姻緣傳; pinyin: Xǐngshì Yīnyuán Zhuàn; lit. 'The Story of a Marital Fate to Awaken the World'), also translated as Marriage Destinies to Awaken the World, The Bonds of Matrimony, A Marriage to Awaken the World and A Romance to Awaken the World, is a Chinese classic novel of the late Ming or early Qing dynasty. Consist of 100 chapters and over one million words, it was one of the longest Chinese novels of the period. Scholar Daria Berg calls it "one of China's most underrated traditional vernacular novels" and "one of the most grand-scale explorations of the world in fiction", a saga of two families, one a reincarnation of the other, whose "catalog of vices and moral decay conjures up the apocalyptic vision of a doomed nation".

Originally named E Yinyuan (惡姻緣, A Cursed Marital Fate), the novel takes the Buddhist doctrine of karma and vipāka as its basic motif.

== Authorship and text ==
The novel was published under the pen name Xizhou Sheng (西周生), that is, "Scholar of the Western Zhou" (the Zhou dynasty's Golden Age). Hu Shih's confident announcement in 1931 of his discovery that it was written by Pu Songling has been "largely discredited". Nothing about the author is known, though authorship has been "wrongly" attributed to Pu on the grounds that the novel contains many phrases from the Shandong dialect, as does Jin Ping Mei (indeed Jin Ping Mei is quoted in the novel).

The date of composition lies between 1628 and 1681, placing it either in the late Ming or early Qing dynasty. It shares structural features and techniques with the Four Classic Ming Novels, such as the 100-chapter paradigmatic length, which is broken down into ten-chapter units, often punctuated with climactic or prophetic episodes in the ninth and tenth chapters. Other shared features are the careful use of prefiguring and recurrence, use of the devices of oral literature, and highly expressive colloquial style. The author uses crude sexual and scatological expressions, but the scenes of actual sex are comparatively restrained ("As for what transpired after the lamp was blown out, you can use your imagination – there's no need to go into details").

== Plot ==
Inside the pages of a printed edition (volume one) from the Harvard-Yenching Library

The plot is split between the two incarnations of a married couple. The victim of earlier wickedness will seek retribution by being a tormenting wife in the later reincarnation. In the first, set in the Han dynasty, the lascivious actions of Chao Yuan dissipate his family fortune in reckless living and tortures his father and wife until he is murdered. Retribution for his actions is visited upon his reincarnation, Di Xichen, in the early Ming dynasty, who after failing as a scholar becomes a prosperous merchant and is tormented by two shrewish wives, Sujie and Jijie. Xichen suffers for Chao Yuan's crimes. In the final chapters, Xichen is saved from certain death by a monk. He then vows to abstain from killing, chants the Diamond Sutra, and leads a virtuous life with one of his wives until he dies at the age of 85.

The author paints this serious family drama against a satirical panorama not only of officials, scholars, and teachers, for whom he has little respect, but cooks, midwives, and doctors. All provide examples of lechery, drunkenness, and love of money, yet each of the characters is given individual personality and particular language. The author makes precise use of proverbs, xiehouyu, and curses in the Shandong style, but also literary poetry, fiction, and writings. One of the author’s techniques is to pair one character against another of the same profession or type. Xichen is made to seem all the more inept, for instance, in contrast to his capable assistant, and his wives all the more ill-tempered in contrast with better women.

== Moral teachings ==
The intricate plot and didactic structure are centered on the Buddhist themes of rebirth, karmic retribution, and compassion but also on Confucian precepts of morality, hierarchy, and duty in society. By setting the action in the early Ming, between the 1440s and the 1490s, a time which seemed almost utopian, the author can dramatize the following breakdown of social order, with Heaven sending a destructive flood as a warning. The gross violation of Confucian concepts of propriety applies not only to the relations between man and wife, or between children and their parents and teachers, but is also extended to the other phases of the "five cardinal relationships" as well. The disorder in the family is linked to the Tumu Crisis of 1449, an actual historical incident in which Mongols captured the Emperor. The inversion of proper principles in the family echoes the proverbial "muddleheaded sovereign" (hun-zhun) of a dynasty going to ruin.

Yet Xichen's final awakening also leaves the reader room for hope. In the second plot, ostensibly set in the early Ming dynasty, the author is especially concerned with transgressions against social hierarchy, whether within marriage, such as the wife dominating the husband, or in society at large, such as transgression of social class boundaries, and presents the literate elite as weak and selfish.

== Reputation and evaluations ==
Cover of a copy of the novel from the National Library of China (volume one)

The novel received relatively little serious critical attention in China until the campaign for Vernacular Chinese during the May Fourth Movement in the early 20th century. Hu Shih and Xu Zhimo hailed its verbal vigor and vaunted its graphic descriptions of contemporary social life as a source-book for the study of popular culture, social, economic, and institutional history of its time. Hu Shih complained, however, that the book "is about a million words in length. Throughout these million words on a most unhappy marriage, no one seemed to think of resorting to divorce as a solution", for "Chinese religion, morals, and social usage all conspired to make divorce impossible". Literary studies of the novel in China did not become frequent until the 1980s, when scholarly editions appeared both in Taiwan and on the mainland.

The novel also received much more Western critical appraisal in the 21st century. The novel was described by Kenneth J. Hammond as "an important work of literary and intellectual history". The Journal of the American Oriental Society hailed it as "one of the masterworks of traditional Chinese fiction".
