= Laments in the Temple Case =

1661 protest against the Qing dynasty

- Part of Three Great Cases of Jiangnan
- A Brief Account of the Lament in the Temple Case
- Native name: 哭庙案
- Date: 1661
- Location: Wu County, Suzhou, Qing dynasty
- Participants: Jin Shengtan, Gu Yuxian
- Outcome: 18 executed. Consolidation of Qing authority in Jiangnan.

Laments in the Temple Case (simplified Chinese: 哭庙案; traditional Chinese: 哭廟案; pingyin: kūmiào àn) refers to a protest that took place in the 18th year of the Shunzhi reign (1661) during the Qing dynasty, and to the government's subsequent crackdown on the demonstrators. The writer Jin Shengtan took part in the incident and died as a result. The case dealt a heavy blow to the scholar-gentry of Jiangnan. This incident happened when Jiangnan faced heavy financial pressure and strict tax collection. The immediate cause was harsh tax demands by officials in Wu County and claims that they stole public grain, which angered both local elites and common people. The Laments in the Temple Case is categorized as one of the “Three Great Cases of Jiangnan” (江南三大案) in the early Qing dynasty, alongside the Jiangnan Tax Clearance Case (奏销案) and Tonghai Case (通海案).

== Laments in Chinese Tradition ==
In Chinese tradition, weeping (哭, kū) is not merely a natural expression of private emotion. Weeping and wailing performances was a formal behavior that express grief over death or misfortune in Chinese culture. Due to the fact that this performances involved physical suffering with or without vocalization, protesters sometimes lament in public to obtain the attention from the publics and officials. In Chinese history, "weeping" often entailed more than the mere shedding of tears; rather, it constituted a form of "mourning"(哀哭, aī kū) or "wailing"(号哭, hào kū) governed by specific norms regarding vocalization, gestures, context, and social status. Such expressions could manifest not only within the setting of funeral rites but also in public contexts such as offering remonstrance, seeking redress for grievances, or staging protests. Within the tradition of ritual norms, mourning is particularly closely intertwined with funeral rites. As different kin have distinct modes of lamentation at various stages, mourning thus serves as a ritualistic means of externalizing and publicly manifesting inner grief.

At the same time, lamentation may extend beyond the confines of funeral rites, evolving into a public moral indictment or a form of social protest. Research indicates that public lamentation is sometimes employed to expose injustices within the family, and at other times, to transform private experiences of victimization into public events. Particularly during the late Ming and early Qing periods, "temple weeping" gradually evolved into a form of protest imbued with political significance: participants would publicly wail—either within the Confucian Temple or in its vicinity—sometimes even tearing their robes and headwear or striking bells and drums(钟鼓, zhōng gǔ) to attract onlookers, thereby endowing the act with the specific connotation of publicly condemning official misconduct. Given that Confucian Temples—specifically the Temple of Confucius and the Temple of Literature—hold profound moral symbolic significance within traditional political culture, the act of wailing within these spaces often transforms "grief" into "indictment." Research has explicitly demonstrated that during the late Ming dynasty, the practice of "wailing at the temple" was employed by groups such as Imperial College students and lower-degree holders to protest against corrupt officials; this practice persisted into the early Qing dynasty, serving as a means for local literati to voice their grievances, mobilize public opinion, and exert political pressure.

== Laments in the Temple Case ==
The "Temple Weeping Case" refers to a demonstration that took place in Suzhou in the 18th year of the Shunzhi reign (1661) of the Qing Dynasty—staged in the form of collective mourning at the Confucian Temple—as well as the subsequent severe crackdown launched by the Qing court against the participants. In the 17th year of Shunzhi (1660), the newly appointed magistrate of Wu County, Ren Weichu, abused the “Official Collection and Civilian Settlement” (官收民兑) system to embezzle “more than three thousand shi” of public grain (approximately 212.4 tons), and used corporal punishment on ordinary people who could not hand over the public grain. As a result, the elders of the county, as well as women and children, all felt aggrieved; and scholars such as Ni Yongbin launched the Laments in the Temple action at the Temple of Confucius.

In the second lunar month of the following year (1661), several xiucai led by Jin Shengtan and sympathetic to the victims’ suffering, seized an opportunity created by the Shunzhi Emperor's death. After the prefectural yamen received the mourning edict and set up a spirit hall, they wrote Jietie(揭貼) and brought the placards to the mourning site to accuse the county officials. and arrested Jin Shengtan in the fourth lunar month. Zhu Guozhi arrested Jin Shengtan, the drafter of the accusation, as the principal offender, charging him with the crime of “shaking people’s hearts and inciting disorder, contrary to the laws of the state”; in the end, eighteen people: Ni Yongbin, Shen Yue, Gu Weiye, Zhang Han, Lai Xianqi, Ding Guansheng, Zhu Shiruo, Zhu Zhangpei, Zhou Jiang, Xu Jie, Ye Qi, Xue Erzhang, Yao Gang, Ding Ziwei, Jin Shengtan, Wang Zhongru, Tang Yaozhi, and Feng Zhi were sentenced to death and were executed at Sanshan Street in Nanjing on the thirteenth day of the seventh lunar month. Scholars generally regard the "Temple Weeping Case" as one of the pivotal events in the early Qing dynasty, through which the imperial court cracked down on the local gentry in the Jiangnan region, suppressed local public opinion, and consolidated state authority. It not only demonstrated the potency of "temple weeping" as a form of political protest but also revealed the early Qing regime's extreme sensitivity toward the practice of utilizing ritual spaces to launch public grievances.

== Post-Incident Commemoration ==
While eighteen people were executed, the case also affected local gentry figures such as Gu Yuxian. Gu's imprisonment nearly sparked a popular uprising in Suzhou, manifesting the deep sympathy the local populace felt toward the scholars involved in the case. After years of the case, the memory of the victims remained a spiritual support for the Jiangnan elites. During the public funeral of Gu Yuxian in the 6th year of Kangxi (1669), over 234 scholars and commoners gathered, many of whom were close friends of the late Jin Shengtan.

== The Impact of this Case ==
=== Impact on relations between Qing State and Jiangnan Elites ===
This case further damaged the already strained relationship between the Qing government and the Jiangnan scholar-gentry in the early Qing period. Facing mounting financial pressures, Qing officials began shifting away from the more accommodating approach they had adopted after the conquest. Previously, they had used relatively lenient policies and tax reductions to win over Han gentry support, but now they turned to harsher methods of tax collection and control. Later historians often examine the “Laments in the Temple” case alongside the contemporaneous Jiangnan Tax Clearance Case, viewing both as major crackdowns in 1661 against Jiangnan literati, whom the early Qing rulers saw as particularly dangerous.

The case also highlighted the continued social influence of local gentry figures like Gu Yuxian. Gu's imprisonment triggered intense unrest in Suzhou and nearly sparked broader disturbances. In this way, the case did more than just punish individual participants. It significantly widened the political gap between Qing authorities and Jiangnan local elites.

=== Fiscal Enforcement and Local Governance ===
The direct consequences of the "Laments in the Temple Case" were relatively limited. The authorities conducted interrogations of the participants and arrested several people, among whom 18 were executed by beheading. In a broader interpretation, scholars usually examine this case together with the "Reported Appropriation Case" during the same period, believing that both jointly reveal the fiscal governance model of the Qing Dynasty in the Jiangnan region.

Specifically, the central government first suppressed local excessive taxation and local privileges with severe measures (about 13,000 people were dismissed and demoted in the "Reported Appropriation Case", which fell within the scope of punishment in the "Reported Appropriation Case", rather than the sole outcome of the "Laments in the Temple Case") to ensure fiscal revenue and political control.

After achieving the control goal, it then adopted conciliatory measures (such as the exemption and multiple reductions of grain payments for some of the Qing-ruled areas in the third year of Kangxi's reign and multiple reductions of grain payments in Jiangnan) and supplemented with institutional and symbolic measures (such as the prohibition of private tax inscriptions and strengthening of account management) to restore the legitimacy of collection and local order.

Therefore, the impact of the "Laments in the Temple Case" itself lies in it becoming an example to illustrate the early Qing Dynasty's governance logic of "first suppressing then soothing. Concurrent punishment and institutional norms", rather than independently triggering all the listed institutional changes.

=== Historical Memory and Commemoration ===
The memory of this case persisted through Jin Shengtan's lasting fame as a writer and through ongoing local commemorations in the Jiangnan region. The reason this case is remembered to this day lies not merely in the execution itself, but rather in the manner in which it has endured within both literary works and local memory. Jin Shengtan was the most famous of the eighteen men who were executed, and his death became the focal point of how people remembered what happened.

The case also stayed alive in local memory through figures like Gu Yuxian. His imprisonment caused a huge stir in Suzhou and almost led to a wider unrest. When he was released, crowds reportedly gathered throughout the city. After he died in the eighth year of Kangxi's reign (1669), the local elite community kept his memory alive through public ceremonies. Records show that 234 people contributed to memorial offerings in his honor

== External Source ==
"哭廟記略".
