= Jin Ping Mei =

1610 Chinese naturalistic novel

Jin Ping Mei The Plum in the Golden Vase
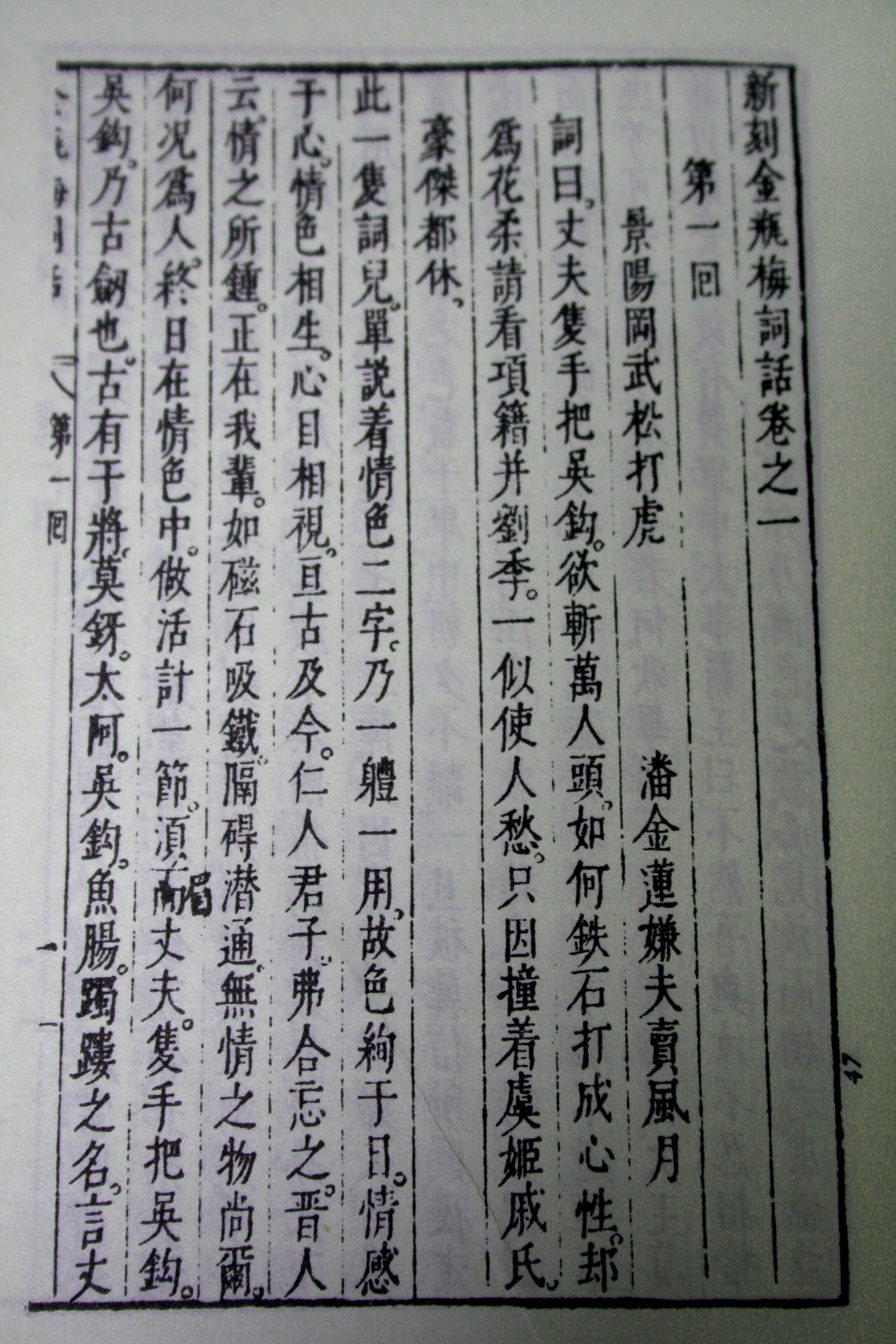
- Wanli era edition
- Author: Lanling Xiaoxiao Sheng ("The Scoffing Scholar of Lanling", pseudonym)
- Original title: 金瓶梅
- Language: Written vernacular Chinese
- Genre: Historical fiction, erotic fiction
- Set in: China, 1111–1127
- Publication date: c. 1610
- Publication place: China (Ming dynasty)
- English publication date: 1972, 2013
- Media type: Print
- Dewey Decimal: 895.1346
- LC Class: PL2698.H73 C4713
- Original text: 金瓶梅 at Chinese Wikisource

Jin Ping Mei
- Chinese: 金瓶梅
- Literal meaning: "The Golden Vase Plum"
Transcriptions
Standard Mandarin
- Hanyu Pinyin: Jīn Píng Méi
- Wade–Giles: Chin^{1} Pʻing^{2} Mei^{2}
- IPA: [tɕín pʰǐŋ měɪ]
Yue: Cantonese
- Yale Romanization: Gām Pìhng Mùih
- Jyutping: Gam^{1} Ping^{4} Mui^{4}
- IPA: [kɐm˥ pʰɪŋ˩ muj˩]

Jin Ping Mei (Chinese: 金瓶梅)—translated into English as The Plum in the Golden Vase or The Golden Lotus—is a Chinese novel of manners composed in vernacular Chinese during the latter half of the 16th century during the late Ming dynasty (1368–1644). Consisting of 100 chapters, it was published under the pseudonym Lanling Xiaoxiao Sheng (蘭陵笑笑生), "The Scoffing Scholar of Lanling," but the only clue to the actual identity is that the author hailed from Lanling County in present-day Shandong. The novel circulated in manuscript as early as 1596, and may have undergone revision up to its first printed edition in 1610. The most widely read recension, edited and published with commentaries by Zhang Zhupo in 1695, deleted or rewrote passages to help understand the author's intentions.

The explicit depiction of sexuality garnered the novel a notoriety akin to Lady Chatterley's Lover and Lolita in the West, but critics such as the translator David Tod Roy see a “firm moral structure” which “exacts retribution for the sexual libertinism of the central characters”.

Jin Ping Mei takes its name from the three central female characters—Pan Jinlian (潘金蓮, whose given name means "Golden Lotus"); Li Ping'er (李瓶兒, literally "Little Vase"), a concubine of Ximen Qing; and Pang Chunmei (龐春梅, "Spring plum blossoms"), a young maid who rose to power within the family. Chinese critics see each of the three Chinese characters in the title as symbolizing an aspect of human nature, such as mei (梅), plum blossoms, being metaphoric for sexuality.

David Tod Roy calls the novel "a landmark in the development of the narrative art form—not only from a specifically Chinese perspective but in a world-historical context ... noted for its surprisingly modern technique" and "with the possible exception of The Tale of Genji (c. 1010) and Don Quixote (1605, 1615), there is no earlier work of prose fiction of equal sophistication in world literature." Jin Ping Mei is considered one of the six classics of Chinese novels.

== Plot ==
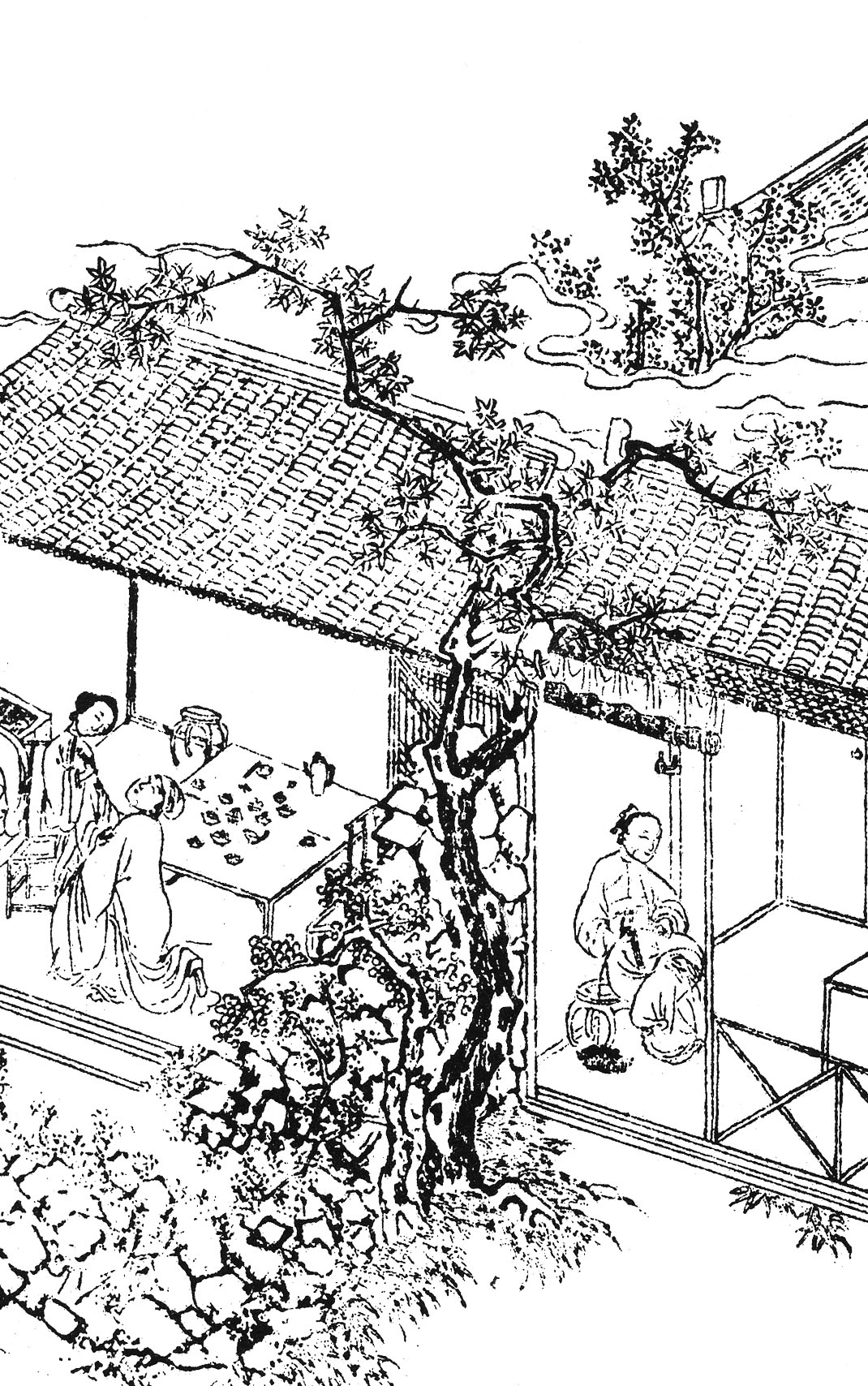
Chapter 4 illustration of Jin Ping Mei

The story, ostensibly set during the years 1111–1127 (during the Northern Song dynasty), centers on Ximen Qing (西門慶), a corrupt social climber and lustful merchant who is wealthy enough to marry six wives and concubines. Jin Ping Mei is framed as a spin-off from Water Margin. The beginning chapter is based on an episode in which "Tiger Slayer" Wu Song avenges the murder of his older brother by brutally killing his brother's former wife and murderer, Pan Jinlian. In Water Margin, Ximen Qing is killed by Wu Song; in Jin Ping Mei, he dies from an overdose of aphrodisiacs administered by Jinlian to keep him aroused. The intervening sections, however, differ in almost every way from Water Margin.

After Pan Jinlian secretly murders her husband, Ximen Qing takes her as his fifth wife. The story follows the domestic and sexual struggles of the women within his household as they clamor for prestige and influence amidst changing fortunes of the family. Ximen has a daughter but no son. Ximen takes a sixth wife, Li Ping'er, who bears him a son, but both Li Ping'er and her son die. Ximen's career continues to advance, marked by a visit to the imperial court. Immediately after his death from the aphrodisiac, Ximen's first wife Wu Yueniang bears him a posthumous son. The last fifth of the novel which follows his death shows the fate of Ximen's household. His daughter's husband Chen Jingji embarks on an affair with Pan Jinlian before she is murdered. One of Ximen's wives remarries well, as does Pan Jinlian's maid Chunmei. Another returns to sex work, and another kills herself. Finally, in the chaos of the Jin invasion, Yeuniang gives up her son, Ximen's heir, to become a monk, and the household is taken over by one of Ximen's longstanding servants.

In the course of the story, Ximen has 19 sexual partners, including his six wives and mistresses, and a male servant. There are 72 detailed sexual episodes in the novel. However, considering Jin Ping Mei has over one million words (and over 3,600 pages in complete English translation), the graphic sexual scenes account for less than 3 percent of its total content.

== Evaluation ==
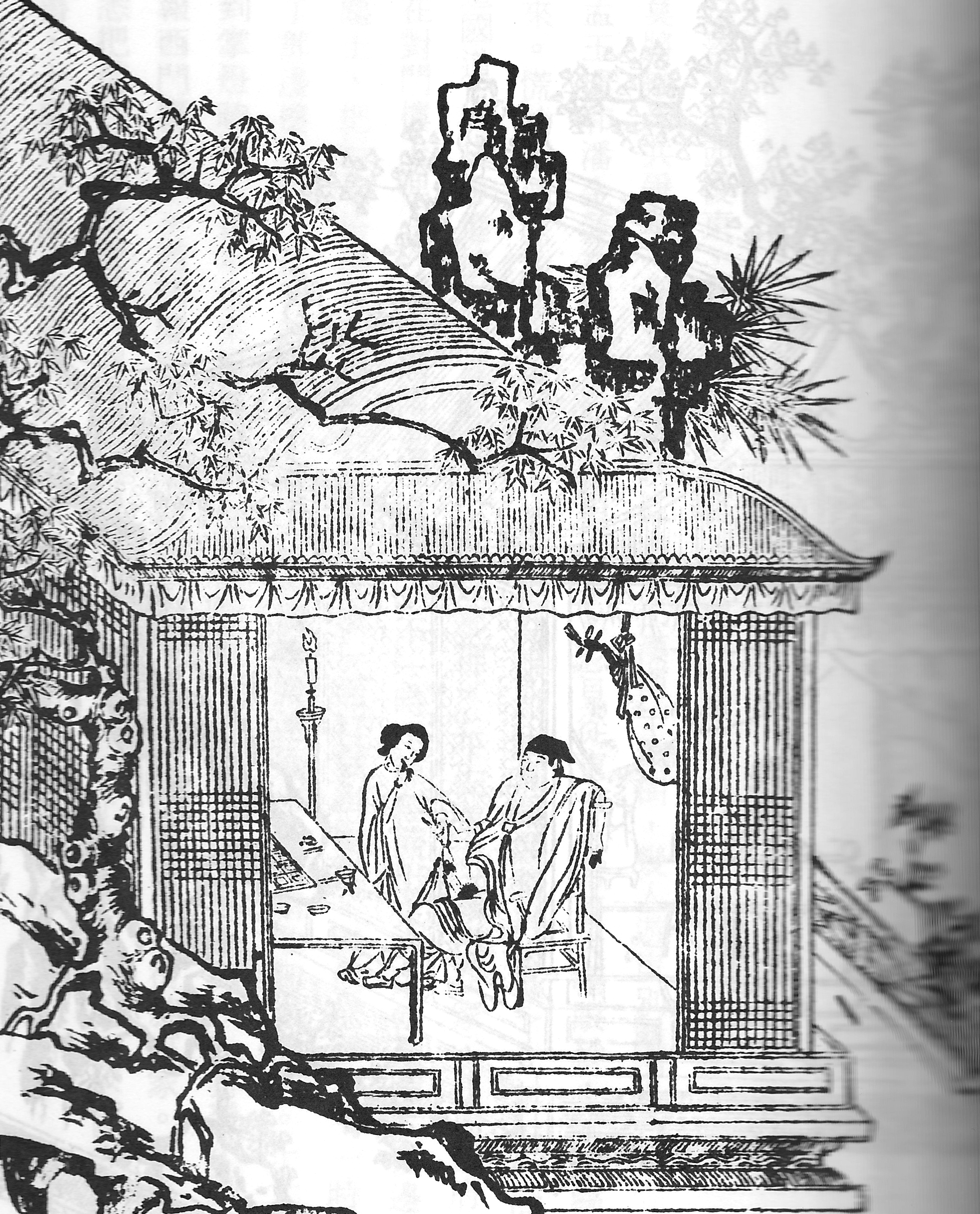
Ximen and Golden Lotus, illustration from 17th-century Chinese edition

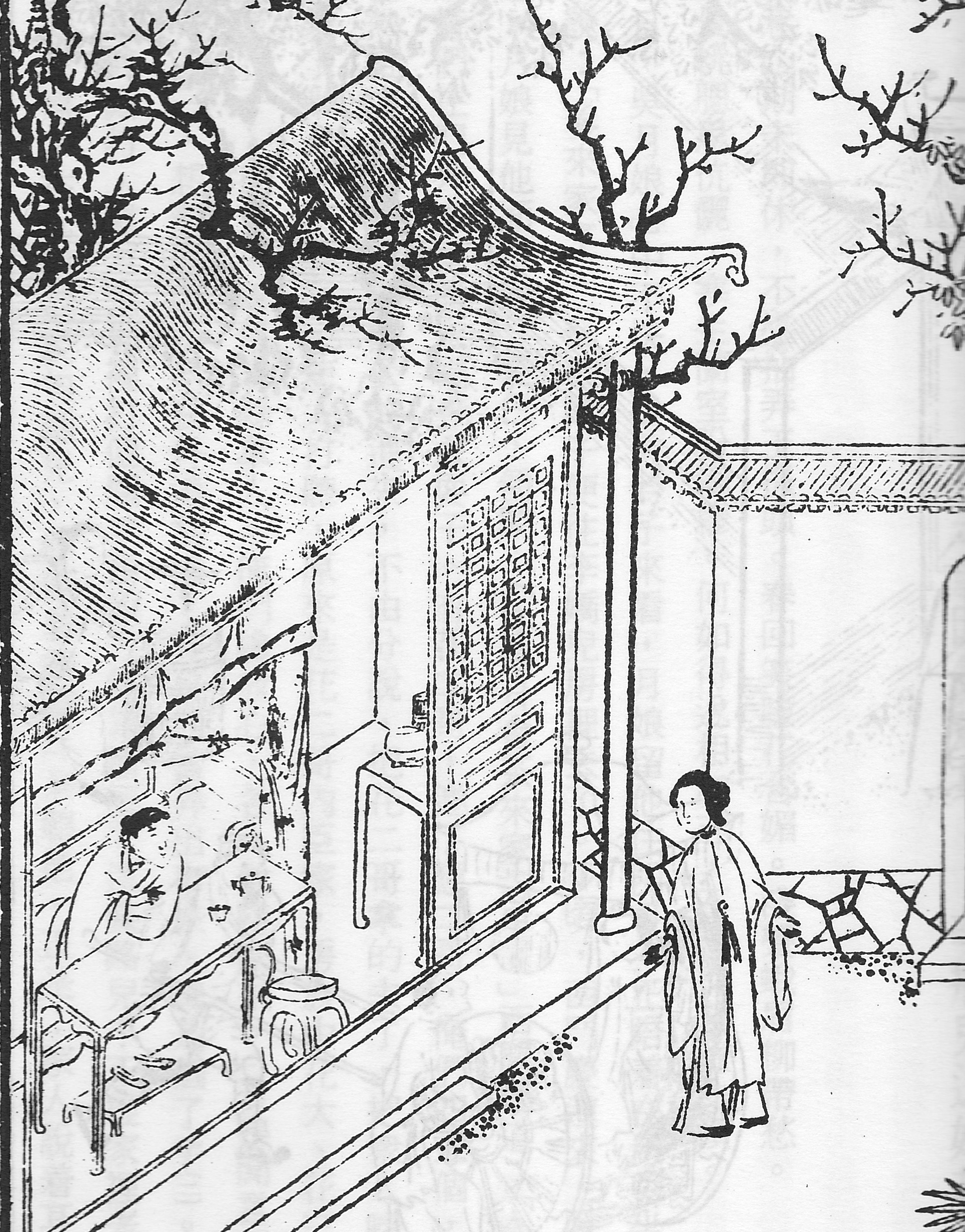
Another illustration of a scene

For centuries identified as pornographic and officially banned most of the time, the book has nevertheless been read surreptitiously by many of the educated class. The early Qing dynasty critic Zhang Zhupo remarked that those who regard Jin Ping Mei as pornographic "read only the pornographic passages." The influential author Lu Xun, writing in the 1920s, called it "the most famous of the novels of manners" of the Ming dynasty, and reported the opinion of the Ming dynasty critic, Yuan Hongdao, that it was "a classic second only to Shui Hu Zhuan." He added that the novel is "in effect a condemnation of the whole ruling class."

The American scholar and literary critic Andrew H. Plaks ranks Jin Ping Mei as one of the "Four Masterworks of the Ming Novel" along with Romance of the Three Kingdoms, Water Margin, and Journey to the West, which collectively constitute a technical breakthrough and reflect new cultural values and intellectual concerns. It has been described as a "milestone" in Chinese fiction for its character development, particularly its complex treatment of female figures. James Robert Hightower wrote in 1953 that along with The Dream of the Red Chamber, it ranks with "the greatest novels" for "scope, subtle delineation of character, and elaborate plot." Phillip S. Y. Sun argued that although in craftsmanship it is a lesser work than The Dream of the Red Chamber, it surpasses the latter in "depth and vigour".

The novel contains a surprising number of descriptions of sexual objects and coital techniques that would be considered fetish today, as well as a large number of bawdy jokes and oblique but titillating sexual euphemisms. Some critics have argued that the highly sexual descriptions are essential, and have exerted what has been termed a "liberating" influence on other Chinese novels that deal with sexuality, most notably the Dream of the Red Chamber. David Tod Roy (whose translation of the novel was published 1993–2013) sees an "uncompromising moral vision," which he associates with the philosophy of Xunzi, who held that human nature is evil and can be redeemed only through moral transformation.

== Authorship ==
The identity of the author has not yet been established, but the coherence of the style and the subtle symmetry of the narrative point to a single author. The British orientalist Arthur Waley, writing before recent research, in his Introduction to the 1942 translation suggested that the strongest candidate as author was Xu Wei, a renowned painter and member of the "realistic" Gong'an school of letters, urging that a comparison could be made of the poems in the Jin Ping Mei to the poetic production of Xu Wei, but left this task to future scholars.

The "morphing" of the author from Xu Wei to Wang Shizhen would be explained by the practice of attributing "a popular work of literature to some well-known writer of the period". Other proposed candidates include Li Kaixian and Tang Xianzu. In 2011, Zhejiang University scholar Xu Yongming argued that Bai Yue was possibly the author.

The novel contains extensive quotations and appropriations of the writings of other authors. According to The Cambridge History of Chinese Literature, Jin Ping Mei's sources include vernacular stories, pornography, histories, dramas, popular songs, jokes, and prosimetric narratives, as well as texts far outside of the parameters of the literary, such as official gazettes, contracts, and menus."

== Translations ==
=== English ===
==== 1610 version ====
- Roy, David Tod (1993–2013). The Plum in the Golden Vase. Princeton, N.J.: Princeton University Press. ISBN 0691125341. A complete and annotated translation of the 1610 edition presumed to be closest to the author's intention.
1. Volume One: The Gathering (1993)
2. Volume Two: The Rivals (2001)
3. Volume Three: The Aphrodisiac (2006)
4. Volume Four: The Climax (2011)
5. Volume Five: The Dissolution (2013)

==== 1628-44 Chongzhen version ====
Abridged

1. Clement Egerton. The Golden Lotus (London: Routledge, 1939).ISBN 9780710073495. 4 vols. Internet Archive, HERE. Various reprints. Egerton worked with the celebrated Chinese novelist Lao She, who because of the nature of the novel refused to claim credit for its English version. It was an "expurgated", though complete, translation of the 1695 edition, with the more explicit parts rendered in Latin. Later editions translate the Latin. Republished in 2008, as part of the Library of Chinese Classics, in 5 volumes as the book is in a mirror format with the simplified Chinese facing the English translation.
2. Bernard Miall, translated from the German of Franz Kuhn with an Introduction by Arthur Waley. Chin P'ing Mei: The Adventurous History of Hsi Men and His Six Wives. (London: John Lane, 1942; reprint: New York, Putnam, 1947).

Unabridged

- The Edgerton translation was reprinted with the Wade-Giles transliterations replaced with pinyin and the Latin passages translated, as The Golden Lotus: Jin Ping Mei (Tuttle Classics) Clarendon, VT: Tuttle, 2011 ISBN 9780804841702) with a General Introduction by Robert E. Hegel

==== 1695 version ====
- Only the introduction How to Read Ch'in P'ing Mei has been translated but the full commentary of Zhang Zhupo has not been translated into English yet.

=== Other languages ===
- The book was translated into Manchu as ᡤᡳᠨ
  ᡦᡳᠩ
  ᠮᡝᡳ
  ᠪᡳᡨᡥᡝ (Wylie: Gin p'ing mei pitghe, Möllendorff: Gin ping mei bithe) and published in a bilingual edition as early as 1708. The title is a phonetic transcription of each syllable in the Manchu script, rather than a translation of the meaning. It has been digitized by the Documentation and Information Center for Chinese Studies of Kyoto University and is available online.
- La merveilleuse histoire de Hsi Men avec ses six femmes. Translated by Jean-Pierre Porret. (Paris: Le Club Français du Livre, 1949–1952, reprinted, 1967). 2 volumes.
- Djin Ping Meh: Schlehenblüten in Goldener Vase: ein Sittenroman aus der Ming-Zeit, translated by Otto and Artur Kibat. 6 volumes. (Hamburg: Die Waage, 1967–1983). Uses the 1695 recension.
- Fleur en fiole d'or, Jin Ping Mei Cihua. Translated and annotated by André Lévy. La Pléiade Gallimard 1985. Folio Gallimard 2004. 2 volumes ISBN 2-07-031490-1. The first translation into a Western language to use the 1610 edition, but follows the 1695 edition in omitting many of the longer song suites and other borrowed material.
- Jin Ping Mei en verso y en prosa. Complete Spanish translation. Translated and annotated by Alicia Relinque Eleta. Atalanta. 2 volumes (2010, 2011). ISBN 978-84-937784-7-7
- Complete Russian translation, 5 volumes, 1994–2016: Цзинь, Пин, Мэй, или Цветы сливы в золотой вазе. Volumes 1–3: Irkutsk: Ulysses Publishing, 1994, 448+512+544 pages. ISBN 5-86149-004-X. Volume 4, books 1–2: Moscow: Institute of Oriental Studies of the Russian Academy of Sciences, 2016, 640+616 pages. ISBN 978-5-89282-698-3, 978-5-89282-697-6

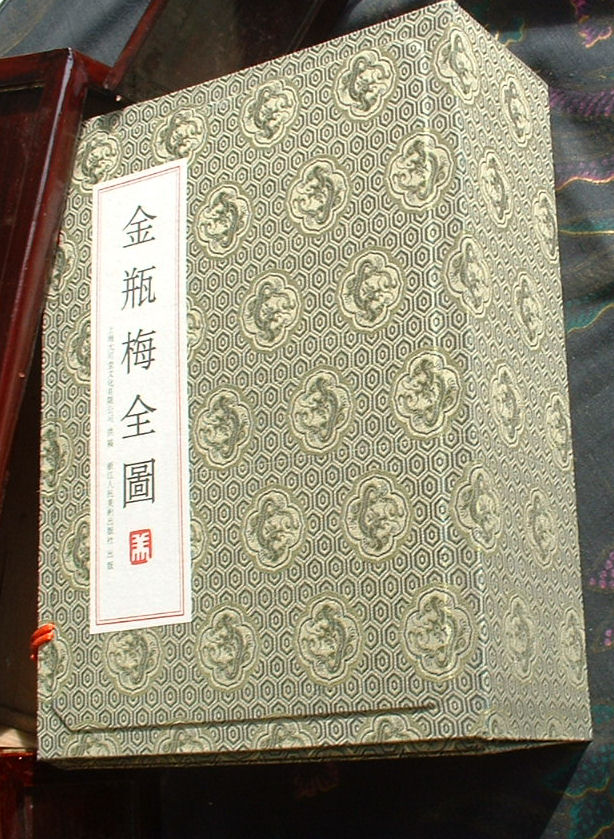
A Chinese edition of the novel

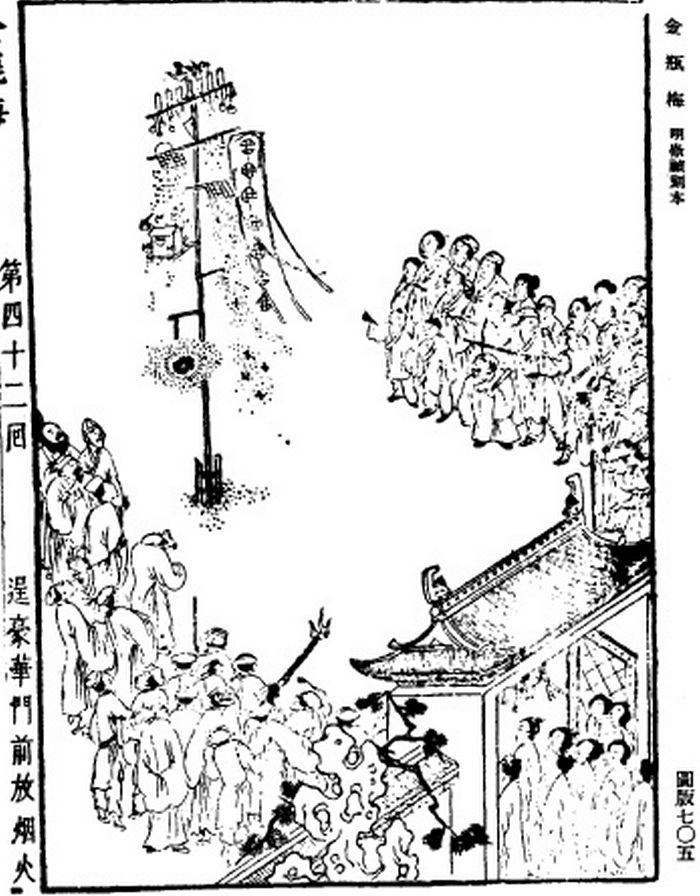
An illustration of a fireworks display from a 1628–1643 edition of Jin Ping Mei from the Ming era.

Another edition of Jin Ping Mei from the late Ming era

Title page of the novel from a printed edition

== Adaptations ==
- The Concubines (Japan, 1968)
- The Golden Lotus (Hong Kong, 1974)
- Ban Geum-ryeon (South Korea, 1982)
- Gentle Reflections zh:恨鎖金瓶 (Hong Kong, 1994)
- The graphic novelist Magnus created a truncated graphic novel loosely based on the Jin Ping Mei, entitled the 110 Sexpills which focused on the sexual exploits and eventual downfall of Ximen Qing (albeit with the surname being taken as the character's given name, and vice versa).
- The Japanese manga by Mizukami Shin 金瓶梅・奇伝 炎のくちづけ (Kinpeibai Kinden Honoo no Kuchizuke) is loosely based on Jin Ping Mei. (2004)
- The Forbidden Legend Sex & Chopsticks (Hong Kong, 2008)
- Golden Lotus (musical; premiered in 2014)

== References and further reading ==
- Hegel, Robert E. (2011), "General Introduction", The Golden Lotus: Jin Ping Mei, vol. I, Tokyo; Brattleboro, Vt.: Tuttle, pp. 5–21, ISBN 9780804841702
- C. T. Hsia, Ch. V "Chin Ping Mei", in The Classic Chinese Novel: A Critical Introduction. (1968; rpr. Ithaca, N.Y.: East Asia Program, Cornell University, Cornell East Asia Series, 1996). ISBN 1885445741.
- Li, Wai-Yee (2001), "Full-Length Vernacular Fiction", in Mair, Victor (ed.), Columbia History of Chinese Literature, New York: Columbia University Press, pp. 620–658, ISBN 0231109849 esp. pp. 639–643.
- Lu, Hsun (2000) [First published 1923]. A Brief History of Chinese Fiction. Translated, Gladys Yang, Yang Xianyi, Foreign Languages Press, 1959; reprinted: University Press of the Pacific, 2000. ISBN 0-89875-154-3.
- Andrew H. Plaks. The Four Masterworks of the Ming Novel: Ssu Ta Ch'i-Shu. (Princeton, N.J.: Princeton University Press, 1987). ISBN 0691067082.
- Qi, Lintao (17 December 2019). Jin Ping Mei English Translations Texts, Paratexts and Contexts. Taylor & Francis. ISBN 9780367892975.
- Roy, David Tod (2006), "Introduction", The Plum in the Golden Vase, or, Chin P'ing Mei Vol I The Gathering, Princeton, N.J.: Princeton University Press, pp. xvii–xlvii, ISBN 0691069328
- Schonebaum, Andrew, ed. (2022). Approaches to Teaching the Plum in the Golden Vase (The Golden Lotus). New York: Modern Languages Association. ISBN 9781603295444. Essays.
- Song, Chundan; Xie, Ying (January 2017). "More Than Sex". NewsChina. Vol. 101. pp. 52–55.
- Spence, Jonathan (1994). "Remembrance of Ming's Past". The New York Review of Books. 23.; archived at NYRB China Archive "Remembrance of Ming's Past".
