= Shi Nai'an =

Chinese writer (c. 1296 – c. 1372)

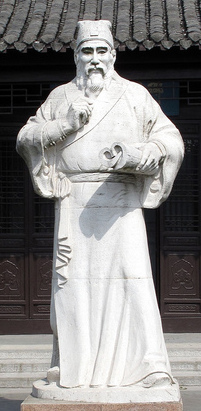
- Born: c. 1296
- Died: c. 1372
- Occupation: Writer
- Writing career
- Language: Chinese

Shi Nai'an (Chinese: 施耐庵; pinyin: Shī Nài'ān, c. 1296–1372) was a Chinese writer from the Yuan and early Ming periods. Shuihu zhuan (Water Margin), one of the Four Great Classical Novels of Chinese literature, is traditionally attributed to him.

== Biography ==
Little is known about Shi. Traditionally, it was believed that he was a teacher of Luo Guanzhong, the editor or author of Romance of the Three Kingdoms, another of the Four Great Classical Novels. The recent Chinese scholar Ge Liangyan writes that little is known about Luo, and about Shi even less. Late Ming and early Qing scholars claimed that Shi lived near the end of the Yuan dynasty and that he was a native of Hangzhou, but they may have been echoing each other or citing the conjectures that they did not endorse. The early 20th century scholar Lu Xun thought that the name "Shi Nai'an" might have been invented by composers of a later edition of the novel.

Shortly after World War II, a memorial tablet bearing Shi's name was found in Xinghua county, Jiangsu, and in the early 1950s a team of researches was sent to investigate. The chief investigator declared "Not even the faintest vestige of Shi Nai'an was found to be there." Evidence in a family genealogy seemed to affirm his identity, but it is not clear that the genealogy was authentic. Ge Liangyan concludes that the debate over the existence of Shi will "never lead to a conclusive end." He adds that in any case, we will not be able to determine whether either Luo or Shi, if they existed, were involved with the compilation of Water Margin.

Nor has the attempt by the eminent drama expert Wu Mei (吳梅) and others to identify Shi Nai'an as Shi Hui (施惠) gained much of a following. Dai Bufan denies that Shi Nai'an ever existed, explaining that his persistently cited name may be a pseudonym for an anonymous compiler working under the patronage of Guo Xun (郭勛).

The Shi Nai'an Literary Prize is named in his honour.
