= Mao Zonggang =

Chinese literary scholar (1632–1709)

Mao Zonggang (simplified Chinese: 毛宗岗; traditional Chinese: 毛宗崗; pinyin: Máo Zōnggāng 1632–1709; courtesy name Xushi 序始; art name Zian 子庵), and his father, Mao Lun (simplified Chinese: 毛纶; traditional Chinese: 毛綸; pinyin: Máo Lún; courtesy name Shengshan 聲山) were Qing dynasty editors and commentators who influenced the conception of the Chinese novel.

== Influence as editors and commentators ==
The father and son are best known for editing and providing commentaries on the novel Romance of the Three Kingdoms. They are often grouped with Zhang Zhupo and Jin Shengtan as commentator/editors whose dufa (讀法 lit. "way to read") interpreted novels using a vocabulary and critical standards which up to then had been limited to poetry and painting. This innovation raised the status of fiction for Chinese readers and made the writing of fiction into a respectable activity for educated people.

The Maos' substantially revised text, first published in 1679 (1680 in the western calendar), was so successful that it drove earlier versions from the market and for nearly three centuries was the only one which most Chinese readers knew. Their commentaries, or dufa (how to read), explained the moral and historical issues in the novel. These dufa not only shaped reader reactions but also helped to establish fiction as acceptable to serious readers rather than frivolous or even illicit.

Although their edition of Three Kingdoms was published under and is known by Mao Zonggang's name, scholars assume that Mao Lun was primarily responsible. Little is known of Mao Lun, though it is understood that he went blind as he entered middle age and relied on his son as his secretary. Mao Lun experienced the Manchu conquest of the lower Yangzi valley in the 1640s and saw friends executed for being loyal to the Ming. Scholars have long debated whether his viewpoint was that of a loyalist who supported Southern Ming remnants, in which case his sympathies might lie with the loyalist group in Three Kingdoms.

== Editing the Romance of the Three Kingdoms ==
In the 1660s, during the reign of the Kangxi Emperor, Mao Lun and Mao Zonggang edited and significantly altered the text of Ming dynasty editions of the Sanguozhi Tongsu Yanyi novel (三國志通俗演義), organizing it into 120 chapters, and abbreviating the title to Sanguozhi Yanyi (三國志演義). They reduced the text from 900,000 to 750,000 characters; cut and supplemented to improve narrative flow; reduced the use of third party poems; replaced conventional verse with finer pieces; and removed most passages praising Cao Cao's advisers and generals. Mao Lun did not explain these editorial changes to his readers but claimed that the earlier "vulgar edition" (suben 俗本) had corrupted the original text. Mao claimed to have found an "ancient edition" (guben 古本) which embodied the author's true wishes.

The scholar Andrew West concludes that "there is hardly a line that has not been affected to some degree by Mao Lun's surgical knife." Many of these textual changes, West continues, are "insidious in intent, for they quietly realign the reader's interpretation of the central protagonists." That is, there is a question whether readers are to view Liu Bei as legitimate because he was descended from the ruling family of the Han dynasty, though now head of only the Shu state, or whether Cao Cao, leader of the usurping state of Wei, had a greater claim to legitimacy because he was more forceful and competent. Although the earlier text acknowledges the legitimacy of Liu's state of Shu over Cao's state of Wei, the attitude towards Cao Cao is often ambivalent. Mao Lun, on the other hand, is "unequivocal in his praise for Liu Bei and his condemnation for Cao Cao."

"The empire long divided must unite," long understood to be Luo's introduction and philosophy, was actually added by Mao Zonggang and Mao Lun in their substantially revised edition of 1679. None of the earlier editions contained this phrase. The earlier editions, moreover, spend far more time on the bitter process of reunification and the struggles of the heroes who sacrificed for it.

After the draft of their Sanguozhi Yanyi was completed in the early 1660s, Mao Lun planned to hand off the manuscript to someone from Nanjing to publish it, but at that point one of Mao Lun's students tried to pass the work as his own. The publication was put on hold because of this, and the first extant Mao edition of the Sanguozhi Yanyi was prefaced 1679, perhaps reflecting the delay that was caused.

== Editing the Tale of the Pipa ==
In the years between the completion of their recension of the Sanguozhi Yanyi to its publication, Mao Lun and Mao Zonggang provided commentary to another work, the Ming play Tale of the Pipa by Gao Ming. In the preface of their edition of the Tale of the Pipa, Mao Lun explained that he had the idea to do a commentary on the play since adolescence, but not until he went blind did he have the leisure to turn that idea into reality. Like what they did for Sanguozhi Yanyi, the Maos present their edition of Tale of the Pipa as a recovered old text, not their own interpretation. In this regard they closely mirror the methodology of their contemporary Jin Shengtan, the commentator of Water Margin and Romance of the Western Chamber. However, unlike Jin's morally subversive commentary, the Maos tend to affirm conventional morality.

The Maos interpret the Tale of the Pipa as Gao Ming's vehicle to criticize an acquaintance. This interpretation is noted to be a common one for their time, but not one based on objective evidence. Consequently, the Mao commentary to the Tale of the Pipa was panned by many of their contemporaries like Li Yu and Zhang Zhupo.

== References and further reading ==
- Besio, Kimberly Ann & Constantine Tung (2007). Three Kingdoms and Chinese Culture. Albany: State University of New York Press. ISBN 978-0791470114.
- Roberts, Moss (1991), "Afterword", in Luo Guanzhong, attributed to (ed.), Three Kingdoms, Berkeley: University of California Press
- Luo, Guanzhong and translated from the Chinese with afterword and notes by Moss Roberts (1991). Three Kingdoms: A Historical Novel. Berkeley; Beijing: University of California Press; Foreign Languages Press. ISBN 0520068211.
- Rolston, David L. (1990). How to read the Chinese novel. Princeton, N.J.: Princeton University Press. ISBN 0691067538.
- Wang, Rumei 王汝梅 (1999). Jin Shengtan, Mao Zonggang, Zhang Zhupo 金圣叹·毛宗岗·张竹坡. Shenyang: Chunfeng wenyi chubanshe. ISBN 7531320290.
- West, Andrew. The Textual History of Sanguo Yanyi The Mao Zonggang Recension, based on the author's "Quest for the Urtext: The Textual Archaeology of The Three Kingdoms" (PhD Dissertation, Princeton University, 1993), and his 三國演義版本考 Sanguo Yanyi Banben Kao [Study of the Editions of The Romance of the Three Kingdoms] (Shanghai: Shanghai Guji Chubanshe).
