= A Brief History of Chinese Fiction =

1930 book by Lu Xun

- 1959 Translation
- Author: Lu Xun
- Original title: 中国小说史略
- Translator: Gladys Yang, Yang Xianyi
- Series: China Knowledge Series
- Subject: Chinese fiction
- Published: 1923-24; 1925; revised, 1930

A Brief History of Chinese Fiction
- Traditional Chinese: 中國小說史略
- Simplified Chinese: 中国小说史略
Transcriptions
Standard Mandarin
- Hanyu Pinyin: Zhōngguó xiǎoshuō shǐlüè
- Wade–Giles: Chung^{1}-kuo^{2} hsiao^{3}-shuo^{1} shih^{3}-lüeh^{4}
- IPA: [ʈʂʊ́ŋkʰwǒ ɕjàʊʂwó ʂɻ̩̀.lɥê]

A Brief History of Chinese Fiction (Chinese: 中国小说史略; pinyin: Zhōngguó xiǎoshuō shǐlüè) is a book written by Lu Xun as a survey of traditional Chinese fiction. It was first published in Chinese in 1925, revised in 1930, translated into Japanese, Korean, German, and then into English in 1959 by Gladys Yang and Yang Xianyi. It was the first in-depth survey of Chinese fiction to be published in China, and has been influential in shaping later scholarship.

The coverage extends from early myths and legends through the zhiguai stories of the Six Dynasties, the chuanqi stories of the Tang and Song dynasties, the vernacular stories of the following dynasties, and late Qing novels. The scholar John C. Y. Wang finds the study is still "significant and enduring" in providing a strong interpretive framework and detailed presentations of many previously neglected works, but also that it has obvious shortcomings, such as overemphasis on early forms of fiction, not enough coverage of later forms, such as the bianwen and vernacular short stories.

== History ==
In 1920 Peking University invited Lu Xun to give a course on the history of Chinese literature. A draft version based on his lecture notes was issued in two parts in 1923 and 1924, then in a combined volume in 1925, which was reprinted five times. Lu Xun revised it for publication in 1930. The work was quickly translated into Japanese, then over the following decades into Japanese again, then into English, German, and Korean. WorldCat, the international catalog, lists 175 editions in Chinese and Japanese published from 1925 to 2012 and 54 editions in English from 1959 to 2014.

== Evaluations ==
Robert Hegel in state-of-the-field review of scholarship on Chinese fiction, notes that Lu Xun had "far less than the complete corpus of classical Chinese fiction" available to him, and there were many items to which he did not have access. Two dominant genres of the Tang, the bianwen and pinghua, he continues, had only begun to be rediscovered and few readers understood their historical significance. Hegel concludes that Lu Xun's critical insights into individual works remain useful, but Brief History, "while still thought-provoking, is far from sufficient as an introduction to the field now, seventy years later."

John C.Y. Wang praises Brief History for being both "grand in design and minute in execution". Later discovery of new materials meant there are gaps to be filled and conclusions to be revised, but "a bold outline had been drawn and a sound methodology established...." Before Brief History, there was little discussion of fiction in Chinese studies of literature; for extensive discussion of genres and works of fiction, one had to turn to foreign works such as Herbert Giles’s History of Chinese Literature or a survey in Japanese by Sionoya On Lu Xun’s approach balanced presentation of historical context, the work's audience, the work's author, and the work itself. The solid scholarship is all the more impressive because earlier neglect of the subject made it difficult to establish authorship, text, and dating. The Chinese version includes references to the primary and secondary sources, which are not included in the English translation.

== Debates and contributions to the field ==
Because of its persuasive interpretation and clear presentation, Brief History is still the starting point even for many scholars who do not agree with it.

For instance, Professor Gu Ming Dong writes that a "scholarly consensus" at the time holds that Chinese fiction reached “full maturity” only in the Tang dynasty, for "Lu Xun’s view has been generally considered authoritative." The argument in Brief History is that the pre-Tang stories were "unconsciously composed fictional works" (fei youyi zuo xiaoshuo) while the Tang chuanqi tales were "consciously composed fiction" (youyi wei xiaoshuo). Gu points out that Lu Xun's distinction grew from one made by Hu Yinglin, a literary theorist in the Qing dynasty, who stressed "authorial intention". Professor Gu points out that authorial intention is difficult to establish and that authors may have tried to hide it. He goes on to take Lu Xun to task for underestimating pre-Tang fiction writers who recognized the need for factuality but wanted to take advantage of their powers of fictitious creativity. The zhiguai tales of the Six Dynasties may have been scraps left over when the standard histories were written.

There has been disagreement on other points. Wilt Idema, for instance, was among the first to disagree with Lu Xun's explanation that the huaben of the Song dynasty were "promptbooks," or at least printed versions of them, used by professional storytellers, (Brief History Ch 12–13) rather than stories which consciously adopt the conventions and rhetoric of storytellers in order to achieve certain effects.

Later scholars adopted Lu Xun's term shenmo xiaoshuo (神魔小说) in Brief History, which has three chapters on the genre. The literary historian Mei Chun translates Lu Xun's term as "supernatural/ fantastic." The Yangs translate it as "gods and demons literature." .

== Contents ==
Preface

1. The Historians' Accounts and Evaluations of Fiction

2. Myths and Legends

3. Works of Fiction Mentioned in "The Han Dynasty History"

4. Fiction Attributed to Han Dynasty Writers

5. Tales of the Supernatural in the Six Dynasties

6. Tales of the Supernatural in the Six Dynasties (Continued)

7. Social Talk and Other Works

8. The Tang Dynasty Prose Romances

9. The Tang Dynasty Prose Romances (Continued)

10. Collections of Tang Dynasty Tales

11. Supernatural Tales and Prose Romances in the Sung Dynasty

12. Story-Tellers' Prompt-Books of the Sung Dynasty

13. Imitations of Prompt-Books in the Sung and Yuan Dynasties

14. Historical Romances of the Yuan and Ming Dynasties

15. Historical Romances of the Yuan and Ming Dynasties (Continued)

16. Ming Dynasty Novels About Gods and Devils

17. Ming Dynasty Novels About Gods and Devils (Continued)

18. Ming Dynasty Novels About Gods and Devils (Continued)

19. Novels of Manners in the Ming Dynasty

20. Novels of Manners in the Ming Dynasty (Continued)

21. Ming Dynasty Imitations of Sung Stories in the Vernacular

22. Imitations of Classical Tales in the Ching Dynasty

23. Novels of Social Satire in the Ching Dynasty

24. Novels of Manners in the Ching Dynasty

25. Novels of Erudition in the Ching Dynasty

26. Novels About Prostitution in the Ching Dynasty

27. Novels of Adventure and Detection in the Ching Dynasty

28. Novels of Exposure at the End of the Ching Dynasty

Postscript

Appendices: The Historical Development of Chinese Fiction

== Selected editions and translations ==
- —— (1923). 中国小说史略 Zhongguo Xiaoshuo Shilue. Bei jing: Beita diyi yuan xinchao chu.
- —— (1930). 中国小說史略 Zhongguo Xiao Shuo Shi Lüe. Shanghai: Beixin shuju. First revised edition.
- (Japanese) —— (1935). 支那小說史 Shina ShōSetsushi. Translated by 増田 Wataru Masuda. Tokyo: Sairensha.
- (English)—— (1959). A Brief History of Chinese Fiction. Translated by Glady Yang; Yang Hsienyi. Foreign Languages Press. ISBN 9780898751543. Internet Archive Free Online
- (Korean) —— (1978). 中國小說史略 Chungguk SosŏL Saryak. Translated by Pom-jin Chong. Soul: Pomhak Toso.
- (German) —— (1981). Kurze Geschichte Der Chinesischen Dichtung. Beijing: Verlag für fremdsprachige Literatur.
- (Vietnamese): —— (1996). Sơ Lược Lịch Sử Tiẻ̂u Thuyé̂t Trung Quó̂c. Translated by Duy Tâm Lương. [Hà Noi]: Van hóa.
