= David Tod Roy =

American sinologist and scholar

David Tod Roy (simplified Chinese: 芮效卫; traditional Chinese: 芮效衛; pinyin: Ruì Xiàowèi; 1933 – May 31, 2016) was an American sinologist and scholar of Chinese literature who was Professor of East Asian Languages and Civilizations at the University of Chicago from 1967 until he took early retirement in 1999. Roy is most well-known for his translation of Jin Ping Mei (The Plum in the Golden Vase, or, Chin P’ing Mei), published in five volumes by Princeton University Press from 1993 to 2013. It stands alongside the Four Great Novels of the Ming dynasty. Where earlier translations omitted many passages, especially the sexual ones, Roy was the first to render the whole novel into English.

== Early life ==
Roy's parents were Presbyterian missionaries to China, where his father, Andrew Tod Roy, taught at Nanking University. David and his younger brother, J. Stapleton Roy, were born in Nanjing. The Roys were on furlough in the United States when the Second Sino-Japanese War broke out, and, when they returned to China, the family moved with the university to Chengdu, Sichuan. The brothers did not have formal schooling, but their father taught them poetry and were tutored in other subjects by faculty from local universities between 1939 and 1945.

After the war, Roy attended the Shanghai American School but, as the Communist Revolution came closer to power, other students withdrew until Roy was among only 16 students left. He took his final exam in tenth-grade geometry the day the communist army marched into the city. His parents were firm that their mission required them to communicate their faith in all circumstances and decided to stay on. Their mother arranged for the boys to be tutored in Chinese by a traditional scholar, Zhao Yanan, who had helped Pearl S. Buck to translate The Water Margin. The brothers developed their spoken Chinese as well. Roy later told an interviewer that he then made the "fatal mistake" or "wonderful choice" of asking Zhao to write the Chinese characters for his name; he stayed up half the night practicing it.

In the summer of 1950, Roy returned to the United States and lived with his aunt, Jean Roy Robertson, and uncle in Merion, outside Philadelphia. He entered Friends' Central School there, although Derk Bodde, a sinologist at the University of Pennsylvania, also accepted him into his graduate seminar in classical Chinese, where Roy was the only student. Bodde recommended that Roy apply to Harvard, one of the few North American universities with a Chinese program. Roy entered but failed German, and did not attend other classes. He was asked to leave, then joined the United States Army during the Korean War. While in the Army he was stationed in Japan and Taiwan, where he improved his Chinese even further by deciphering the handwritten notes of his Chinese colleagues.

He returned to Harvard to finish his undergraduate degree and went on to graduate work in Chinese studies. In 1958 he was made a member of Harvard's prestigious Society of Fellows. He was assistant professor for several years at Princeton University, despite not yet having finished his doctoral thesis, a study of the modern Chinese poet and literary figure Guo Moruo. Professor Fairbank, at Princeton to give a talk, visited David in his office, spied the manuscript on his desk, took it in hand, and while leaving, congratulated David on having completed his Ph.D. degree. The thesis was the basis for his first book, Kuo Mo-Jo: The Early Years published by Harvard University Press in 1971.

== Translating Jin Ping Mei ==
Roy's interest in Jin Ping Mei began when he was still in China. He recalled that, as a teenage boy, he was attracted by its reputation of being pornographic, but "when I tried to read it I discovered there was much more to it than that." He did not focus on the novel as a specialty, however, until he joined the faculty of the University of Chicago in 1967. He initiated a graduate seminar on the novel without intending to do a translation. The example of his colleague Anthony Yu, who did a complete translation of the later novel, Journey to the West, eventually inspired him to begin the translation in 1982, which would end up being thirty years' work, only finishing in 2012.

Roy's graduate seminar on the novel took two years to read through the entire 3,000 pages of the earliest edition. He and his students saw that the novel contained abundant but unidentified quotations from earlier works. Roy spent several years making an index for every line of poetry, proverb, or drama in the text, filling more than 10,000 three-by-five file cards. He then set out to read all of the works that were in print before the novel was compiled; this index allowed him to identify a great number of the quotations and allusions that earlier scholars had not known.

The translation was warmly greeted upon its publication. Jonathan Spence, reviewing the first volume of the translation for the New York Review of Books in 1994, remarked on "the splendid energy with which David Tod Roy ... has translated this vast and remarkable novel". Roy's policy as a translator, Spence observed, was to “translate everything—even puns,” and to include all traditional “formulaic” material, such as proverbs, stock couplets, and such, and that it will be the first translation to render the whole novel into English. Roy has made a "major contribution to our overall understanding of the novel by so structuring every single page of his translation that the numerous levels of the narration are clearly differentiated" and has annotated the text with a precision, thoroughness, and passion for detail that makes even a veteran reader of monographs smile with a kind of quiet disbelief". His glosses and annotations combine "the quarter century he tells us he has worked on the novel with the labors of the centuries of Chinese commentators and exegetes who came before him—all of whom he seems to have read—and the dedicated researches and doctorates of his own accomplished students at the University of Chicago (whose contributions are fully acknowledged)".

The scholar Perry Link, reviewing the last volume to appear (also in the New York Review of Books), wrote that "Roy can point to a life’s work of enviable concreteness: 3,493 pages, five volumes, and 13.5 pounds, the world’s only translation of 'everything,' as he puts it, in a huge and heterogeneous novel that has crucial importance in Chinese literary tradition."

Link added that Roy may have overestimated the novel. When Roy defends it "by calling it a 'work in progress,' he recalls for me G. K. Chesterton’s insight that 'if a thing is worth doing, it is worth doing badly'. The first airplane didn’t soar, either, but it’s very good that someone got a prototype off the ground.... What does it matter if the author of Chin P’ing Mei might be less than Flaubert? Why should anyone have to feel defensive?"

== Personal life ==
David Roy married Barbara Chew in 1967, while he was teaching at Princeton.

He was diagnosed with ALS (more commonly known as Lou Gehrig's disease) just as he had finished the translation of Jin Ping Mei in 2012. Roy died in Chicago on May 30, 2016.

== Major publications ==
- The Plum in the Golden Vase (Princeton, N.J.: Princeton University Press, 1993–2013, 5 vols. Vol 2)
- Ancient China: Studies in Early Civilization (Hong Kong: Chinese University Press, 1978, with Tsien Tsuen-hsuin, eds.)
- Kuo Mo-Jo: The Early Years (Cambridge, MA: Harvard University Press; Harvard East Asian Series, 55, 1971)
