= Andrew H. Plaks =

American sinologist

Andrew Henry Plaks (Chinese: 浦安迪; pinyin: Pǔ Āndí; born 1945) is an American sinologist who specializes in the study of the vernacular fiction of the Ming and Qing dynasties. From 1973 to 2007, he taught at Princeton University, becoming full professor in 1980. He moved to the Hebrew University of Jerusalem in 2007, where he became Professor of East Asian Studies.

In 1968, he married Livia Basch (1947–2013), and they had two sons, Jason and Eric.

== Academic career ==
Plaks studied as an undergraduate in the Department of Oriental Studies at Princeton University, graduating summa cum laude with an A.B. in 1967. He stayed on at Princeton University for graduate study in East Asian Studies. He obtained his Ph.D. in 1973 with a dissertation on Archetype and allegory in the Hung-Lou Meng. He was subsequently offered a position in the Department of East Asian Studies at Princeton University, becoming an associate professor in 1976, and a full professor in 1980. Between April–June 2005, he was a Fellow at the Swedish Collegium for Advanced Study in Uppsala, Sweden. In 2007, he retired from Princeton University, and moved to Israel to take up a position at the Hebrew University of Jerusalem, where he became Professor of East Asian Studies.

== Contributions to the field ==
Plaks's 1987 book Four Masterworks of the Ming Novel, which won the Joseph Levenson Book Prize, is an analysis of a group of four Ming dynasty novels which Plaks argues changed the genre: Romance of the Three Kingdoms, Water Margin, Jin Ping Mei, and Journey to the West. Ellen Widmer, writing in the Journal of Asian Studies, says that the book creates "a far-reaching hypothesis about the consolidation of the novel form in China", namely, that the four novels can be taken as a milestone. He identifies a "figural density" and establishes that the key to understanding the novels is the use of irony, by which he means "every possible disjunction between what is said and what is meant." According to Plaks, the novels ask serious questions about sexuality, selfhood, heroism, power, and reality, while offering serious Neo-Confucian answers.

Another literary scholar, Paul Ropp, says that Plaks pays special attention to the 16th century editors, authors, and commentators who played different roles than those in earlier times. He also points out structural differences, such as their "paradigmatic length of one-hundred chapters [with one exception], narrative rhythms based on division into ten-chapter units, further subdivisions into building blocks of three- or four chapter episodes, contrived symmetries between the first and second halves of the texts, special exploitation of opening and closing sections, as well as certain other schemes of spatial and temporal ordering, notably the plotting of events on seasonal or geographical grids". Ropp says that although not everybody may agree with all of Plaks's ideas, he has pioneered the sophisticated criticism of the traditional Chinese novel, and his emphasis on the use of irony in the novels is especially important.

In 2018, the first volume of Dream of the Red Chamber, covering chapters 1–27, was published in Hebrew, translated jointly by Plaks and Amira Katz. This is the first translation of the novel into the Hebrew language. The second volume, covering chapters 28–53, was published in 2021.

== Bibliography ==
- Plaks, Andrew H. (1976). Archetype and Allegory in the Dream of the Red Chamber. Princeton, N.J.: Princeton University Press. ISBN 0691046166.
- —; DeWoskin, Kenneth J. (1977). Chinese Narrative : Critical and Theoretical Essays. Princeton, N.J.: Princeton University Press. ISBN 0691063281.
- — (1978). "Full-Length Hsiao-Shuo and the Western Novel: A Generic Reappraisal" (PDF). New Asia Academic Bulletin. 1: 163–176.
- — (1980). "Shui-Hu Chuan and the Sixteenth-Century Novel Form: An Interpretive Reappraisal". Chinese Literature: Essays, Articles, Reviews. 2 (1): 3–53. doi:10.2307/495478. JSTOR 495478.
- — (1985). "After the Fall: Hsing-Shih Yin-Yüan Chuan and the Seventeenth-Century Chinese Novel". Harvard Journal of Asiatic Studies. 45 (2): 543–580. doi:10.2307/2718972. JSTOR 2718972.
- — (1987). The Four Masterworks of the Ming Novel: Ssu Ta Ch'i-Shu. Princeton, N.J.: Princeton University Press. ISBN 0691067082.
- — (1993). 明代小說四大奇书 (Ming Dai Xiao Shuo Si Da Qi Shu). Translated by 沈亨寿 (Shen Hengshou). Beijing Shi: Zhongguo he ping. ISBN 7800372618. (translation of The Four Masterworks)
- —; Peterson, Willard J.; Yu, Yingshi; Ch'en, Ta-tuan; Mote, Frederick W., eds. (1994). The Power of Culture : Studies in Chinese Cultural History. Hong Kong: Chinese University Press. ISBN 9622015964.
- — (2006), Moretti, Franco (ed.), The Novel in Pre-Modern China, Princeton: Princeton University Press
- — (2003). 紅樓夢批語偏全 (Hong Lou Meng Pi Yu Pian Quan). Beijing: Beijing da xue chu ban she. ISBN 7301059132.
- Zisi (2004). דרך האמצע וקיומה [The Doctrine of the Mean]. Translated by Plaks, Andrew H.; Eber, Irene. Bialik Institute.
- Zengzi. תורת הגדול [Great Learning] (in Hebrew). Translated by Andrew Plaks. Bialik Institute.
- Plaks, Andrew (2007). "Leaving the Garden: Reflections on China's Literary Masterwork". New Left Review. 47.
- Cao Xueqin (2018). חלום המשכנות האדומים [Dream of the Red Chamber] (in Hebrew). Vol. 1. Translated by Andrew Plaks; Amira Katz. Bialik Institute.
- Cao Xueqin (2021). חלום המשכנות האדומים [Dream of the Red Chamber] (in Hebrew). Vol. 2. Translated by Andrew Plaks; Amira Katz. Bialik Institute.
