= Robert E. Hegel =

American sinologist (born 1943)

Robert E. Hegel (born January 9, 1943; Chinese: 何谷理; pinyin: Hé Gǔlǐ) is an American sinologist specializing in the fiction of late imperial China. He taught at Washington University in St. Louis, from 1975 until his retirement in the spring of 2018 and was made Liselotte Dieckman Professor of Comparative Literature and Professor of Chinese in 2006.

In 2000, the Institut de France, Académie des Inscriptions et Belles-Lettres awarded Hegel the Prix Stanislas Julien for Reading Illustrated Fiction in Late Imperial China.

== Early life and education ==
Hegel was born on January 9, 1943, in Goodrich, Michigan. He was inspired by the Soviet launching of the Sputnik rocket in 1957 to study engineering. But once enrolled at Michigan State University, he recalled later, he "discovered fairly quickly that it didn't matter how hard I studied calculus, I just couldn't understand it." Instead, he began to study Chinese, which he found "different, and much more difficult than I had imagined, but it was also fascinating", he said. "Chinese culture was unfamiliar, yet understandable — human interests and needs being pretty much constant around the world, after all."

In 1965, he entered the graduate program at Columbia University using a National Defense Foreign Language fellowship which supported him through coursework and a period of study in Taiwan. At Columbia he studied with C. T. Hsia, who was turning his attention to the classic Chinese novels. In Taiwan, Hegel took a supplementary job for the China Airlines flight magazine, which he credits with getting him outside the library to learn about Chinese culture.

While finishing work on his dissertation, he taught at Case Western Reserve University, Cleveland from 1972 to 1974. At Duke University, Durham, he was Visiting Associate Professor of International Studies in 1986 and Resident Director of the Duke Study in China Program for 1986. He joined the Arts and Sciences at Washington University as Assistant Professor in 1975, and became Full Professor and Chair of the Department of Department of Asian and Near Eastern Languages and Literatures in 1986.

== Scholarly career and reception ==
Hegel's 1981 monograph, The Novel in Seventeenth Century China, analyzes three related seventeenth century works of fiction set in the Sui dynasty, along with other prominent writings, especially the critical writings of Jin Shengtan and Zhang Zhupo. Hegel sets these works of fiction and criticism in their political and cultural background, particularly the decades of turmoil that marked the transition from the Ming to the Qing dynasty. Hegel sees three developments reflected in fiction of this period: interest in contemporary events, a rise of individualism and self-expression, and a new interest in using form to convey character and feeling. These developments, he argues, were similar in some ways to those when Western fiction moved towards realism and psychological awareness. Ellen Widmer's review in Harvard Journal of Asiatic Studies praises the work but adds that a choice of different works to include would lead to different results and that it is a "preliminary foray, the rough first mapping which inspires others to amplify and shade in."

Reading Illustrated Fiction in Late Imperial China (1998) examines changes in the style and aesthetic appeal of how fiction was printed. Ming dynasty novels were printed in much the same form as other publications with a literati audience, showing that fiction was an acceptable form but that under Manchu rule fiction was printed in poorer editions. Literati came to define their identity in contrast to the illiterate masses and fiction as "vulgar". Novelists such as Cao Xueqin and Wu Jingzi did not allow their works to be put into print during their lifetimes, but circulated them in manuscript. Wilt Idema's review in China Information concludes that "Few books are a better introduction to the nature of [Ming and Qing vernacular fiction], and the changing ways of their reception, than Prof. Hegel's fine monograph." The book won the Stanislaus Julliene Award (2000).

True Crimes in Eighteenth Century China (2009) selected and translated original depositions from witnesses and evidence from the accused in capital cases. These were contained in memorials to the emperor written by the county magistrate who conducted the investigation and the trial, since (a death sentence had to be approved by the emperor himself). One reviewer said that "at one level" it is a "fascinating book", showing that the magistrate was scrupulous and energetic in investigating and applying the law and that the depositions conveyed details of daily life. But he objected that Hegel missed points of Qing law. Hegel explained to an interviewer that his interest was also in these depositions as pieces of writing. "However, as products of the same educational system that produced China's novelists and story writers, the magistrates who wrote these reports had a similar sense of careful composition and the ability to make texts mean more than they say. These features of the crime reports are what attracted me." He added that "if we can view the judicial system of late imperial China as a viable attempt to reach goals that we share today, then we can overcome the prejudiced view of early twentieth-century reformers and we can more objectively regard China's past as an important segment of our common human experience."

== Selected publications ==
- Hegel, Robert E. (1980). "(Review) The Journey to the West. Volume II. Translated and Edited by Anthony C. Yu". The Journal of Asian Studies. 39 (2): 340–342. doi:10.2307/2054299. JSTOR 2054299. S2CID 162238634.
- —— (1981). The Novel in Seventeenth-Century China. New York: Columbia University Press. ISBN 978-0231049283.
- —— (1991). "Inventing Li Yu (Review Article)". CLEAR. 13: 95–100.
- —— (1994). "Traditional Chinese Fiction-- The State of the Field". The Journal of Asian Studies. 53 (2): 394–426. doi:10.2307/2059840. JSTOR 2059840. S2CID 163011311.
- —— (1998), "Chinese Novel: Beginnings to the 20th Century", in Schellinger, Paul (ed.), Encyclopedia of the Novel, vol. I, Chicago; London: Fitzroy Dearborn, pp. 205–211
- "The Sights and Sounds of Red Cliffs: On Reading Su Shi," Chinese Literature: Essays, Articles, Reviews (CLEAR) (Volume 20 1998): 11-30.
- —— (1998). Reading Illustrated Fiction in Late Imperial China. Stanford, CA: Stanford University Press. ISBN 978-0804730020.
- —— (2005), "Niche Marketing for Late Imperial Chinese Fiction", in Brokaw, Cynthia Joanne; Kai-wing Chow (eds.), Printing and Book Culture in Late Imperial China, Berkeley: University of California Press, ISBN 978-0520231269
- Hegel, Robert E., ed. (2009), True Crimes in Eighteenth-Century China: Twenty Case Histories, with contributions by Maram Epstein, Mark McNicholas and Joanna Waley-Cohen, Seattle: University of Washington Press, ISBN 9780295989075
- —— (2017). Idle Talk Under the Bean Arbor: A Seventeenth-Century Chinese Collection. edited, and translated with Li Qiancheng, Mei Chun, Lane Harris, Li Fang-yu, Alexander C. Wille, Zhang Jing, Annelise Finegan Wasmoen, Xu Yunjing, and Lindsey Waldrop. Seattle: University of Washington Press.
