= Jin Shengtan =

Chinese writer (c. 1610–1661)

Jin Shengtan (simplified Chinese: 金圣叹; traditional Chinese: 金聖歎; pinyin: Jīn Shèngtàn; Wade–Giles: Chin Shêng-t'an; 1610? – 7 August 1661), original name Jin Renrui (金人瑞), also known as Jin Kui (金喟), was a Chinese editor, writer and critic, who has been called the champion of Vernacular Chinese literature.

== Biography ==
The year of Jin's birth is unclear, with some sources reporting 1610 and others 1608. (Note: For examples of this discrepancy, see: Wu, Yenna (1991). "Repetition in Xingshi yinyuan zhuan". Harvard Journal of Asiatic Studies. 51 (1). Harvard Journal of Asiatic Studies, Vol. 51, No. 1: 55–87. doi:10.2307/2719242. JSTOR 2719242.; Rushton, Peter (1986). "The Daoist's Mirror: Reflections on the Neo-Confucian Reader and the Rhetoric of Jin Ping Mei (in Essays and Articles)". Chinese Literature: Essays, Articles, Reviews. 8 (1/2). Chinese Literature: Essays, Articles, Reviews, Vol. 8, No. 1/2: 63–81. doi:10.2307/495115. JSTOR 495115.) The former estimate is based on the fact that Jin's son was 10 years old in East Asian age reckoning in 1641, and is generally accepted by scholars. He was born Jin Renrui in the town of Suzhou, a place celebrated for its culture and elegance. Jin's family was of the scholar-gentry class, but was constantly plagued by sickness and death, which led in turn to little wealth. Jin's father was apparently a scholar. Jin began schooling relatively late, attending a village school at the age of nine. He displayed great intellectual curiosity, and had somewhat unusual ideas. However, he was a conscientious student. Early in life, he took the style name "Shengtan", a phrase from the Analects meaning "the sage [Confucius] sighed". He passed only the lowest of the imperial examinations, and never held public office.

In his writings, Jin showed a great interest in the ideas of Chan Buddhism. He claimed that this interest began early, when he first read the Lotus Sutra at the age of 11. This inclination toward Buddhist ideas became even more pronounced after the fall of the Ming dynasty in 1644. In that year and the one that followed, Jin became conspicuously more depressed and withdrawn, as well as more receptive to Buddhism. The 20th century scholar Zhang Guoguang attributed this change to the fall of the short-lived Li Zicheng regime. Throughout his life, Jin's interest in Buddhism affected his views, and he considered himself a mere agent of the forces of eternity.

Jin is sometimes said to have been known by the name Zhang Cai (張采), but this appears to be a mistake due to confusion with a contemporary, Zhang Pu.

=== Death ===
In 1661, Jin joined a group of literati protesting the appointment of a corrupt official. The protesters first petitioned the government, and then staged a public rally. This was met with swift retaliation from local officials, and Jin was sentenced to death. This incident is sometimes called "Lamenting at the Temple of Confucius" (哭廟案), and led to a stifling of political dissent for years after. Before his death, Jin supposedly joked, "Being beheaded is the most painful thing, but for some reason it's going to happen to me. Fancy that!" In a 1933 essay, noted writer Lu Xun admits that this quote may be apocryphal, but condemns it as "laughing away the cruelty of the human butcher".

== Literary theory and criticism ==
He was known for formulating a list of what he called the "Six Works of Genius": the Zhuangzi, the poem Li Sao, Shiji, Du Fu's poems, Romance of the Western Chamber, and the Water Margin. This list contained both highly classical works, like Li Sao and Du Fu's poems, and novels or plays in vernacular Chinese that had their origins in the streets and marketplace. The six works were chosen based on their literary merit, as opposed to their upstanding morals. For these reasons, Jin was considered an eccentric and made many enemies among the conservative Confucian scholars of his day. Jin edited, commented on, and added introductions and interlinear notes to the popular novels the Water Margin and Romance of the Three Kingdoms, and the Yuan dynasty drama, Romance of the Western Chamber.

Jin is often grouped with Mao Zonggang, and Zhang Zhupo as commentator/editors. Mao's commentarial edition of Romance of the Three Kingdoms and Zhang's commentary on The Plum in the Golden Vase featured dufa (讀法; 'way to read') which interpreted the novels using a vocabulary and critical standards which up to then had been limited to poetry and painting. This innovation raised the status of fiction for Chinese readers and made the writing of fiction into a respectable activity for educated people.

Jin believed that only the emperor and wise sages could truly "author" a work. He points out that even Confucius took pains to avoid being named the author of the Spring and Autumn Annals. In Jin's view, the authoring of books by commoners would lead to the undermining of heavenly order and peace. He saw his commentary as the only way to minimize the damage caused by books "authored" by those who were unworthy to do so. In writing his commentaries, Jin firmly believed that the story that was written should be read on its own terms, apart from reality. In his commentary on Romance of the Western Chamber, he wrote, "the meaning lies in the writing, and does not lie in the event". In other words, it is the story that is written that matters, rather than how well that story emulates reality. At the same time, Jin believed that authorial intention is less important than the commentator's reading of a story. In his Romance of the Western Chamber commentary, he writes, "Xixiang Ji is not a work written by an individual named Wang Shifu alone; If I read it carefully, it will also be a work of my own creation, because all the words in Xixiang Ji happen to be the words that I want to say and that I want to write down".

== Major works ==
=== Commentary on the Water Margin ===
Jin's first major critical activity, completed in 1641, was a commentary on the popular Chinese novel the Water Margin. The commentary begins with three prefaces, in which Jin discusses his reasons for undertaking the commentary, and the achievements of the work's putative author Shi Nai'an. The next section is entitled "How to Read the Fifth Work of Genius". In addition to advice for the reader, this section contains Jin's thoughts on the literary achievements of the novel as a whole. The novel itself comes next, with introductory marks preceding each chapter, and critical comments inserted frequently between passages, sentences, and even words of the text.

Jin's version of the Water Margin is most well known for the drastic alterations that he makes to the text. Earlier versions of the text are 100- or 120-chapter in length. Jin deletes a large portion of the story, from the second half of chapter 71 to the end of the novel. In order to bring the modified text to a conclusion, he composes an episode in which Lu Junyi has a vision of the execution of the band, and amends this to the second half of chapter 71. Jin also combines the Prologue of earlier editions with the first chapter, creating a new, single chapter titled "Induction". This forces the renumbering of all subsequent chapters, so Jin's version of the Water Margin is referred to by scholars as the "70-Chapter Edition". In addition to the large changes described above, Jin also changes the text of the remaining chapters in three general ways. First, he improves the consistency of some sections, such that, for example, chapters whose content do not match their titles receive new names. Secondly, Jin makes the text more compact by removing sections that he feels do not advance the story, and by excising the incidental Shi and Ci verses. Finally, Jin makes subtle changes to the text for pure literary effect. These changes range from emphasizing the emotions of characters to changing story elements to make them more compelling.

Jin's critical commentary frequently oscillates between sympathizing with the individual bandit-heroes and condemning their status as outlaws. On one hand, he criticizes the evil official system that has led many of the 108 heroes to become bandits. He also expresses admiration for several of the men. On the other hand, he calls the band "malignant" and "evil". He especially criticizes Song Jiang, the leader of the group. Jin's removal of the last 30 (or 50) chapters of the novel can be seen as an extension of his condemnation of banditry. In these chapters, the bandits are pardoned by Imperial edict, and are put in service of the country. Jin's version, by contrast, has all of the bandits captured and executed. He follows this ending with eight reasons why outlawry can never be tolerated.

Later readers of Jin have advanced two main theories for his divergent positions of admiring the bandits and yet denouncing them as a group. Hu Shih argues that China during Jin's life was being torn apart by two bands of outlaws, so Jin did not believe that banditry should be glorified in fiction. This agrees well with Jin's philosophy. His Buddhist and Taoist beliefs advocated natural development for every individual in society, while the Confucian part of him respected the emperor and the state as the ultimate authority. The other possibility is that Jin's attempt to reimage the novel into a condemnation of the bandits was to save the novel after it had been banned by the Chongzhen Emperor. This second theory is far-fetched, as the emperor's decree banning the novel was not promulgated until a year after the completion of Jin's commentary. Jin's views on the characters aside, he has unconditional praise for the novel as a work of art. He praises the vivid and lively characters of the novel, saying, "The Water Margin tells a story of 108 men: yet each has his own nature, his own temperament, his own outward appearance, and his own voice". He also praises the work's vivid description of events, frequently remarking that the prose is "like a picture". Finally, Jin appreciates the technical virtuosity of the author, and names 15 separate techniques used by Shi Naian.

=== Commentary on the Romance of the Western Chamber ===
In 1656, Jin completed his second major commentary, written on the Romance of the Western Chamber, a 13th-century Yuan dynasty play. This commentary follows a structure very similar to Jin's earlier commentary on the Water Margin. It begins with two prefaces outlining Jin's reasons for writing the commentary followed by a third with notes on how the play should be read. The play itself follows, with introductory marks preceding each chapter and critical comments frequently inserted in the text itself. Jin undertakes fewer major structural alterations in this commentary than he does in critiquing the Water Margin. Each of parts I, III, IV, and V of the play is originally preceded by an "Induction". Jin merges these into the acts themselves. Part II of the play originally consists of five acts, which Jin condenses into four by merging the first and second acts.

As with the Water Margin, Jin frequently makes editorial changes to the play itself. These changes fall into two broad categories. Many changes are made in order to make the play's two young lovers, Zhang Sheng and Cui Yingying, act and speak in accordance with their high class backgrounds. Jin particularly expresses his admiration for Yingying's beauty and character, and modifies any scenes which he feels painted her in too vulgar a light. Other changes are made for the simple reason of achieving superior literary effect. In the arias of the play, these changes include removing supernumerary words and changing words to more vivid descriptors. The strict metrical requirements of the aria format makes it difficult for Jin to make large-scale changes to these sections. However, some changes do violate the rhyme scheme as it existed during the Tang dynasty or the rules of prosody. In the spoken sections of the play, Jin is much more liberal in making editorial changes. Many of these are intended to accentuate the emotions of the characters. The end result is that Jin's version of the play is an excellent literary work, but was viewed by contemporaries as unfit for the stage.

In his commentary, Jin frequently criticizes previous "unknowledgeable" readers, saying that they have missed many hidden meanings in the text. He sees it as his duty as a knowledgeable reader to reveal these meanings which the author has placed for him to find. In doing so, Jin also has the goal of portraying the play as worthy of study due to its deep technical, artistic, psychological, and social dimensions. In content, much of Jin's critical comments focus on the skill of the author in conveying emotions. Jin praises Romance of the West Chamber as "[one of the most] marvelous [pieces of] writing between heaven and earth". Other comments focus on Yingying. As mentioned above, Jin feels that she is the central character of the play, and a woman of great beauty and character. Jin feels that the play shows a great degree of unity and tightness in its structure. This opinion can be seen explicitly in his comments, as well as in the fact that he does not make structural alterations to the play to nearly the degree as in his version of Water Margin. Jin does, however, comment on Part V of the play. This part has been thought by some commentators to be a continuation added by an author other than Wang Shifu. Jin agrees with this view, criticizing the last part as being inferior in quality to the previous sections and continuing the story past its vital point.

== Reputation and legacy ==
Many contemporaries admired Jin as a man of great literary talent. Qian Qianyi, a famous scholar, official, and historian of the late Ming dynasty, proclaimed that Jin was possessed by a spirit, explaining his talent. In a biography of Jin, Liao Yan wrote that Jin had discovered the entire secret of competition. Some contemporaries and later writers denounced Jin on moral grounds. Jin's contemporary Kui Zhuang called him "greedy, perverse, licentious, and eccentric".

After the May Fourth Movement in 1919, scholars such as Hu Shih began to advocate the writing of novels in Vernacular Chinese. As a result, Jin gained recognition as a pioneer in the field of Chinese popular literature. Hu Shih himself praised Jin in the preface to his commentary on the Water Margin, saying, "Sheng-t'an's ability to debate was invincible; his pen was most persuasive. During his time, he had the reputation of a genius. His death was also a case of extreme cruelty, which shook the whole country. After his death, his reputation became even greater". Liu Bannong, another scholar of the era, also praised Jin's version of Water Margin as the best edition in terms of literary value.

After the establishment of the People's Republic of China in 1949, Water Margin became a tale of peasant resistance to the ruling class, and Romance of the West Chamber symbolized the casting off of the outmoded traditional marriage system. Jin's critiques and editorial modifications of these works did not mirror the world view of Marxism, however, and he began to be criticized. In more recent years, however, Chinese historians have adopted a more balanced view of Jin.
