= The Forbidden Legend: Sex & Chopsticks 2 =

2009 Hong Kong film by Man Kei Chin

- Traditional Chinese: 金瓶梅2：愛的奴隸
- Simplified Chinese: 金瓶梅2：爱的奴隶
- Hanyu Pinyin: Jīnpíngmeí, Aìdē Núlì
- Directed by: Man Kei Chin
- Based on: Lanling Xiaoxiao Sheng The Golden Lotus
- Produced by: Wong Jing
- Starring: Oscar Lam wai-kin Hayakawa Serina; Wakana Hikaru; Kaera Uehara
- Cinematography: Luo Si
- Edited by: Pan Xiong
- Music by: Luo Jian
- Production companies: My Way Film Company Limited, Twin Co. Ltd, Universal Media & Entertainment Group
- Distributed by: Mega-Vision Pictures (MVP) (2009), Maxam (2010), Tornado Film (2010), Joy Sales Film and Video Distributors (2009) (DVD), Madman Entertainment (2012) (DVD)
- Release date: 1 April 2009
- Running time: 92 minutes
- Country: Hong Kong
- Languages: Mandarin; Cantonese
- Box office: $228,343

The Forbidden Legend: Sex & Chopsticks 2 (simplified Chinese: 金瓶梅2：爱的奴隶; traditional Chinese: 金瓶梅2：愛的奴隸; pinyin: Jīnpíngmeí, Aìdē Núlì; lit. 'Golden Lotus 2: Love Slaves') is a 2009 Hong Kong sex film and sequel to The Forbidden Legend: Sex & Chopsticks, adapted from Lanling Xiaoxiao Sheng's classical novel The Golden Lotus. It was produced by Wong Jing and directed by Man Kei Chin. The film stars Oscar Lam wai-kin, Hayakawa Serina, Wakana Hikaru, and Kaera Uehara.

== Plot ==
The film is a very loose adaptation of chapters 11-100 of the novel, telling the story of how Ximen Qing meets his wife Li Ping'er and mistress Pang Chunmei.

== Cast ==
- Oscar Lam wai-kin as Ximen Qing
- Hayakawa Serina as Pan Jinlian
- Wakana Hikaru as Ming Yue
- Kaera Uehara as Zi Yan/ Li Ping'er
- Liang Minyi as Chun Mei
- Tan Qiancong as Hua Zixu
- Angel Wu as Wu Song
- Frankie Ng Chi Hung as Wu Dalang

== Release ==
It was released in Hong Kong on 1 April 2009.
