= Golden Lotus =

Golden Lotus may refer to:

- Musella lasiocarpa, the plant that produces the Golden lotus flower and banana
- Golden Lotus (album), a 1982 album by Kenny Barron
- The Golden Lotus, and Other Legends of Japan, an 1883 book by Edward Greey

== Jin Ping Mei ==
- Jin Ping Mei, a 17th-century Chinese novel
- Pan Jinlian, the female protagonist of the novel, also translated as "Golden Lotus"
- The Golden Lotus (film), a 1974 Hong Kong film based on the novel
- Golden Lotus (musical), a musical based on the novel

== Film awards ==
- Golden Lotus Awards (Macau International Movie Festival)
- Golden Lotus Awards (Vietnam Film Festival)
- National Film Awards, several feature film awards are known as Golden Lotus Awards
