= Golden Lotus (musical) =

Musical by George Chiang

- Golden Lotus Film Poster
- Music: George Chiang
- Lyrics: George Chiang
- Book: George Chiang
- Basis: Jin Ping Mei (The Golden Lotus)
- Premiere: September 12, 2014: Y-Theatre, Hong Kong
- Productions: 2014 Hong Kong
- Awards: Full list

Golden Lotus is a musical written and composed by George Chiang. The musical is based on the classic 17th-century Chinese novel Jin Ping Mei (The Golden Lotus). Set amidst the dying, war-torn years of Song dynasty China, the musical tells the story of the Golden Lotus (Pan Jinlian), whose desire for true love leads her into a web of deception and desperation with the valiant tiger slayer Wu Sung, the rich and powerful Xi Men (Ximen Qing), and the humble peddler Wu Da (Wu Dalang).

== Development ==
Golden Lotus participated in the ASCAP Foundation/Disney Theatrical Productions Musical Theatre Workshop in New York City during March and April 2003 with artistic direction by Stephen Schwartz. The three-week workshop included two live performances by a cast of sixteen performers which included Harriet Chung as Golden Lotus, and Scott Watanabe (who also served as the music director) as the District Intendant.

The musical was presented to a series of focus groups, which led to further revisions. This was followed by a year-long workshop led by Jim Betts with Script Lab's workshop in Toronto, modeled after BMI's Lehman Engels Musical Theater workshop in New York. Following the workshop, Betts worked directly with Chiang for several months on the musical as its dramaturge.

== Hong Kong World Premiere ==
On September 12, 2014, Golden Lotus premiered in Hong Kong at the Y-Theatre with a cast of twenty-six performers. The production featured Harriet Chung as the title character, Boon Ho Sung as Wu Sung, and Ronan Pak Kin Yan as Ximen. Also featured were Billy Sy as Wu Da, Samantha Fa as Madam Wang, Scott Watanabe as the District Intendant, Marc Ngan as the Fruit Peddler, and Soraya Chau as Ping. Emily Chan directed the production, with music arrangements by George Gao, choreography by Ivy Chung, and set and costume design by Moe Mo.

The production hailed Golden Lotus as "Hong Kong's First Musical." Its signature pop love song, "A World Away", has been praised. The production was recognized with three Hong Kong English Drama Award nominations for Best Show, Best Actress (Harriet Chung), and Best Original Work.

== Musical film ==
The Hong Kong production of Golden Lotus was captured live during four consecutive performances and later edited into a feature-length film showcased at film festivals during 2021–2023. The musical film won over 60 awards across multiple categories, including Best Picture of the Festival at the 2023 World Independent Cinema Awards (WICA). Golden Lotus was selected as the standout film of the year and named the best film from all 11 festivals.

On May 1, 2024, Golden Lotus began streaming on the Stratford Festival's digital platform. Chiang called the deal a "proper alignment" with Straftest@Home due to their commitment to showcasing world-class theater.

== Musical numbers ==
Act I
	Song	Performer(s)
1	"Prologue"	Fruit Peddler
2	"Wu Sung Slayed the Tiger"	Fruit Peddler, District Intendant, Townspeople
3	"Captain of the Guard"	Wu Sung, Chingho Guards
4	"Fresh Buns for Sale"	Wu Da, Street Kid, Fruit Peddler, Townspeople, Xi Men
5	"Confrontation"	Wu Sung, Xi Men
6	"Reunited"	Wu Da, Wu Sung
7	"When I Close My Eyes"	Golden Lotus
8	"Forgive Me"	Golden Lotus, Xi Men
9	"Ten Thousand Fold Happiness"	Golden Lotus, Wu Da, Wu Sung
10	"Loyalty"	Golden Lotus, Wu Sung
11	"Verdant Spring Bordello"	Sing-Song Girls, Patrons, Madam Wang, Xi Men
12	"Paradise"	Xi Men, Sing-Song Girls
13	"Her Name is Golden Lotus"	Madam Wang, Sing-Song Girls, Xi Men
14	"Garnering the Glow"	Madam Wang, Xi Men, Sing-Song Girls
15	"Fresh Buns for Sale " (Reprise)	Wu Da, Fruit Peddler, Madam Wang, District Intendant, Xi Men
16	"Imperial Envoy"	District Intendant
17	"As Each Day Goes By"	Golden Lotus, Wu Sung
18	"Fried Dumplings"	Golden Lotus, Wu Sung
19	"Dreams of My Heart"	Golden Lotus, Wu Sung
20	"A World Away"	Golden Lotus
21	"Life or Death"	Madam Wang, Xi Men, Golden Lotus
22	"Purple Stone Street"	Fruit Peddler, Street Peddlers, Townspeople, Madam Wang
23	"Clandestine Affair"	Fruit Peddler, Street Peddlers, Townspeople
24	"The Perfect Plan"	Wu Da, Madam Wang, Golden Lotus, Xi Men

Act II
	Song	Performer(s)
25	"Does Anyone Here Know?"	Wu Sung, Townspeople, Fruit Peddler, Madam Wang
26	"Keep on Looking Down the Street"	Fruit Peddler, Wu Sung
27	"Flag of Death"	Wu Sung, Ghosts, Wu Da
28	"WaterLily Pavilion"	Xi Men's Wives, Xi Men
29	"Fallen"	Wu Sung, Golden Lotus, Xi Men
30	"Banished"	District Intendant, Xi Men
31	"A World Away" (Reprise)	Golden Lotus
32	"Little Brother Mandarin"	Xi Men, District Intendant, Ping, Wedding Guests
33	"Little Brother Mandarin (Reprise)"	Ping
34	"Lord of the Five Ways"	Ping, Golden Lotus, Ghosts, Xi Men
35	"The Concubines"	Fruit Peddler
36	"Destiny"	Wu Sung, Soldiers
37	"The Auction"	Madam Wang, District Intendant, Fruit Peddler, Wu Sung
38	"Eternity"	Wu Sung, Golden Lotus, Madam Wang
39	"When I Close my Eyes" (Finale)	Wu Sung, Golden Lotus

== Albums ==
Golden Lotus: Sounds From The Musical was released on May 31, 2015. It is a CD consisting of 15 songs from the musical as they appeared in the Hong Kong world premiere. It was recorded in Toronto with Harriet Chung as Golden Lotus, Charles Azulay as Wu Sung, Thom Allison as Xi Men, George Chiang as Wu Da, Stacey-Lea Marhue as Madam Wang, Scott Watanabe as the District Intendant, Pierre Bayuga as the Fruit Peddler, and Josette Jorge as Ping. The music and its vocal arrangements were directed by Tim Stiff, and the music arrangements was by George Gao.

Track Listing – Golden Lotus: Sounds From The Musical
No.	Title	Singer(s)	Length
1.	"Wu Sung Slayed the Tiger"	Scott Watanabe	4:07
2.	"Captain of the Guard"	Chales Azulay	2:17
3.	"Fresh Buns for Sale"	George Chiang; Thom Allison; Lauren De Simon	1:43
4.	"Paradise"	Thom Allison	2:15
5.	"Her Name Is Golden Lotus"	Stacey-Lea Marhue	2:45
6.	"As Each Day Goes By"	Harriet Chung; Charles Azulay	2:40
7.	"A World Away"	Harriet Chung	3:31
8.	"Purple Stone Street"	Pierre Bayuga	2:31
9.	"Clandestine Affair"	Pierre Bayuga	2:56
10.	"Does Anybody Here Know?"	Charles Azulay, Pierre Bayuga	3:04
11.	"Flag of Death"	Charles Azulay: George Chiang	4:25
12.	"Waterlily Pavilion"	Marisa Mclntyre, Katie Beetham, Leah Canali: Sarah Strange	2:34
13.	"a World Away"	Harriet Chung	2:21
14.	"Little Brother Mandarin"	Thom Allison; Scott Watanabe, Josette Jorge	3:52
15.	"Destiny"	Charles Azulay	3:42
Total length:			40:28

Golden Lotus: Sounds From The Musical (Deluxe Edition) was released on December 1, 2023, and features 4 additional tracks from the musical, which are: "When I Close My Eyes", "Verdant Spring Bordello", "Little Brother Mandarin (Reprise)", and "Lord of the Five Ways".

Track Listing – Golden Lotus: Sounds From The Musical (Deluxe Edition)
No.	Title	Singer(s)	Length
1.	"Wu Sung Slayed the Tiger"	Scott Watanabe: George Chiang	4:07
2.	"Captain of the Guard"	Chales Azulay: George Chiang	2:17
3.	"Fresh Buns for Sale"	George Chiang; Thom Allison; Lauren De Simon	1:43
4.	"When I Close My Eyes"	Harriet Chung; George Chiang	2:39
5.	"Verdant Spring Bordello"	Stacey-Lea Marhue: George Chiang	4:10
6.	"Paradise"	Thom Allison; George Chiang	2:15
7.	"Her Name Is Golden Lotus"	Stacey-Lea Marhue: George Chiang	2:45
8.	"As Each Day Goes By"	Harriet Chung; Charles Azulay: George Chiang	2:40
9.	"A World Away"	Harriet Chung; George Chiang	3:31
10.	"Purple Stone Street"	Pierre Bayuga: George Chiang	2:31
11.	"Clandestine Affair"	Pierre Bayuga: George Chiang	2:56
12.	"Does Anybody Here Know?"	Charles Azulay: George Chiang	3:04
13.	"Flag of Death"	Charles Azulay: George Chiang	4:23
14.	"Waterlily Pavilion"	Marisa Mclntyre: George Chiang; Katie Beetham, Leah Canali: Sarah Strange	2:34
15.	"A World Away (Reprise)"	Harriet Chung; George Chiang	2:16
16.	"Little Brother Mandarin"	Thom Allison; George Chiang; Scott Watanabe, Josette Jorge	3:52
17.	"Little Brother Mandarin (Reprise)"	Josette Jorge: George Chiang	0:30
18.	"Lord of the Five Ways"	Harriet Chung; George Chiang	4:46
19.	"Destiny"	Charles Azulay: George Chiang	3:41
Total length:			56:09

== Singles ==
A single of the signature pop ballad from Golden Lotus, "A World Away", was recorded by Harriet Chung. The song was arranged by Warren Robert, who also conducted the live orchestra for the recording. The single and its music video were released on August 25, 2020, as "A World Away (Remix)". The single won Best Original Song at the Hollywood Gold Awards.

Harriet Chung recorded a solo version and music video of the signature duet from Golden Lotus, "As Each Day Goes By" on October 6, 2023. The single and its music video won Best Original Song and Best Music Video at the International Gold Awards.
