= The Golden Lotus (film) =

1974 Hong Kong film by Li Han-hsiang

- Film poster
- Traditional Chinese: 金瓶雙艷
- Simplified Chinese: 金瓶双艳
- Hanyu Pinyin: Jīnpíng Shuāngyàn
- Directed by: Li Han-hsiang
- Written by: Li Han-hsiang
- Based on: The Golden Lotus (Lanling Xiaoxiaosheng)
- Produced by: Run Run Shaw
- Starring: Peter Yang; Hu Jin; Tien Lie; Chen Ping
- Cinematography: Lin Chao
- Edited by: Jiang Xinglong
- Music by: Frankie Chan
- Production company: Shaw Brothers Studio
- Distributed by: Shaw Brothers Studio
- Release date: 17 January 1974 (Hong Kong)
- Running time: 112 minutes
- Country: Hong Kong
- Languages: Mandarin; Cantonese

The Golden Lotus is a 1974 Hong Kong sex film directed and written by Li Han-hsiang, and produced by Run Run Shaw. The film stars Peter Yang, Hu Jin, Tien Lie, and Chen Ping. Hong Kong Kung fu star Jackie Chan made his film debut in this film in a minor role as Brother Yun. It is based on the c. 1610 novel of the same name by Lanling Xiaoxiaosheng. The film premiered in Hong Kong on 17 January 1974.

== Cast ==
- Peter Yang as Ximen Qing.
- Hu Jin as Pan Jinlian.
- Tien Lie as Li Ping'er (Chinese: 李瓶兒).
- Chen Ping as Pang Chunmei

Other

- Wang Lai as Matchmaker Wang (Chinese: 王婆).
- Jiang Nan as Wu Dalang.
- Tian Qing as Hua Zixu (Chinese: 花子虛).
- Dean Shek as Jiang Zhushan (Chinese: 蔣竹山).
- Jackie Chan as Brother Yun (Chinese: 鄆哥).
- Liu Wuqi as Wu Yin'er (Chinese: 吳銀兒).
- Xu Yu as Wu Yueniang (Chinese: 吳月娘).
- Gu Qiuqin as Li Jiao'er (Chinese: 李嬌兒).
- Jiang Ling as Meng Yulou (Chinese: 孟玉樓).
- Apple Xia as Sun Xue'e (Chinese: 孫雪娥).
- Wong Yue as the servant (Chinese: 琴童).
- Liu Huiling as Ying Chun (Chinese: 迎春).

== Release ==
It was released in Hong Kong on 17 January 1974.

== Critical response ==
Critics praised the film, particularly its faithfulness to the original novel and Hu Jin's acting.
