= Pal Sinn =

- 單立文
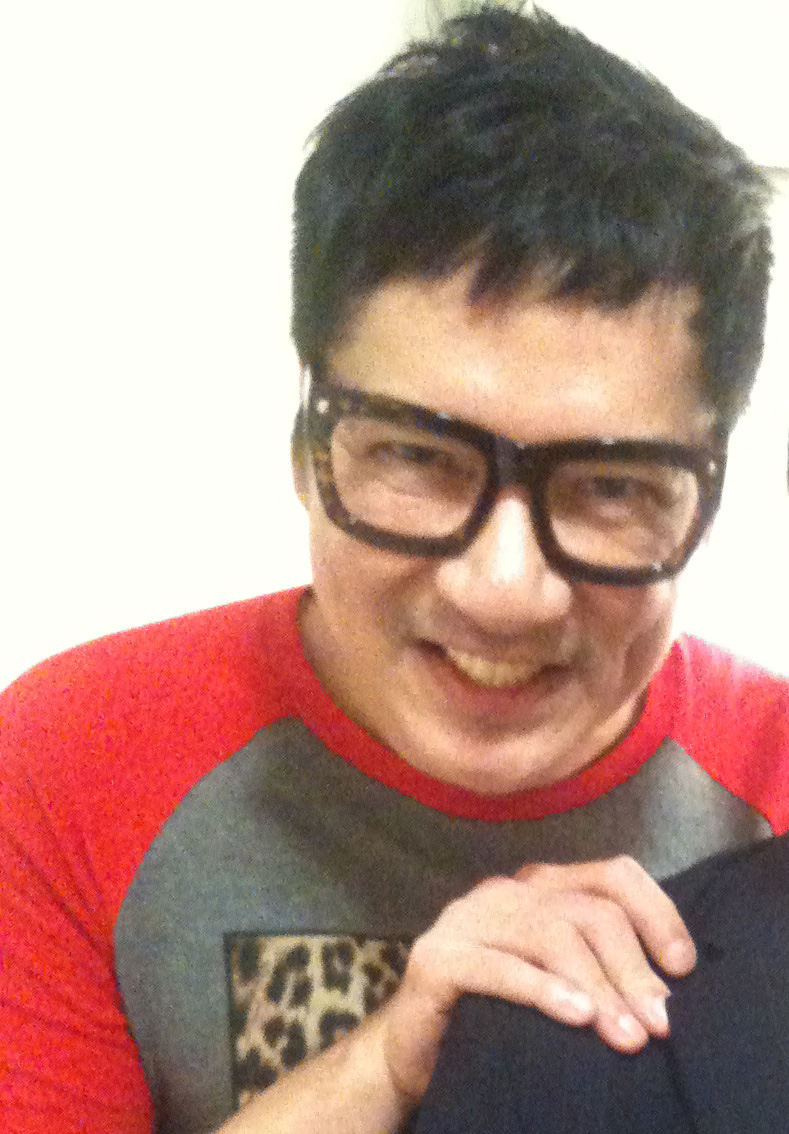
- Sinn in 2012
- Born: Pal Sinn Lap-man; 17 March 1959 (age 67); British Hong Kong
- Education: Lung Cheung Government Secondary School
- Occupations: Musician; songwriter; actor; television host
- Years active: 1983–present
- Spouse: Paisley Wu (m. 2008)
- Musical career
- Genres: Rock; Cantopop
- Instruments: Bass guitar; vocals; guitar
- Labels: TVB (1993–2004, 2012–present); Now TV (2011–2012)
- Formerly of: Blue Jeans

Chinese name
- Traditional Chinese: 單立文
- Simplified Chinese: 单立文
Transcriptions
Standard Mandarin
- Hanyu Pinyin: Shàn Lìwén
Yue: Cantonese
- Jyutping: Sin6 Lap6man4

Pal Sinn Lap-man (born 17 March 1959) is a Hong Kong musician and actor.

Sinn is noted for his roles as Sai-Mun Hing in The Reincarnation of Golden Lotus, for which he received Hong Kong Film Award nomination for Best New Performer.

== Life ==
=== Early life ===
Sinn was born and raised in Hong Kong, where he attended the Lung Cheung Government Technical Secondary School in the early 1970s.

=== Career ===
At 16, Sinn began his career as a singer at a bar on Lockhart Road, Wanchai, Hong Kong.

In 1986, Sinn joined Chyna, a heavy metal rock band founded by Donald Ashley. After the band was disbanded, then he founded the Blue Jeans with Su Dehua, but Blue Jeans was disbanded in 1990.

He had his first experience in front of the camera in 1986, and he was chosen to act as a support actor in Jeffrey Lau's Operation Pink Squad, an action film starring Sandra Ng, Guan Xiumei, Ann Bridgewater, Elsie Chan, and Charlie Cho.

For his role as Sai-Mun Hing in The Reincarnation of Golden Lotus (1989), Sinn was nominated for the Hong Kong Film Award for Best New Performer. That same year, he participated in Tai Kit Mak's All Night Long, a story film starring Carol Cheng, Shui-Fan Fung, Elizabeth Lee, Elsie Chan, Crystal Kwok, and Wu Ma. Then he appeared as a fast food restaurant staff in Clarence Fok's The Iceman Cometh, the film stars Yuen Biao, Yuen Wah, and Maggie Cheung.

He co-starred with Michelle Monique Reis, Natalis Chan and Iwanbeo Leung in Yuen Cheung-Yan's Coup De Grace (1990). Sinn also filmed in Love Is Love, alongside Stephen Chow, Suki Kwan, Sandra Ng, and Sing Fui On.

In 1991, Sinn played Hussein, who is a gambler, in Wong Jing's God of Gamblers II, an action film starring Andy Lau, Stephen Chow, and Ng Man Tat. That same year, he starred as Sai-Mun Hing in The Golden Lotus 'Love and Desire', based on the novel The Golden Lotus by Lanling Xiaoxiaosheng.

In 1992, Sinn portrayed Gao Ya'nei, the son of Grand Marshal Gao Qiu, in All Men Are Brothers – Blood of the Leopard, adapted from Shi Nai'an's classical novel The Water Margin. The film also stars Tony Leung, Joey Wang, and Elvis Tsui.

In 1993, Sinn had a minor role as Da Jiaoban in Wong Jing's City Hunter, which starred Jackie Chan, Chingmy Yau, Joey Wang, and Richard Norton.

In 1994, Sinn starred in a historical film called Fire Dragon with Brigitte Lin, Max Mok, and Sandra Ng, directed by Yuen Woo-ping. He played the lead role in Whatever You Want, opposite Jordan Chan, Anita Yuen, and Law Kar-ying.

In 1995, Sinn appeared as Julian in Detective Investigation Files II, he also participated in its sequel Detective Investigation Files IV (1999).

In 2007, Sinn was cast in Ho-Cheung Pang's Exodus, a suspense film starring Simon Yam, Irene Wan, and Nick Cheung.

Sinn had a cameo appearance in Dream Home (2010), which starred Eason Chan as Zheng Lichang's lover (played by Josie Ho).

In 2011, Sinn acted in the romantic comedy film Lan Kwai Fong.

In 2012, Sinn had a supporting role in The Silent War, a film adaptation based on the novel Plot by Mai Jia.

== Personal life ==
In the 1980s, Sinn dated Anita Mui.

Sinn began dating Paisley Wu in 1996, and they married in 2008.

== Instruments ==
Pal Sinn has played a number of basses in his music career, such Tune, Fodera and Bacchus.

== Filmography ==
=== Film ===
Year	English Title	Chinese Title	Role	Notes
1987	Erotic Ghost Story	聊斋艳谭	Wu Shentong	
1988	Carry On Hotel	金装大酒店		
1988	Operation Pink Squad	霸王女福星	Piu	
1989	All Night Long	夜疯狂	Lao B	
1989	The Reincarnation of Golden Lotus	潘金莲之前世今生	Ximen Qing	
1989	The Iceman Cometh	急冻奇侠	Head of thieves	
1990	Coup De Grace	起尾注	Wan Yusheng	
1990	Love Is Love	望夫成龙	Nancy's former boyfriend	
1990		猛鬼霸王花	A Lang	
1991	God of Gamblers II	赌侠	Hussein	
1991	The Golden Lotus "Love and Desire"	金瓶风月	Ximen Qing	
1991	Queen of the Underworld	夜生活女王之霞姐传奇	Alan	
1992	All Men Are Brothers – Blood of the Leopard	水浒传之英雄本色	Gao Ya'nei	
1992	The Demon Wet Nurse	半妖乳娘	Wei Zhongxian	
1992		素女经之挑情宝鉴	Ying Feng	
1993	City Hunter	城市猎人	Da Jiaoban	
1993	Ming Ghost	圣女的欲望	Xiong Yan	
1993	On Parole No.2 – Do Unto Others	狱凤之杀出重围	Donald	
1994	Fire Dragon	火云传奇	His Royal Highness	
1994	Whatever You Want	珠光宝气	Wong Jingwei	
1994	Hunting List	终极猎杀	Chou Jin	
1994	The Amorous Lotus Pan	少女潘金莲	Wu Song/ Ximen Qing	
1994		沉默的姑娘	Pal	
1995	Madame Bamboo	竹夫人	Fan Erhu	
1995		笑林小子之无敌反斗星	Su Qi'er	
1996		新金瓶梅	Ximen Qing	
2004		妙贼偷天	Lei Jian	
2004		婚前杀行为	Bowie	
2006		美好时光		
2007		马己仙峡道		
2007	Exodus	出埃及记	Zhang Fang's father	
2010		算吧啦，老豆	Ding Li	
2010	Dream Home	维多利亚一号	guest	
2011	Lan Kwai Fong	喜爱夜蒲	A Gong	
2012	The Silent War	听风者	Luo San'er	
2013		古惑仔江湖新秩序	Jiang Tiansheng	
2015	The Gigolo		Abson	

=== Television ===
Year	English Title	Chinese Title	Role	Notes
1993	Eternity	千歲情人	Shing Sai-chun	
1994	Gentle Reflections	恨鎖金瓶	Sai Mun-hing	
1995	Detective Investigation Files II	刑事偵緝檔案II	Julian Sum Long-wai	
1997	Mystery Files	迷離檔案	Chan Bo / Lee Tsz-chiu	
1997	Time Before Time	大鬧廣昌隆	Wong Tin-ling	
1999	Road To Eternity	布袋和尚	Monk Chi Hong	
1999	Detective Investigation Files IV	刑事偵緝檔案IV	CYC Chui Yee-chi	
2000	Armed Reaction II	陀槍師姐II	James Cheung Shuk-ming	
2002	Legal Entanglement	法网伊人	Yuen Ka-chun	
2004	ICAC Investigators 2004	廉正行動2004	Fok Wah-biu	
2004	Dream of Colours	下一站彩虹	Mario Law Cho-yiu	
2004	A Handful of Love	一屋兩家三姓人	Michael Ko Chi-sau	
2010	Don Juan De Mercado	情人眼裏高一D	Judge	
2013	Awfully Lawful	熟男有惑	Jazz Lam Cheuk-sze	
2013	Triumph in the Skies II	衝上雲霄II	King Ka-chun	
2014	Never Dance Alone	女人俱樂部	Lek Lek	
2014	The Ultimate Addiction	點金勝手	Ken Wong Ching-wah	
2014	Tomorrow Is Another Day	再戰明天	Yip Sai-heung	
2014	Tiger Cubs II	飛虎II	Loot Lat	
2015	With or Without You	東坡家事	Wong On-shek	
2015	Angel In-the-Making	實習天使	Kennedy Tong Yat-chun	
2016	The Rogue Emperor	流氓皇帝	Che Tai-pao	
2016	Over Run Over	EU超時任務	PC Chan King-wai	
2017-now	Come Home Love: Lo and Behold	愛·回家之開心速遞	Hung Shu-yan	
2017	May Fortune Smile On You	財神駕到	Wong Bak-man / Wong Yat-sin	
2017	Burning Hands	乘勝狙擊	Fok Chun-sing	
2017	Legal Mavericks	踩過界	T.Y. Tai Tak-yan	
2019	Finding Her Voice	牛下女高音	Choir member	
2021	The Forgotten Day	失憶24小時	Chiang Lung	

== Discography ==
=== Albums ===
Year	English Title	Chinese Title	Label	Notes
1989	Blue Jeans	蓝战士	CBS/ Sony	
1988	I Will Always Be Your Friend	永远是你好友	CBS/ Sony	
1988	Blue Jeans	蓝战士	CBS/ Sony	
1983	There's Rock & Roll in Chyna			

== Awards and nominations ==
Year	Work	Award	Result	Ref.
1990	The Reincarnation of Golden Lotus	Hong Kong Film Award for Best New Performer	Nominated	
