= The Forbidden Legend: Sex & Chopsticks =

2008 Hong Kong film by Qian Wenqi

- Traditional Chinese: 金瓶梅
- Simplified Chinese: 金瓶梅
- Hanyu Pinyin: Jīnpíngméi
- Directed by: Qian Wenqi
- Based on: Lanling Xiaoxiao Sheng The Golden Lotus
- Produced by: Wong Jing
- Starring: Oscar Lam wai-kin Norman Chui; Hayakawa Serina
- Cinematography: Luo Si
- Edited by: Pan Xiong
- Music by: Luo Jian
- Production company: Hong Kong Mingwei Company
- Distributed by: Shadow Dynasty Company
- Release date: 19 September 2008
- Running time: 90 minutes
- Country: Hong Kong
- Language: Cantonese

The Forbidden Legend: Sex & Chopsticks (Chinese: 金瓶梅; pinyin: Jīnpíngméi; lit. 'Golden Lotus') is a 2008 Hong Kong pornographic comedy film directed by Qian Wenqi and produced by Wong Jing, starring Oscar Lam wai-kin, Norman Chui, and Hayakawa Serina, based on the 1610 novel The Golden Lotus by Lanling Xiaoxiao Sheng. The film premiered in Hong Kong on 19 September 2008.

== Plot ==
The story is loosely based on the first ten chapters of Jin Ping Mei, telling the stories of how Ximen Qing meets two of his eventually six wives, the former Buddhist nun Wu Yueniang (a.k.a. Mingyue) and the mariticide Pan Jinlian.

== Cast ==
- Oscar Lam wai-kin as Ximen Qing
- Norman Chui as Ximen Qing's father
- Hayakawa Serina as Pan Jinlian
- Wakana Hikaru as Ming Yue
- Yui Morikawa as Ximen Qing's mother
- Kaera Uehara as Zi Yan
- Liang Minyi as Chun Mei

Note: Most of the female characters with sex scenes are played by Japanese adult video actresses, with their dialogue dubbed into Chinese.

== Release ==
The film was first released on 19 September 2008 in Hong Kong.

The film received mixed reviews.

== Sequel ==
The film's sequel, The Forbidden Legend Sex & Chopsticks 2, was released in Hong Kong on 1 April 2009.
