= Harriet Chung =

Hong Kong-born actress

Harriet Ho-Yin Chung
- Born: Hong Kong
- Education: Hong Kong Academy of Performing Arts
- Occupations: Singer, dancer, actress, choreographer
- Website: harrietchung.com

Harriet Chung is an actress, singer, and dancer. Chung was born in Hong Kong and studied dance at the Hong Kong Academy of Performing Arts and was a member of the Hong Kong Children's Choir and Yip's Children's Choir.

She moved to Canada to further her dance training at the National Ballet of Canada. She has danced professionally with the Empire State Ballet, Ontario Ballet Theatre, Xing Dance Theatre among others.

She broke into musical theatre with a featured role in the world premiere production of Tiananmen Dreams. Immediately afterwards she joined the Toronto cast of The Phantom of the Opera. She left the show to join the German production of Cats in Hamburg. She then returned to Canada and returned for the final year of the Toronto production of The Phantom of the Opera.

She has since appeared in many musicals such as several productions of The King & I, Iron Road, Starbright, Fiddler on Fire. Chung played the lead role in the opening musical at the 2006 Miss Chinese Toronto Pageant and was a featured performer at the 2014 Mandarin Profile Awards. She was nominated for an Ovation Theatre Award for Outstanding Choreography for her work in the Gateway Theatre production of The King & I in Vancouver, British Columbia. Most recently, Chung performed in the world premiere of Salesman in China at the Stratford Festival, where she received critical acclaim for her comedic portrayal of the resident makeup artist Hui Li and her depth as Auntie Zhao. Her choreography of the Mao-era propaganda opera in the play was described as “fever dream.”

== Golden Lotus ==
Chung received critical acclaim when she starred in the world premiere of the musical Golden Lotus in Hong Kong in September, 2014. Chung was nominated for a Hong Kong English Drama Award for Best Actress (Hecklers Award) for her portrayal of the title character.

Chung also appears in the musical film Golden Lotus, a live capture of the Hong Kong production. This cinematic rendition earned her several awards including Outstanding Actress in an English Language Film at Film Fest International Paris. She received the Best Actor & Director Award (New York) for Best Actress in a Musical, the Only The Best International Film Award for Best Actress (Special Award), and Best Actress at the Dreamz Catcher International Film Festival.

== Recordings ==
Chung's debut album A World Away was released on January 13, 2023. It is an album of 8 songs written and produced by George Chiang, with Chung co-writing The Place For Dreams. The album features a newly arranged version of "A World Away" from Chiang's musical Golden Lotus, titled "A World Away (Remix)." The track was originally released as a single on August 25, 2020. Other tracks released as singles on the album include "Today and Tomorrow," "Old Montreal," "The Place for Dreams," and "Through My Tears."

Track Listing - A World Away
No.	Title	Length
1.	"A World Away (Remix)"	3:29
2.	"Today and Tomorrow"	3:40
3.	"The Place for Dreams"	2:40
4.	"Through My Tears"	3:32
5.	"Vancouver"	3:15
6.	"Old Montreal"	3:32
7.	"Kawartha Lakes"	3:21
8.	"End of Time"	2:40
Total length:		26:11

On December 1, 2023, Chung released A World Away (Deluxe Edition), which featured two additional versions of A World Away: "A World Away (Radio Edit)," which is a shortened version of "A World Away (Remix)," and "A World Away (Acoustic)."

Chung is featured in the titular role of Golden Lotus in the album Golden Lotus: Sounds from the Musical. She appears on three tracks on the album, "A World Away," "As Each Day Goes By" and "A World Away (Reprise)." Chung also recorded two additional tracks on the album Golden Lotus: Sounds from the Musical (Deluxe Edition): When I Close My Eyes and Lord of the Five Ways.

== Real estate dealings ==
In 2019 Chung, with George Chiang, sold a one percent stake in one of seventeen properties they jointly owned in Toronto and were renting out, with the new purchaser then creating a notice on the same day as the sale "informing the tenants that [the new owner] planned to evicted [sic] them for personal use".

== Awards and nominations ==
=== Music and music videos ===
Award	Year	Category	Recipient(s) and nominee(s)	Result
Amsterdam International Film Festival	2021	Best Music Video	A World Away (Remix)	Won
Canadian Cinematography Awards	2021	Best Music Video	A World Away (Remix)	Won
Canadian Cinematography Awards	2023	Best Music Video	Old Montreal	Won
Cult Critic Movie Award	2022	Best Music Video	Old Montreal	Won
Dubai Festival	2022	Best Music Video	Place for Dreams	Won
Dreamz Catcher International Film Festival	2024	Best Music Video - Phenomenal Attainment Award	Popcorn Film	Won
Dreamz Catcher International Film Festival	2024	Best Music Video- Phenomenal Attainment Award	As Each Day Goes By	Won
Dreamz Catcher International Film Festival	2023	Best Music Video- Phenomenal Attainment Award	Today and Tomorrow	Won
Eurasia International Monthly Film Festival	2021	Best Music Video	A World Away (Remix)	Won
Europe Film Festival U.K.	2022	Best Music Video	Place for Dreams	Won
Europe Film Festival U.K.	2021	Short - Best Actress	A World Away (Remix)	Won
Festopedia Cinemas and Scripts	2021	Best Music Video	A World Away (Remix)	Won
Golden Lion International Film Festival	2022	Best Music Video	Place for Dreams	Won
Golden Lion International Film Festival	2023	Best Music Video	As Each Day Goes By	Won
Hollywood Gold Awards	2024	Gold Award - Music Video	Popcorn Film	Won
Hollywood Gold Awards	2024	Silver Award - Original Song	Popcorn Film	Won
Hollywood Gold Awards	2024	Best Music Video	Dawn Till Dusk	Won
Hollywood Gold Awards	2021	Gold Awards Original Song	A World Away (Remix)	Gold Award
International Gold Awards	2024	Gold Award - Music Video	Popcorn Film	Won
International Gold Awards	2024	Gold Award - Original Song	Popcorn Film	Won
International Gold Awards	2023	Gold Award Music Video	As Each Day Goes By	Won
International Gold Awards	2023	Gold Award Original Song	As Each Day Goes By	Won
London Movie Awards	2021	Best Original Song		Honorable Mention
London Movie Awards	2023	Silver Award: Original Song	Today and Tomorrow	Won
Los Angeles Film Awards	2023	Best Music Video	Today and Tomorrow	Won
New York Cinematography Awards	2022	Best Song	Old Montreal	Won
New York Movie Awards	2024	Silver Award: Original Song	Popcorn Film	Won
New York Movie Awards	2023	Best Music Video	As Each Day Goes By	Won
New York Movie Awards	2023	Gold Award: Original Song	Today and Tomorrow	Won
Open Window International Film Challenge	2021	Best Music Video	A World Away (Remix)	Won
Paris Film Awards	2024	Best Music Video	Popcorn Film	Won
Paris Film Awards	2024	Best Original Song	Popcorn Film	Won
Rome Movie Awards	2021	Best Music Video	A World Away (Remix)	Won
Rome Movie Awards	2022	Best Cinematography	Place for Dreams	Won
Royal Society of Television And Motion Picture Awards	2022	Best Music Video	Old Montreal	Won
Silver Mask Live Festival (Los Angeles)	2021	Best Music Video	A World Away (Remix)	Won
San Diego Movie Awards	2023	Best Director Music Video	Today and Tomorrow	Honorable Mention
Seattle Filmmaker Awards	2023	Best Music Video	Today and Tomorrow	Won
Sweden Film Awards	2021	Best Music Video	A World Away (Remix)	Won
Swedish International Film Festival	2022	Best Music Video	Old Montreal	Won
Swedish International Film Festival	2023	Best Music Video	As Each Day Goes By	Won
Virgin Spring Cinefest	2021	Best Music Video	A World Away (Remix)	Outstanding Achievement
Virgin Spring Cinefest	2022	Best Music Video	Old Montreal	Won
World Distribution Award (London)	2021	Best Music Video	A World Away (Remix)	Won
World Class Film Awards	2023	Best Artist of the Future	Old Montreal	Won

=== Film ===
Award	Year	Category	Recipient(s) and nominee(s)	Result
Barcelona International Film Festival	2022	Best Actress	Golden Lotus (musical)	Won
Best Actor& Director Awards - New York	2021	Best Actress in a Musical	Golden Lotus (musical)	Won
Dreamz Catcher International Film Festival	2022	Best Actress	Golden Lotus (musical)	Won
Film Fest International Paris	2022	Outstanding Actress in an English Language Film	Golden Lotus (musical)	Won
Only The Best Film Awards	2021	Best Actress	Golden Lotus (musical)	Special Award

=== Theatre ===
Award	Year	Category	Recipient(s) and nominee(s)	Result
Hecklers Awards	2015	Best Actress	Golden Lotus	Nomination
Ovation Theatre Award	2014	Outstanding Choreography	The King & I	Nomination
