= Shunsui =

- Gender: Male

Origin
- Origin: Japanese
- Meaning: Different meanings depending on the kanji used

Shunsui (written: 春水, 春翠 or 舜水) is a masculine Japanese given name. Notable people with the name include:

- Shunsui Matsuda (松田 春翠; 1925–1987), Japanese benshi
- Miyagawa Shunsui (宮川 春水), 18th-century Japanese painter and printmaker
- Tamenaga Shunsui (為永 春水; 1790–1844), pen name of Sasaki Sadataka, Japanese writer
- Shu Shunsui (朱 舜水; 1600–1682), Chinese scholar in Japan

== Fictional characters ==
- Shunsui Kyōraku, a character in the manga series Bleach
