= The Loyal Ronins =

1880 novel by Shunsui Tamenaga

The Loyal Ronins: An Historical Romance
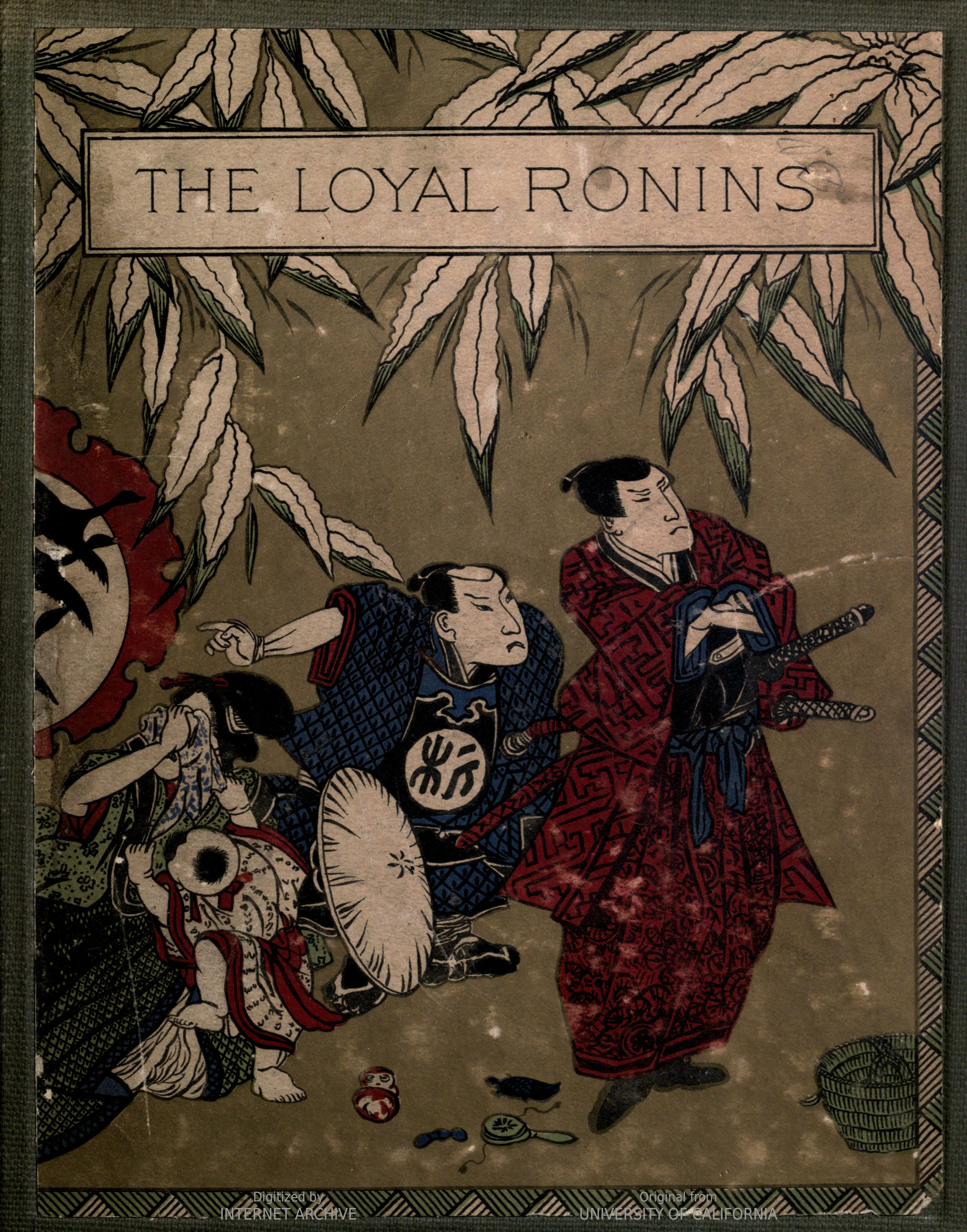
- Illustrated cover designed and drawn by Greey
- Author: Shunsui Tamenaga
- Translators: Edward Greey; Shinichiro Saito
- Published: G. P. Putnam's Sons, 1880

The Loyal Ronins is the title of an English translation made by Edward Greey and Shinichiro Saito from the Japanese historical tale Seishi jitsuden iroha bunko by Shunsui Tamenaga. The book is profusely illustrated with characteristic Japanese pictures by Kei-Sai Yei-Sen of Yedo or Tokio.

== Synopsis ==
The Loyal Ronins relates to affairs that occurred in 1698. Lord Morningfield, Daimio of Ako, is condemned to commit hara-kiri (through the treachery and deceit of Sir Kara, master of ceremonies to the Shogun), and his property is confiscated. His widow, Lady Fair-Face, assumes the religious name of Pure-Gem and lives in retirement. Forty-seven of his retainers — now Ronins, or outlaws of the Samurai class — sign with their blood an agreement to avenge his death. Under the leadership of Sir Big-Rock, who divorces his wife and disowns his children, that they may not be punished for his deeds, the Ronins slay Sir Kira in his own house. After imposing ceremonies of respect at the tomb of their illustrious chief, the Ronins surrender themselves to the Council at Yedo. They are condemned to death and sentenced to commit hara-kiri. Forty-six forms clothed in pure white, headed by Sir Big-Rock, mount the hill of death, plunge into the dark river, and pass over to Paradise, where they are welcomed by the spirit of their beloved chief.

== Development ==
The translation was done by Greey, an English-American with long experience in Japan, with the assistance of Shiuichiro Saito, a young Japanese, then practising Law in Boston. The book made about 300 pages, and contained the thirty full-plate illustrations by Kei-Sai Yei-Sen, of Yedo, which were printed with the Japanese edition of Iroha bunko. The cover was designed and drawn by Greey after a Japanese design.

== Appraisal ==
Helen Rex Keller writes, "The main story is very simple, though there are numerous episodes touching or humorous. ... The graceful poetic style gives great charm to this naïve romance, the names of the characters are quaint even in translation, and the pictures of feudal Japan are vivid and fascinating. The Japanese atmosphere pervades the entire book."

== Sources ==
- Tamenaga, Shunsui (1880). The Loyal Ronins: An Historical Romance. Translated by Saito, Shiuichiro; Greey, Edward. New York, NY: G. P. Putnam's Sons.
- "Short Notes". The Oshkosh Daily Northwestern. October 29, 1880. p. 4, col. 1.
- "The 47 Rônin are Introduced to the World". Columbia University. Retrieved 20 June 2023.

Attribution:

- Keller, Helen Rex (1917). "Loyal Ronins, The". The Reader's Digest of Books. The Library of the World's Best Literature. New York, NY: The Macmillan Company. p. 524.
