= The Reincarnation of Golden Lotus =

1989 Hong Kong film by Clara Law

- Film poster
- Traditional Chinese: 潘金蓮之前世今生
- Simplified Chinese: 潘金莲之前世今生
- Hanyu Pinyin: Pān Jīnlián zhī Qiánshìjīnshēng
- Directed by: Clara Law
- Written by: Lilian Lee
- Produced by: Teddy Robin
- Starring: Joey Wong; Eric Tsang; Wilson Lam; Pal Sinn; Ku Feng
- Cinematography: Jingle Ma
- Edited by: Jin Ma
- Music by: Wei Peng; Lu Shijie
- Production companies: Youhe Film Production Co., Ltd; Jiafeng Film Co., Ltd.
- Distributed by: Orange Sky Golden Harvest
- Release date: 8 September 1989
- Running time: 99 minutes
- Country: Hong Kong
- Languages: Cantonese; Mandarin
- Box office: HK$8,160,911.00

The Reincarnation of Golden Lotus (Chinese: 潘金蓮之前世今生) is a 1989 Hong Kong film directed by Clara Law and produced by Teddy Robin, and written by Lilian Lee. The film stars Joey Wong, Eric Tsang, Wilson Lam, Pal Sinn, and Ku Feng. The film premiered in Taiwan on 4 August 1989.

== Plot ==
During the Song dynasty, Pan Jinlian was beheaded by the warder, she is reborn into the body of a baby girl named Shan Yulian, in Shanghai, after the Chinese Communist Revolution.

The war orphaned Shan Yulian at an early age. She graduated from Shanghai Arts School, majoring in Ballet.

In 1966, Mao Zedong launched the Cultural Revolution, Shan Yulian was brought to be persecuted and suffered political persecution by the CPC Government, she was raped by the President of Shanghai Dance Troupe. During the Down to the Countryside Movement, Shan Yulian was sent to the May Seventh Cadre Schools to work, she married a stupid farmer Wu Da, but she falls in love with Wu Da's brother, Wu Long, at the same time, Simon, who is a local playboy start to pursue her, and she falls into a love triangle with Wu Long and Simon.

== Cast ==
- Joey Wong as Pan Jinlian/ Shan Yulian
- Eric Tsang as Wu Da
- Wilson Lam as Wu Long
- Pal Sinn as Simon
- Ku Feng

== Release ==
The film was first released in Taiwan on 4 August 1989, and it was given a wider release on 16 February 1990.

The film was screened at the Toronto Festival of Festivals.

The film grossed $8,160,911.00 million.

== Award ==
Year	Work	Award	Result	Notes
1990	The Reincarnation of Golden Lotus	Hong Kong Film Award for Best New Performer – Pal Sinn	Nominated	
