= Ninjōbon =

The ninjōbon (人情本) is a pre-modern Japanese literary genre. Founded and developed in the early nineteenth century, this style of books derived from the early sharebon and kokkeibon genres and is a subgenre of gesaku. Ninjōbon was one of many genres in the Edo period of Japanese literature. Coming from the genre of “books of manners”, ninjōbon works were commonly referred to as “sentimental books”. A big difference between these “sentimental books”, often referred to as “weeping books”, and their predecessors –books of manners – ninjōbon focused more on erotic relationships and featured illustrations and vibrant covers. This style of novels focused on young love and were generally aimed to attract female readers; some common plot points and themes were love, suicide, relationships, family, etc. According to the book, An Edo Anthology, “’Sentimental books’ became the first full-fledged realistic novels complete with descriptive passages” (Jones and Watanabe, 2013).

== Developments ==
Although little information is available about the first ninjobon, the ninjōbon genre begins around 1819 with Akegarasu Nochi no Masayume (明烏後正夢) by Ryūtei Rijō and Seidan Mine Hatsuhana (清談峰初花) by Jippensha Ikku as early examples of the genre.

The genre reached its peak in the 1830s. Much of this was due to works of Tamenaga Shunsui beginning with Shunshoku Umegoyomi (春色梅児誉美) in 1832. Shunshokuj Umegoyomi, or Imitations of Spring: The Plum Calendar had four parts, each containing twelve volumes. These volumes were divided into twenty-four scenes. The Plum Calendar is known as “the most representative of works in the late Edo genre of ninjobon” (Jones and Watanabe, 2013). In The Plum Calendar, readers will see a sensitive and emotionally weak man, which is common in most ninjobon. “The heronines of The Plum Calendar fulfill the dictates of the Confucian feminine ideal, living only for and through their man without seeking additional sexual partners,” (Jones and Watanabe, 2013). This was followed by a number of books in the Umegoyomi series.

However, the popularity of the genre came to abrupt end in 1842 with the introduction of the Tenpō reforms. Led by Mizuno Tadakuni, in an attempt to bring the early Japanese military, economic, and religious systems to what they were supposed to be, according to the Tokugawa Shogunate. The Shogunate wanted to maintain control over commoners. After this, Tamenaga was manacled for 50 days. Due to the Shogunate believing that most works of art and literature were inappropriate for their goals at the time, many genres of books including Ninjōbon were confiscated and/or censored, and burned, and fewer books in the genre were published following this time. With common life becoming something overwhelming, many people turned to literature as a way to twist their mundane lines into humorous portrayals, so although the shogunate attempted to get rid of literature’s influence, it became even more popular as a way to escape.

Ninjōbon continued to be published until the early Meiji period.

Readers of modern Japanese literature can still find themes popular from this time period. Visions of love, relationships, suicide, and sex are all still present in modern literature and film.

== Major works ==
- Akegarasu Nochi no Masayume (明烏後の正夢, After the Morning Crow, a True Dream) (1819), Ryūtei Rijō
- Seidan Mine Hatsuhana (清談峰初花) (1819), Jippensha Ikku
- Onna Imagawa (婦女今川) (1826), Tamenaga Shunsui
- Kanamajiri Musume Setsuyō (仮名文章娘節用) (1831), Kyokusanjin
- Shunshoku Umegoyomi (春色梅児誉美, Colors of Spring: The Plum Calendar) (1832–1833), Tamenaga Shunsui
- Shunshoku Umemibune (春色梅美婦禰) (1841–1842)
- Temariuta Sannin Musume (毬唄三人娘) (1862–1865), Shōtei Kinsui
- Shunshoku Edomurasaki (春色江戸紫) (1864), Sansantei Arindo
