= Edward Greey =

Edward Greey (1835–1888) was an English-American author and a dealer in Japanese and Chinese art ware.

== Life ==
Edward Greey was born in Sandwich, Kent, England, on December 1, 1835. He was educated by private tutors, was a member of the English naval expedition to Japan in 1855–6, spent six years on station and shore duty, and learned the language and studied the history of that country. He came to the United States in 1868, was naturalized, and engaged in commercial pursuits in New York. He committed suicide, shooting himself in the head with a pistol in his New York residence on October 1, 1888.

== Works ==
He was the author of the following plays: Vendome, Mirah, The Third Estate, The College Belles, and Uncle Abner, and of the following works on Japanese history: Blue Jackets (1871); Loyal Ronins (New York, 1880); Young Americans in Japan (Boston, 1881); The Wonderful City of Tokio (1882); The Golden Lotus (1883); Bear-Worshippers of Yezo (1884); and A Captive of Love (1885). He was a member of the Zoological and Anthropological societies of London.

== Sources ==
- "Suicide of Edward Greey". The New York Times. October 2, 1888. p. 8.

Attribution:

- Wilson, James Grant; Fiske, John, eds. (1888). "Greey, Edward". Appletons' Cyclopædia of American Biography. Vol. 2. New York: D. Appleton & Co. p. 758.
