= Jingyang Ridge =

Coordinates: 36°5′18.78″N 115°59′9.24″E

Jingyang Ridge (simplified Chinese: 景陽岗; traditional Chinese: 景陽崗; pinyin: Jǐngyáng Gāng) is a place in Yanggu County (Chinese: 阳谷县; pinyin: Yánggǔ Xiàn), Shandong Province, China, that is referred to in the classic novel Water Margin as the place where one of the novel's heroes, Wu Song, killed a man-eating tiger with his bare hands. Jingyang Ridge is located a few kilometers northwest of Zhangqiu village (Chinese: 张秋镇; pinyin: Zhāngqiū Zhèn). It is a designated scenic area that protects a hill-top temple and several monuments related to the story of Wu Song. Historical buildings and monuments in the scenic area include:

- "Place of Wu Song hitting the tiger" (Chinese: 武松打虎处; pinyin: Wǔ Sōng Dá Hǔ Chù)
- Wu Song Shrine (Chinese: 武松庙; pinyin: Wǔ Sōng Miào)
- Mountain God Shrine (Chinese: 山神庙; pinyin: Shān Shén Miào)
- Roaring Tiger Pavilion (Chinese: 虎啸亭; pinyin: Hǔ Xiào Tíng).
