= An American Girl: McKenna Shoots for the Stars =

- DVD cover
- Directed by: Vince Marcello
- Screenplay by: Jessica O'Toole; Amy Rardin
- Based on: McKenna by Mary Casanova
- Starring: Jade Pettyjohn; Ysa Penarejo; Nia Vardalos; Ian Ziering; Cathy Rigby; Kerris Dorsey; George Chiang
- Music by: Tim Wynn
- Production companies: Universal Studios; Martin Chase Productions; Original Pictures
- Distributed by: Universal Pictures Home Entertainment
- Release date: July 3, 2012
- Running time: 93 minutes
- Country: United States
- Language: English

An American Girl: McKenna Shoots for the Stars (released in PAL territories as American Girl: Shooting for the Stars) is a 2012 American family drama film starring actress Jade Pettyjohn, Ysa Penarejo, Cathy Rigby, Nia Vardalos, and Ian Ziering. This film is based on the McKenna books in the American Girl series written by Mary Casanova. The film is also the second in the series to feature a Girl of the Year character, the first being Chrissa Stands Strong, and is the sixth film in the American Girl series overall.

The film is about the life of McKenna Brooks, as she struggles to balance her time at school and in her career as a gymnast. The screenplay was written by Jessica O'Toole and Amy Rardin. The movie was directed by Vince Marcello.

== Plot ==
Nine-year-old McKenna Brooks competes for Shooting Star gymnastics alongside her best friend Toulane Thomas. They both dream of competing in the 2016 Olympics. For now, their goal is to make the regional competitive team. McKenna practices back handspring dismounts for her balance beam routine. However, her coach Isabelle Manning tells her that the move is too advanced for her and she should stick to the easier dismount for now. McKenna and Toulane discuss the new girl Sierra and a girl from another team who is guaranteed to get one of the three spots on the team.

After practice, McKenna learns from her parents that her grades are slipping and Mr. Wu, her teacher, recommends she get a middle school reading tutor. McKenna's parents believe that she's spending too much time on gymnastics and not enough on school. McKenna refuses a tutor and promises to bring her grades up as there's going to be a science quiz the next day. She starts to read the science book, but doesn't understand it and quits.

The next day at school, McKenna struggles during the quiz and ends up cheating off of Sierra's paper, but gets caught by Mr. Wu and is given a zero. McKenna's parents then give her an ultimatum to either meet with a tutor or quit gymnastics. The next day, McKenna meets her tutor Josie Myers, who uses a wheelchair, at the school's library. McKenna hides from Sierra to avoid embarrassment. After showing little progress in reading comprehension, McKenna is angry when Josie tries to make her read "baby books". She asks Mr. Wu to find her a new tutor. McKenna tries three different tutors who won't work for her, and Mr. Wu makes her go back to Josie.

At a presentation run, the Shooting Stars gymnastics team perform for the parents. McKenna performs her beam routine and disobeys her coach by doing the back handsprings, but falls and breaks her ankle. McKenna is ruled out for eight weeks but is allowed to do exercises that don't involve her foot two weeks later. Her parents suggest this gives her an opportunity to focus on her schoolwork, but McKenna gets upset and fears giving up her dream to make the team.

The next time McKenna meets with Josie, she spends their session trying to hide from Sierra again but is caught and ends up setting off the fire alarm, much to Josie's disappointment. However, Sierra reveals she had a tutor once too and promises to keep McKenna's secret. Feeling assured, McKenna apologizes to Josie and takes the tutoring seriously. They start to develop a friendship and McKenna encourages Josie to find a way to ride a horse that will accommodate her disability. McKenna's mother also assures her that it's okay needing help with finding balance. One day, a suspicious Toulane spies on McKenna and discovers the tutoring sessions. She's hurt that McKenna lied to her for so long. The Brooks invite the Myers on their annual camping trip while Toulane refuses to come. While sharing a tent, McKenna reveals to Josie Toulane's struggles with living up to her mother's expectations.

McKenna is excited when she's able to understand A Little Princess while reading it. Josie admits McKenna inspired her and she found a program that allows kids with disabilities to ride horses. Josie invites McKenna to go but she refuses, remembering she gets her cast off the same day. They have an argument and Josie leaves, hurt. However, McKenna changes her mind and decides to support Josie. There, she runs into Toulane, who Josie invited too. They make up when McKenna apologizes and assures Toulane she still cares about gymnastics. Later, Mr. Wu. assigns his class a book report towards the end of the year that involves a presentation the day after the qualifying meet. McKenna begins to feel a lot of pressure. With the qualifying meet three weeks away, she is cleared but becomes nervous and struggles with her dismount (the skill she was injured on). McKenna decides to do her presentation on a book about athletes and becomes intrigued learning about them.

At the regional competitive team's qualifying meet, McKenna finds a worn out Toulane in the bathrooms. She admits to McKenna that she's sick of competitive gymnastics ever since her mother pushed her into it so that Toulane can follow in the footsteps of her older sister, a star gymnast. Toulane reveals she has been watching the rhythmic gymnastics practices and wishes she could do that instead, as she used to be a dancer. McKenna convinces Toulane to talk with her mother after the meet. They successfully perform their routines and Toulane even supports Sierra. At the end of her beam routine, McKenna hesitates on the dismount, but after remembering what she told Josie, she goes for it and sticks the landing.

McKenna and Toulane are among the top finishers for the regional competitive team, but Toulane finally confronts her mother and is allowed to switch to rhythmic gymnastics. She gives her place on the competitive team to a much-improved Sierra, who was named first alternate. In the end, McKenna gives her book report presentation on the importance of balance for professional athletes and how no one can achieve greatness without help from others. Everyone applauds and McKenna hugs Toulane and Josie.

== Cast ==
- Jade Pettyjohn as McKenna Brooks, the 9-year-old protagonist of the movie who has a passion for gymnastics. (Kathryn White was Jade's gymnast double)
- Ysa Penarejo as Toulane Thomas, McKenna's best friend who even though she does gymnastics, doesn't enjoy it.
- Kally Berard as Sierra Kuchinko, the new girl in both McKenna's class and gymnastics team. She moved to Seattle from California after her parents got divorced.
- Kerris Dorsey as Josefina "Josie" Myers, McKenna's tutor and close friend who is disabled.
- Ian Ziering as Mr. Brooks, McKenna's father who is a high school principal.
- Nia Vardalos as Mrs. Brooks, McKenna's mother who owns a coffee shop.
- Talia Pura as McKenna's maternal grandmother who lives with McKenna's family.
- Will Woytowich as Bob
- Paula Rivera as Mrs. Thomas, Toulane's mother who is very strict when it comes to making the Regional Competitive Team.
- George Chiang as Mr. Wu, McKenna and Toulane's schoolteacher.
- Aisha Alfa as Gymnastics Competition Announcer
- Abbey Thickson as Impatient Female Tutor
- Emma Leipsic as Megan Murphy, a gymnast from Performance Plus Gymnastics
- Rosie as Snowflake the horse, Josie's assigned horse she rode at Heart's and Horses
- Cathy Rigby as Coach Isabelle Manning, McKenna's strict, but caring gymnastics coach.
- Kadence Kendall Roach as Maisey Brooks, McKenna's 5-year-old sister and Mara's twin sister who also does gymnastics.
- Paiten Raine Roach as Mara Brooks, McKenna's 5-year-old sister and Maisey's twin sister who also does gymnastics.

== Production ==
An American Girl: McKenna Shoots for the Stars was filmed in Riverbend Community School, Winnipeg, Manitoba, Canada.

It also featured Superchicks 2008 song Rock What You Got.

== Release ==
The film was released on DVD and Blu-ray on July 3, 2012. It was initially only available at American Girl and Wal-Mart, but was eventually released in PAL territories as American Girl: Shooting for the Stars. The film aired on NBC on July 14, 2012.

A free screening of the film was held at the Tysons Corner Marriott on July 21, 2012, as part of a promotional package by American Girl and Marriott.
