= Cathy Rigby =

American gymnast and actress (b. 1952)

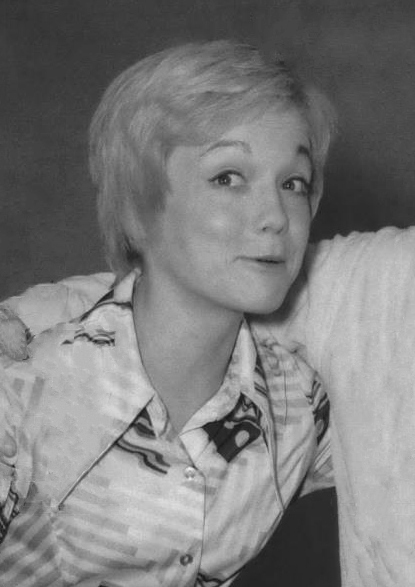
- Rigby in 1974

Personal information
- Born: Cathleen Roxanne Rigby; December 12, 1952 (age 73) Long Beach, California, U.S.
- Height: 149 cm (4 ft 11 in)
- Spouse(s): Tommy Mason (m. 1972; div. 1981) Tom McCoy (m. 1982)

Sport
- Sport: Artistic gymnastics
Medal record
Representing United States
World Championships
Silver medal – second place	1970 Ljubljana	Balance beam

Cathleen Roxanne Rigby (later Mason, later McCoy; born December 12, 1952), known as Cathy Rigby, is an actress, speaker, and former artistic gymnast. Her performance in the 1968 Summer Olympics helped to popularize the sport of gymnastics in the United States.

After her retirement from gymnastics, Rigby became a stage and television actress. She is most noted for the role of Peter Pan, which she played for more than 30 years. She also became a public speaker on the subject of eating disorder, which she struggled with and overcame.

Rigby is featured in an image included on the Voyager Golden Record.

== Gymnastics career ==
Rigby was the highest-scoring American gymnast at the 1968 Summer Olympics in Mexico City, making her a favorite with American television audiences and helping to popularize gymnastics in America. She was the U.S. national champion in 1970 and 1972, and she became the first American woman to win a medal at the World Artistic Gymnastics Championships: the silver medal on the balance beam at the 1970 World Artistic Gymnastics Championships.

Rigby competed in the 1972 Summer Olympics but was hampered by injury. Prior to the Games, she had been working on a "front aerial walkover"—a balance-beam skill that was quite risky for the time—but, because she was injured, she did not attempt this move during the competition, and she did not win a medal. She retired from gymnastics after the 1972 Olympics.

== Acting career ==
In 1974, the producers of a theater-in-the-round version of Peter Pan offered Rigby the title role. Rigby commented that she was "scared to death" during rehearsals; only 20 and just a year into "retirement," she had no idea what she would be doing with the rest of her life when the role came along. To her surprise, she discovered that she enjoyed playing Peter Pan.

In the mid-1970s, Rigby shattered an old taboo by appearing in a series of TV commercials for Stayfree maxi pads, thereby becoming the first celebrity to endorse a menstrual hygiene product. She then worked for 18 years as a commentator for ABC Sports and appeared in made-for-television movies. In 1976, she guest-starred as a Russian gymnast on the TV series The Six Million Dollar Man.

In 1981, she starred as Dorothy in a production of The Wonderful Wizard of Oz. Other theatrical appearances included Annie Get Your Gun and Meet Me in St. Louis.

In 1990, Rigby again appeared as Peter Pan on Broadway and later took the production on tour. She received excellent reviews for her performance and was nominated for a Tony Award. She played the role again in 1998–1999. In 2002–2003, she played the Cat in the Hat in the touring production of the musical Seussical and, in 2004–2005, she again toured as Peter Pan, billing it as her farewell. Yet she returned to the role in 2008 at the Benedum Center in Pittsburgh, and in 2009 at the Mansion Theater in Branson, Missouri.

In August 2011, Rigby started another Peter Pan tour at the age of 60, continuing through 2013. In 2012, she appeared in American Girl's An American Girl: McKenna Shoots for The Stars, as McKenna's gymnastics coach. Rigby confirmed that she was leaving the role of Peter Pan for good when her tour concluded on April 28, 2013. She said, "No, we don't say goodbye, because saying goodbye means forgetting, and I'm not forgetting, I'm just going to find another adventure."

In late August 2015, Rigby reprised her role as Peter Pan in a limited 15-day run at the Pacific National Exhibition in Vancouver.

== Personal life ==
After retiring from gymnastics, Rigby married professional football player Tommy Mason in 1972, with whom she had two sons. She and Mason divorced in 1981. While acting in The Wizard of Oz, she met her second husband, Tom McCoy, whom she credited with helping her fight bulimia nervosa. She and McCoy had two daughters, Theresa and Kaitlin.

During the 1980s, she began speaking publicly about her experiences with eating disorders. She suffered from bulimia for 12 years and wrote in an article for People in 1984: "I wanted to be perfect in my attitude and in my weight. Inside I was going crazy. I probably consumed 10,000 calories a day or more in fast foods. I can tell you where every McDonald's and Jack in the Box was along the way (to my voice lessons)—and every bathroom where I could get rid of the food." According to a People interview in 1991, "twice she was hospitalized and nearly died from electrolyte imbalance."

== Awards and honors ==
- A multiple-exposure image of Rigby on the balance beam was included on the Voyager Golden Record as an example of the range of human motion.
- In 1979, the supersisters trading card set was produced and distributed; one of the cards featured Rigby's name and picture.
- Rigby was nominated for a Tony Award for Best Actress in a Musical for her 1990–91 performance as Peter Pan.
- In 1998, Rigby was inducted into the International Gymnastics Hall of Fame.
- In 1999, the production of Peter Pan, of which Rigby was a member, was nominated for the Tony Award for Best Revival of a Musical.
- In 2004, Rigby received a Distinguished Lifetime Service Award from The Broadway League.
