= The Golden Lotus, and Other Legends of Japan =

1883 collection of Japanese legends

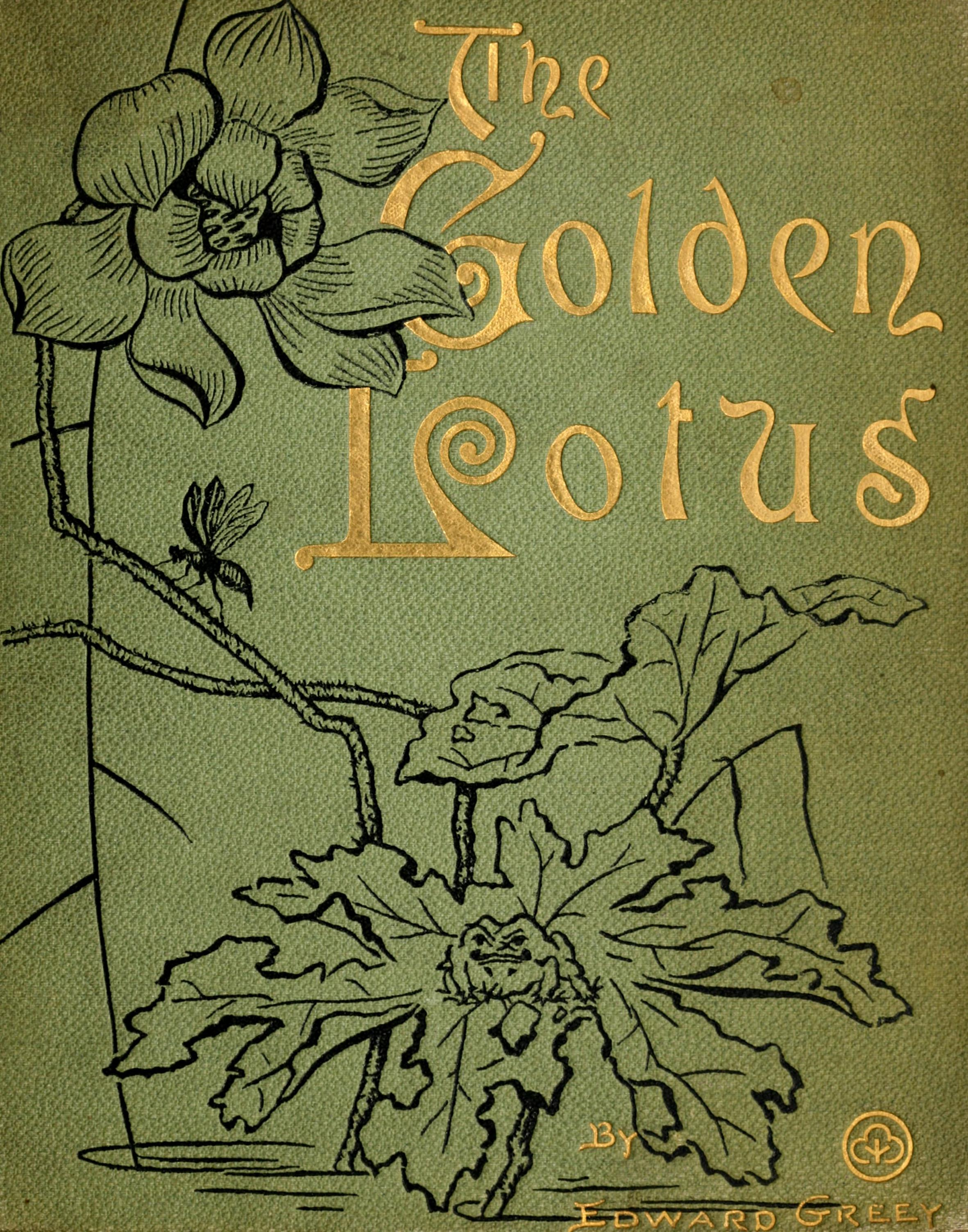
Cover Designed and Drawn by the Author, Edward Greey

The Golden Lotus, and Other Legends of Japan is the title of an 1883 collection of Japanese legends intended for older children, of which Edward Greey was the author-translator and Lea & Shepard, Boston, were the original publishers. The contents embrace the "Legend of the Golden Lotus"; "The Toad of Tomioka"; "The Hanashika"; "The Legend of Lu-wen, the Wood-cutter"; "A Japanese Delicacy"; "A Legend of the Rain"; "Street Scenes in Tokio"; "A Visit to a Japanese Theatre"; "Legend of the God-Fox"; "No Gaku", and "Shinda Usagi-uma".

== Sources ==
- "New Books". The Nashville Banner. January 17, 1883. p. 2, col. 3.
