= Tamenaga Shunsui =

Tamenaga Shunsui (為永 春水, 1790 – 11 February 1844) was the pen name of Sasaki Sadataka (佐々木貞高), a Japanese novelist of the Edo period.

== Works ==
In Japan, he is best known for the romantic novel Shunshoku Umegoyomi (春色梅児誉美, Colors of Spring: The Plum Calendar) (1832–1833), the representative text in the ninjōbon genre. He followed up to this with sequels and his son, who called himself Shunsui Tamenaga Junior, continued the series. In Japan, he is considered a major writer of the Edo period, remembered for disobeying the Tenpō Reforms. He also wrote a version of the Chūshingura called "Iroha Bunko".

In Western literature, he is probably better known for his humorous story Longevity, which was translated by Yei Theodora Ozaki for her book Japanese Fairy Tales in 1903, and since then has been reprinted in some children's Asian fairy tale collections.

== See also ==
- The Loyal Ronins

== Sources ==
- The 47 Rônin are Introduced to the World
