= George Chiang =

Canadian writer, composer, producer, and actor

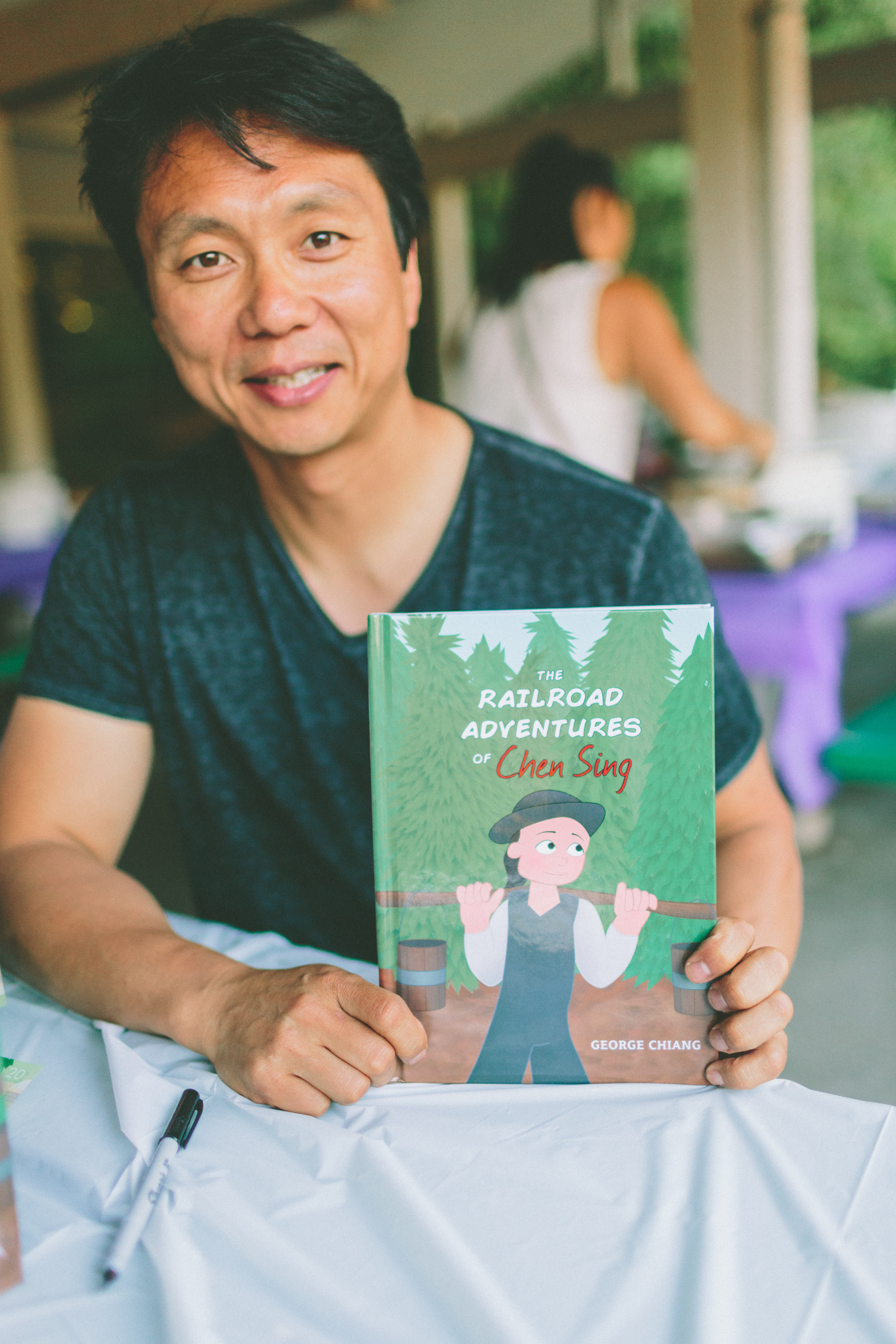
- Chiang at the Chen Sing Annual Family Reunion and Picnic on July 30, 2017 at Stanley Park in Vancouver, Canada
- Born: Ottawa, Ontario, Canada
- Education: University of Guelph
- Occupations: Actor, writer, lyricist, composer
- Awards: Full list

George Chiang is a Canadian writer, composer, producer, and actor.

== Acting ==
Chiang has performed at theaters across Canada. He received critical praise for his performances in David Henry Hwang's, The Dance and the Railroad at the Tarragon Theatre, Serpent Kills (Crow'sTheatre/Factory Theatre), Urban Donnelleys (Theatre Passe Muraille), which he co-created, and as the Kralaholme in The King and I (Huron Country Playhouse).

He spent two seasons at Canada's Stratford Festival, where he first appeared in Othello, and Twelfth Night. He also originated the role of Zhu Xu in the world premiere of Salesman in China earning critical acclaim

Chiang has also appeared in film and television productions including Disney's Eloise at the Plaza, American Girl's McKenna Shoots for the Stars, Mary Kills People, and Dark Matter, among others.
