= Wu Dalang =

Water Margin character

Wu Dalang (Chinese: 武大郎; pinyin: Wǔ Dàláng), also translated as Wu the Elder, is a major character in the classic Chinese novel The Plum in the Golden Vase, and a minor character in the Water Margin, another classic. In both novels, he is murdered by his adulterous wife Pan Jinlian. A well-known figure in Chinese culture, he represents the quintessential cuckold.

== Story ==
Wu Dalang is the elder brother of the hero Wu Song. Because he is short and ugly, he is nicknamed "Three-inch nail". In contrast, Wu Song is a strong and powerful warrior with good looks.

The brothers' parents died when they were young and Wu Dalang shouldered the responsibility of raising his younger brother. Wu Song once got into a fight and knocked out his opponent. He thought he had killed his opponent and fled to avoid arrest by the authorities. The brothers were later reunited after a long period of time.

Wu Dalang was married to Pan Jinlian and the two were known to be quite close in the early days of their marriage and neighbours usually referred to their marriage as "a rose placed atop a pile of cow dung". Eventually the couple could not stand it and moved to Yanggu County.

In Yanggu, Wu made a living by selling pancakes while his wife stayed at home and managed domestic affairs. By coincidence, the brothers were reunited in Yanggu after Wu Song had killed a tiger. The brothers lived together and were quite close. Pan Jinlian was attracted to the handsome Wu Song and tried to seduce him, but Wu Song shoved her away and left.

Once, the county magistrate sent Wu Song out for an errand which took two months. During that time, Pan Jinlian had an adulterous affair with Ximen Qing, which Wu Dalang did not know about. The adulterous pair were making love when Wu Dalang returned home and caught them in the act. Ximen Qing hit Wu Dalang so hard that Wu Dalang was injured and fell ill.

Pan Jinlian and Ximen Qing were worried that Wu Dalang might report their affair to Wu Song, who was serving as a head constable in the county office. Thus, they decided to finish Wu Dalang by poisoning his medicine. Wu Dalang drank the medicine and realised it was poison but was too late. He struggled but was eventually smothered with a pillow by his wife. Then, Ximen Qing had Wu Dalang's body cremated, and he tried to bribe the neighbours and the coroner to keep the affair a secret.

When Wu Song returned from his errand he was shocked to hear of his brother's death. He started an investigation, found out about the adulterous affair and reported it to the magistrate. However, the magistrate had been bribed and he dismissed the case citing lack of evidence. Eventually, Wu Song managed to force a confession from Pan Jinlian and he killed her to avenge his brother. What happened next differ in the two novels. In Water Margin, the older novel, Wu Song kills Ximen Qing in broad daylight and is exiled. In Jin Ping Mei, however, Ximen Qing escapes and bribes the county magistrate to have Wu Song arrested and exiled.
