= Wu Song =

Fictional character in the Chinese classical novel Water Margin

- Water Margin character
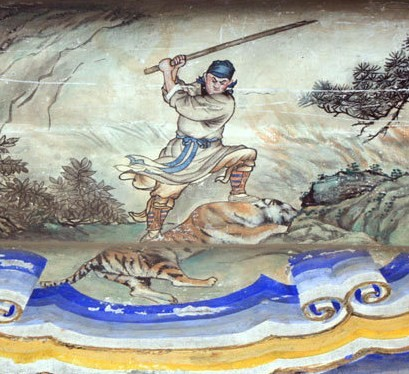
- a mural depicting Wu Song fighting the tiger at the Long Corridor in the Summer Palace, Beijing
- First appearance: Chapter 23

In-universe information
- Aliases: "Tiger-slaying Hero" 打虎英雄; Chief Wu 武都頭; Grandmaster Qingzhong 清忠祖師
- Nicknames: "Pilgrim" 行者
- Weapon: pair of broadswords, quarterstaff
- Origin: constable
- Designation: Infantry Commander of Liangshan
- Rank: 14th, Harm Star (天傷星) of the 36 Heavenly Spirits
- Ancestral home / Place of origin: Qinghe County, Hebei

Chinese names
- Other names: Second Brother Wu (武二郎)

Wu Song
- Chinese: 武松
Transcriptions
Standard Mandarin
- Hanyu Pinyin: Wǔ Sōng
- IPA: [ù sʊ́ŋ]
Yue: Cantonese
- Yale Romanization: Móuh Chùhng
- Jyutping: Mou^{5} Cung^{4}
- IPA: [mɔw˩˧ tsʰʊŋ˩]

Wu Song (武松 (Wǔ Sōng)), also known as Second Brother Wu (武二郎 (Wǔ Èrláng)), is a legendary folk hero recounted since the 13th century; and one of the well-known fictional characters in Water Margin, one of the Classic Chinese Novels.

Nicknamed "Pilgrim", (Note: 行者 literally translates to "Traveller". However, in Chinese Buddhist terminology, it refers to an untonsured Buddhist pilgrim following the dhūtaguṇa path, so Sidney Shapiro translated it as "Pilgrim".) he ranks 14th among the 36 Heavenly Spirits of the 108 Heroes. In folktales derived from the novel, Wu Song is a martial arts student of Zhou Tong, specialising in chuojiao. In the novel, he fights well with bang (quarterstaff) or a pair of broadswords.

== Attestations ==
Legends surrounding the heroic figure of Wu Song have existed since the late Song dynasty. A "Pilgrim Wu" (武行者) is briefly mentioned in the 13th-century collection Stories Told by an Old Drunkard (醉翁談錄) by Luo Ye (羅燁). The earliest record of a tale in which Wu Song fights a tiger comes from a zaju play written by a late-13th-century writer who wrote under the pen name "Red-Tattooed Second Li" (紅字二李), but the play itself is no longer extant. The oldest surviving Chinese drama version of the tiger-slaying episode is the chuanqi or "miraculous" play by Shen Jing (沈環, 1553-1610) dating to the late 16th century, and the earliest editions of Water Margin that contain the tiger-fighting story also date around the end of the 16th century.

== In Water Margin ==
=== Background ===
A native of Qinghe County, Hebei, Wu Song is described in Water Margin as a tall, good-looking and muscular man with shining eyes and thick eyebrows. As his parents died early, he was raised by his dwarf elder brother Wu Dalang (武大郎; literally "Wu the Older"), whom he respects and loves very much. Wu Song's nickname "Wu Erlang" (literally "Wu the Second") is a reference to him being the second son.

On one occasion, Wu Song gets into a drunken brawl and knocks a man unconscious. Thinking that he has killed the man, he flees from home and takes shelter in the residence of the nobleman Chai Jin. There, he meets Song Jiang, who is on the run from the law after killing his mistress Yan Poxi. They become sworn brothers.

=== Slaying the tiger ===
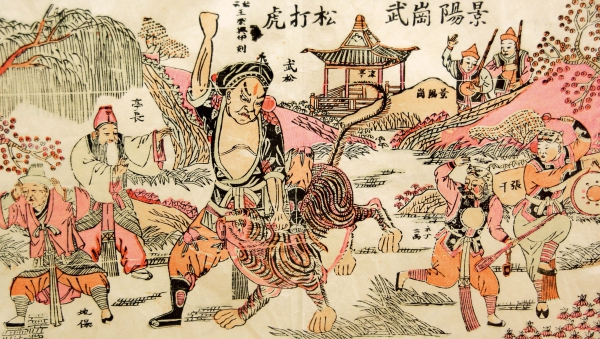
A late Qing dynasty New Year picture depicting Wu Song fighting the tiger on Jingyang Ridge

Upon learning that the man he knocked out is not dead, Wu Song heads home and passes by an inn near Jingyang Ridge where he sees a banner reading "After Three Bowls, Do Not Cross the Ridge" (三碗不過崗), and goes in for a break. The innkeeper explains that the inn's homebrewed alcoholic drink is so strong that customers usually get drunk after consuming three bowls and cannot cross the ridge ahead. Still sober after three bowls, Wu Song demands more. By the end of his meal, he has consumed 18 bowls but still looks steady. He is about to leave when the innkeeper stops him and warns him about a fierce tiger on the ridge. Wu Song suspects that the innkeeper is trying to scare him into spending the night at the inn. Ignoring the advice, he continues his journey, armed with only a quarterstaff.

As he approaches the ridge, Wu Song spots an official notice warning travellers about the tiger. To avoid losing face, he presses on and starts feeling the effects of alcohol, so he takes a nap on a large rock. As he is resting, the tiger leaps out of the woods and shocks him out of his stupor. After narrowly dodging the tiger's first three charges, Wu Song attempts to fight back but breaks his quarterstaff on a tree. Unarmed, he musters all his strength and manages to pin the tiger face down in a pit with his arms, raining blows on its head with his bare fists. After punching the tiger unconscious, he picks up his broken quarterstaff and keeps hitting the tiger until he is sure that it is dead. Exhausted, he leaves the spot after a short break and encounters some local hunters, who are amazed at his incredible feat. Impressed, the local magistrate of the nearby Yanggu County offers him the job of a chief constable. Wu Song accepts and settles in the county, where he unexpectedly meets his brother Wu Dalang, who has moved to Yanggu from Qinghe.

According to some narrations in Yangzhou storytelling, particularly the "Wang school", Wu Song's slaying of the tiger took place "in the middle of the tenth (lunar) month" of the "Xuanhe year [1119]".

=== Avenging his brother ===
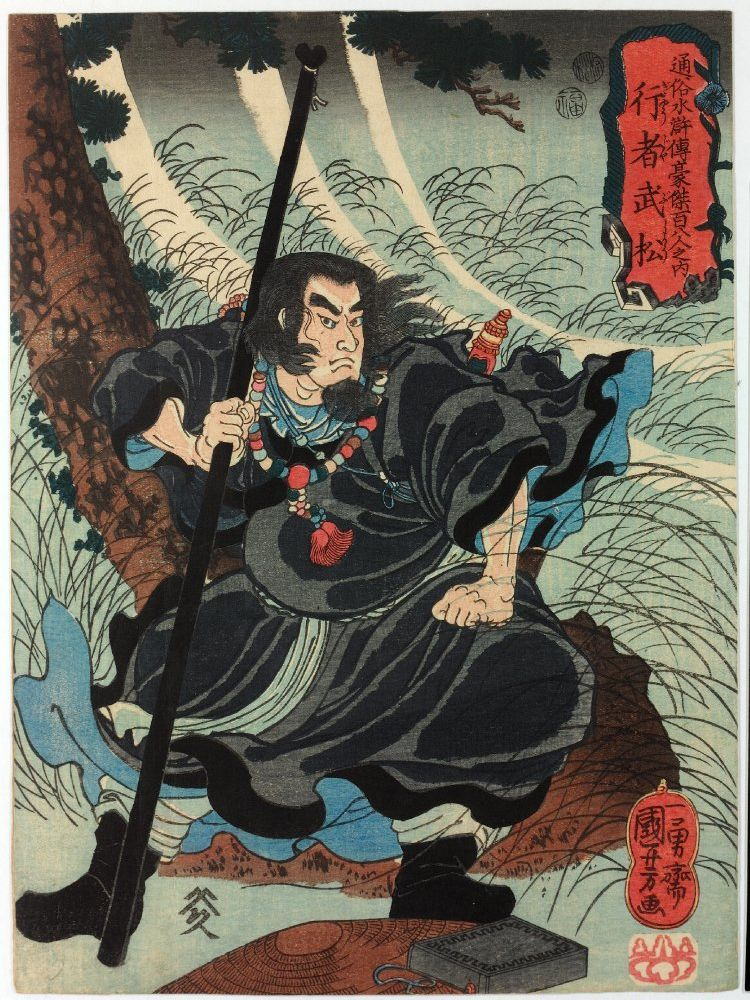
An illustration of Wu Song by Utagawa Kuniyoshi

Wu Dalang takes Wu Song home and introduces him to his wife Pan Jinlian, who was originally a rich man's servant and had been forced to marry Wu Dalang – the ugliest man in town – as punishment for resisting her master's sexual advances. Wu Song also learns that the couple has moved to Yanggu to avoid harassment by their neighbours back in Qinghe: they called Wu Dalang, who sold shaobing for a living, "Three-Inch Nail Tree Bark" (三寸丁谷樹皮) for his stature, and mocked him even more after his marriage as he looks starkly incompatible with his younger, pretty wife. After meeting Wu Song, Pan Jinlian is immediately attracted to her handsome, well-built brother-in-law, but Wu Song sternly spurns her attempt to seduce him.

The magistrate later sends Wu Song on an assignment to escort funds to the capital Dongjing (東京; present-day Kaifeng, Henan). When Wu Song returns home two months later, he is shocked to learn that his brother had died and his body had already been cremated. Not believing Pan Jinlian's account that Wu Dalang had succumbed to a sudden illness, Wu Song privately conducts an investigation and learns that Pan is having an affair with Ximen Qing, a wealthy gentry man who has seduced her with the help of the teahouse owner Granny Wang, who lives next door. Tipped off by their neighbours, Wu Dalang had caught his wife and Ximen Qing in bed together, but Ximen had kicked him so hard in the abdomen that it had left him bedridden. Later on, Ximen Qing, Pan Jinlian and Granny Wang had conspired to murder Wu Dalang by poisoning his medicine, and then Ximen had bribed the magistrate to close the case quickly and cremate the body. Wu Song finds the coroner, who had secretly kept a darkened bone as evidence of poisoning, and goes to the magistrate to plead his case, taking along with him some witnesses. However, the magistrate, having been bribed by Ximen Qing, dismisses Wu Song's plea on the grounds of insufficient evidence.

Denied legal avenue, Wu Song takes matters into his own hands. He invites their neighbours, including Granny Wang, to a belated wake for his brother. At the wake, he forces Pan Jinlian at knife-point to confess to the murder before decapitating and disembowelling her in front of everyone. Next, he makes the fear-stricken Granny Wang sign a confession in front of the witnesses. After that, he makes his way to Lion Restaurant (獅子樓) to confront Ximen Qing and kills him after a fight. Having avenged his brother, he goes to the county office to surrender himself.

As the locals are sympathetic to Wu Song, they plead for leniency on his behalf, so Wu Song gets spared the death penalty and ends up being sentenced to face-tattooing and exile in Mengzhou.

=== Meeting Sun Erniang and Zhang Qing ===
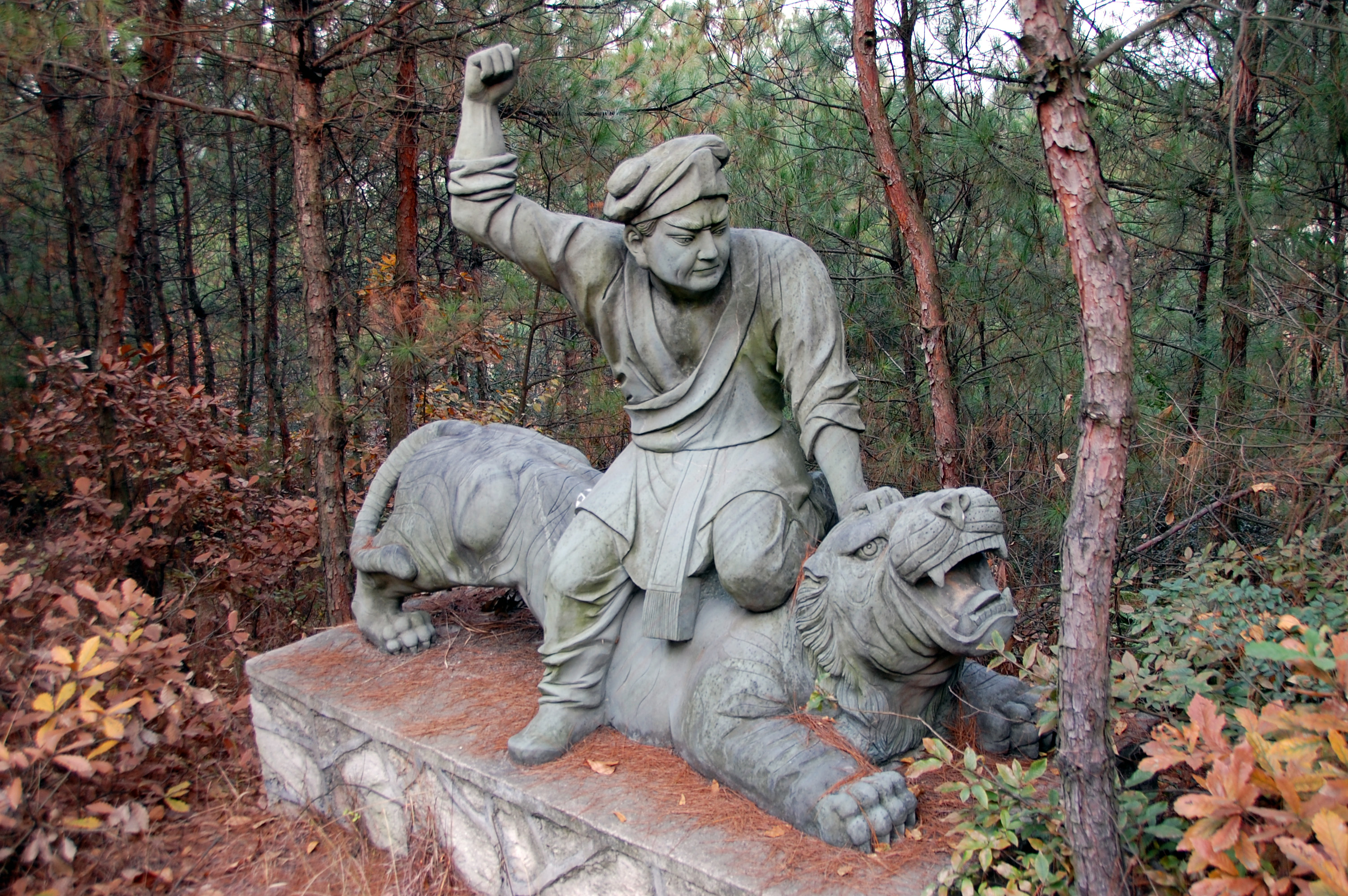
A stone statue of Wu Song at Hengdian World Studios.

On the way to Mengzhou, Wu Song and the two guards escorting him pass by Cross Slope (十字坡; in present-day Fan County, Henan), where they take a rest in Sun Erniang's inn. Wu Song senses that Sun Erniang is up to no good and suspects that the alcoholic drinks served to them have been spiked with menghanyao (蒙汗藥), a drug that causes unconsciousness. He pretends to be knocked out after consuming the drink. When Sun Erniang tries to lift him, he gets up and easily overpowers her in a fight. Sun Erniang's husband, Zhang Qing, comes home in time and stops the fight. Upon learning who he is, the couple apologises to Wu Song and treats him hospitably before seeing him off with his escorts to Mengzhou.

=== Life in Mengzhou ===
At the prison in Mengzhou, Wu Song meets the warden and learns that all inmates are subject to a mandatory flogging called "100 strokes of shaweibang" (殺威棒; "ego-killing staff") upon arrival. Just as he is about to be beaten, the warden's son Shi En speaks up and says that Wu Song looks pallid and might be ill, so the flogging is postponed. Over the next few days, Wu Song is surprisingly treated well in prison. He soon learns that Shi En is behind all this because he needs Wu Song's help in dealing with a hooligan called Jiang Zhong, nicknamed "Jiang the Door God". Shi En owns a restaurant called Happy Forest (快活林), which has been seized from him by Jiang Zhong.

Agreeing to help Shi En to repay his kindness, Wu Song goes to confront Jiang Zhong at Happy Forest. Along the way, he drinks three bowls of alcoholic drinks at every place which serves alcohol he comes across, and has already consumed an enormous amount of alcohol by the time he reaches Happy Forest. He provokes Jiang Zhong into a fight and soundly beats him with a set of martial arts moves called "Jade Circle Steps and Mandarin Ducks Kicks" (玉環步，鴛鴦腳). Jiang Zhong is forced to apologise to Shi En, give up Happy Forest, and leave Mengzhou for good.

A humiliated Jiang Zhong secretly conspires with two corrupt officials in Mengzhou – Instructor Zhang and Inspector Zhang – to take revenge. Inspector Zhang pretends to be impressed with Wu Song's physical prowess and asks the prison warden to let Wu Song stay in his residence. During this time, Wu Song is framed for larceny and gets thrown back into prison, after which he is exiled to another location. Shi En warns him of danger before seeing him off. Indeed, Jiang Zhong and the corrupt officials have bribed the guards escorting Wu Song to murder him along the way. At Flying Cloud Pool (飛雲浦), the guards and some assassins attack Wu Song, but he breaks free of the cangue and defeats and kills all of them. After that, he returns to Mengzhou to confront Jiang Zhong, Instructor Zhang and Inspector Zhang, who are having a party at Mandarin Ducks Tower (鴛鴦樓) to celebrate Wu Song's presumed death. Wu Song kills the three men and Inspector Zhang's entire family of 15, and signs off "The killer is Wu Song, the Tiger Slayer" on the wall before leaving.

=== Becoming an outlaw ===
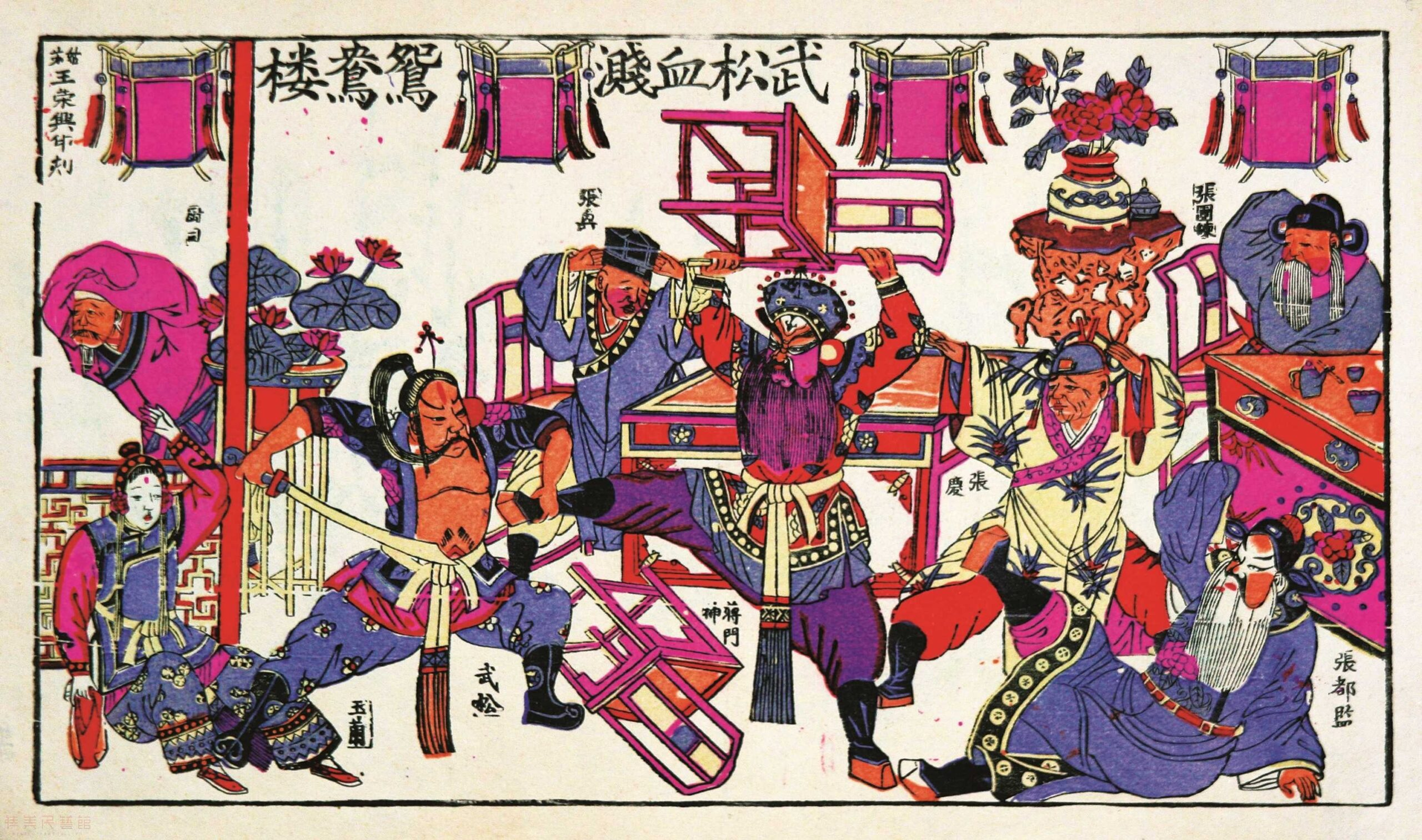
Wu Song sprinkles the Tower of Mandarin Ducks with blood (武松血濺鴛鴦樓), woodblock print, Qing dynasty

After fleeing Mengzhou, Wu Song heads to Cross Slope to find Sun Erniang and Zhang Qing, who advise him to take shelter with the outlaw band at Mount Twin Dragons (二龍山). The couple helps Wu Song disguise himself as an untonsured Buddhist pilgrim following the dhūtaguṇa path to avoid being recognised since the authorities have put up wanted notices with his portrait in the vicinity. Wu Song changes his appearance after putting on a Buddhist robe, necklace of skulls, and headband, and letting down his hair to conceal the convict tattoo on his face. He also obtains a pair of broadswords, and is henceforth nicknamed "Pilgrim".

En route, Wu Song encounters and kills a villainous Taoist priest nicknamed "Flying Centipede" and saves a kidnapped woman. Next, he passes by an inn and gets into a brawl with Kong Liang, beating up the latter. Kong Liang seeks help from his brother Kong Ming; the brothers ambush Wu Song when he is drunk, tie him to a tree, and beat him up in revenge. Luckily for Wu Song, he is recognised by Song Jiang, who happens to be staying with the Kong brothers then. The Kong brothers then release Wu Song, apologise to him, and they become friends.

Wu Song finally reaches Mount Twin Dragons and joins the outlaw band there led by Lu Zhishen and Yang Zhi. The outlaws from Mount Twin Dragons, including Wu Song, ultimately join the larger outlaw band at Liangshan Marsh following the battle of Qingzhou between government forces and the Liangshan outlaws.

=== Campaigns and retirement ===
Wu Song is appointed as a commander of the Liangshan infantry after the 108 Heroes are fully assembled. Among the 108 Heroes, he is one of the few who vehemently object to Song Jiang's grand plan of securing amnesty for the outlaws from the emperor and receiving an opportunity to serve the Song government. In his view, the government is so corrupt that the outlaws might as well fight injustice in their own way as opposed to aligning themselves with the government. Nevertheless, he grudgingly accepts the reality when Song Jiang's dream finally comes true: Emperor Huizong grants amnesty to the Liangshan outlaws, and sends them on campaigns against the Liao invaders and rebel forces within Song territory.

In the final campaign against Fang La's rebel forces, Wu Song fights Fang La's sorcerer Bao Daoyi at the battle of Muzhou (睦州; in present-day Hangzhou, Zhejiang). Bao Daoyi uses sorcery to control a flying sword and slices off Wu Song's left arm; Lu Zhishen rushes forth and saves Wu Song's life. By the time the campaign is over, only about a third of the 108 Heroes have survived.

Not wanting to join the survivors in returning to the capital to report their victory to the emperor, Wu Song chooses to remain in Hangzhou to take care of a dying Lin Chong. He then spends the rest of his life as a Buddhist recluse in the Liuhe Pagoda and dies peacefully at the age of 80.

== In Jin Ping Mei ==
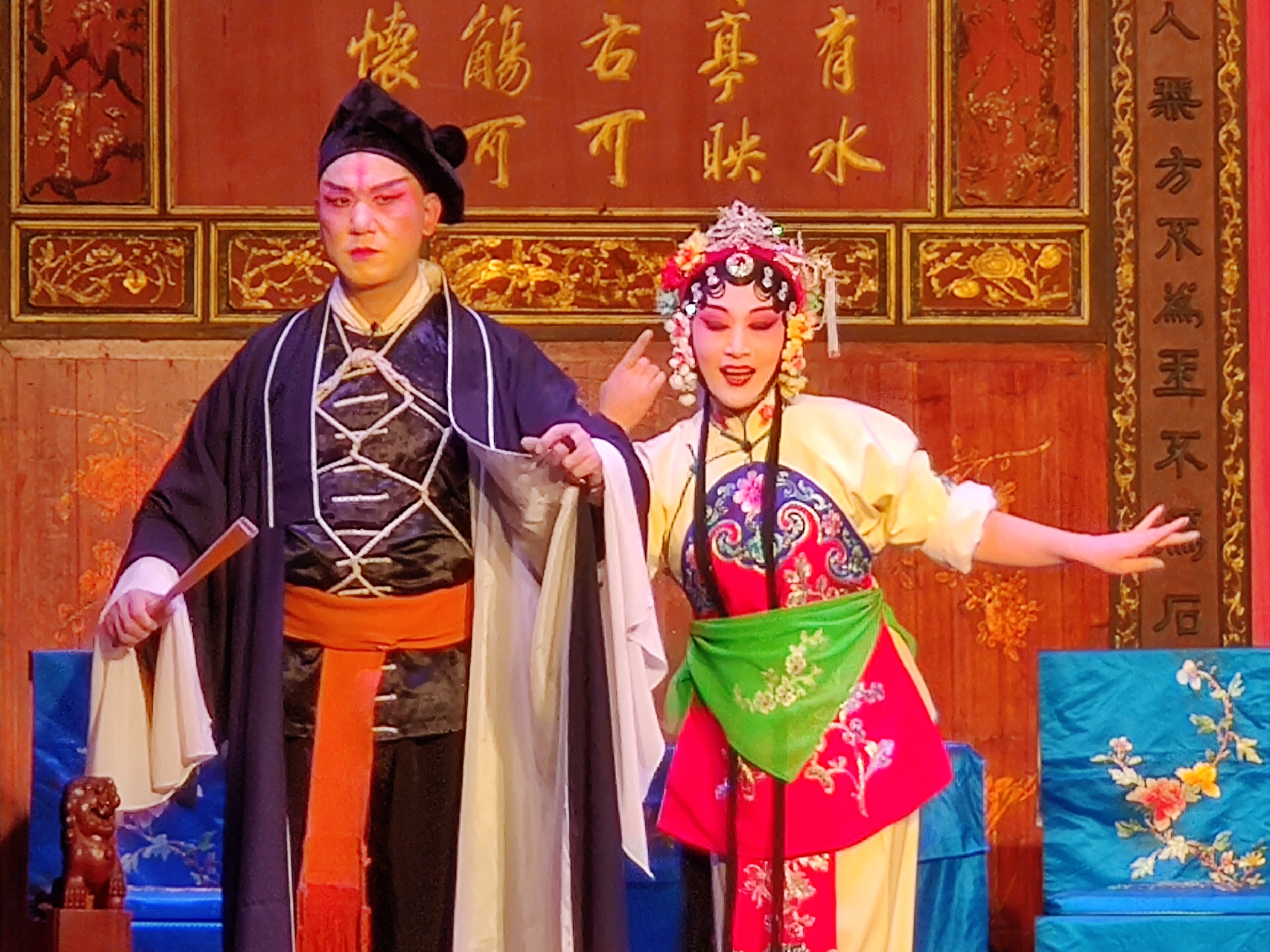
Pan Jinlian tries to seduce Wu Song by asking him to massage her eyes. From a Huaihai opera performance in Nanjing, 9 October 2019.

Wu Song is one of the main characters in the novel Jin Ping Mei, which roughly follows his story in Water Margin. After Pan Jinlian and Ximen Qing murder Wu Dalang, Wu Song seeks vengeance and tries to kill Ximen Qing, but ends up killing the wrong man. He gets sentenced to exile in Mengzhou, but returns later and learns that Ximen Qing has died of illness by then. He then kills Pan Jinlian and flees to Mount Twin Dragons to be an outlaw.

== Becoming Zhou Tong's student ==
The following tale, alternatively known as "Meeting Zhou Tong By Chance" and "Swordplay under the Moon", belongs to the "Wang School Shuihu" of Yangzhou storytelling. It serves as a spin-off story (書外書) which takes place in the same setting as Water Margin, but is independent of the main storyline. The tale takes place in Kaifeng when Wu Song has been tasked with escorting money there by the magistrate of Yanggu County. It explains how he learns swordsmanship from Zhou Tong.

Wu Song is exploring Kaifeng when there is a sudden downpour which ends as quickly as it started. While crossing a bridge and taking care not to step in the puddles, he brushes shoulders with an elderly man. Despite being a well-trained martial artist himself, he is caught off guard by the man's shoulder strike, which leaves him weak in the knees and numb on one side of his body. Realising he has met a formidable martial arts master, Wu Song remains silent instead of confronting the man. The man, who is actually Zhou Tong, had mistaken Wu Song for someone trying to challenge him, so he had channelled his neigong to his shoulder to perform the strike. Quietly impressed by the young man's restraint, Zhou Tong simply bows in apology and continues on his way.

That night, when Wu Song is practising shadowboxing under the moonlight, he overhears somebody practising martial arts and peers over a wall into the courtyard of the neighbouring mansion, where he sees the same elderly man wielding a pair of swords entertaining a group of socialites with his swordsmanship.

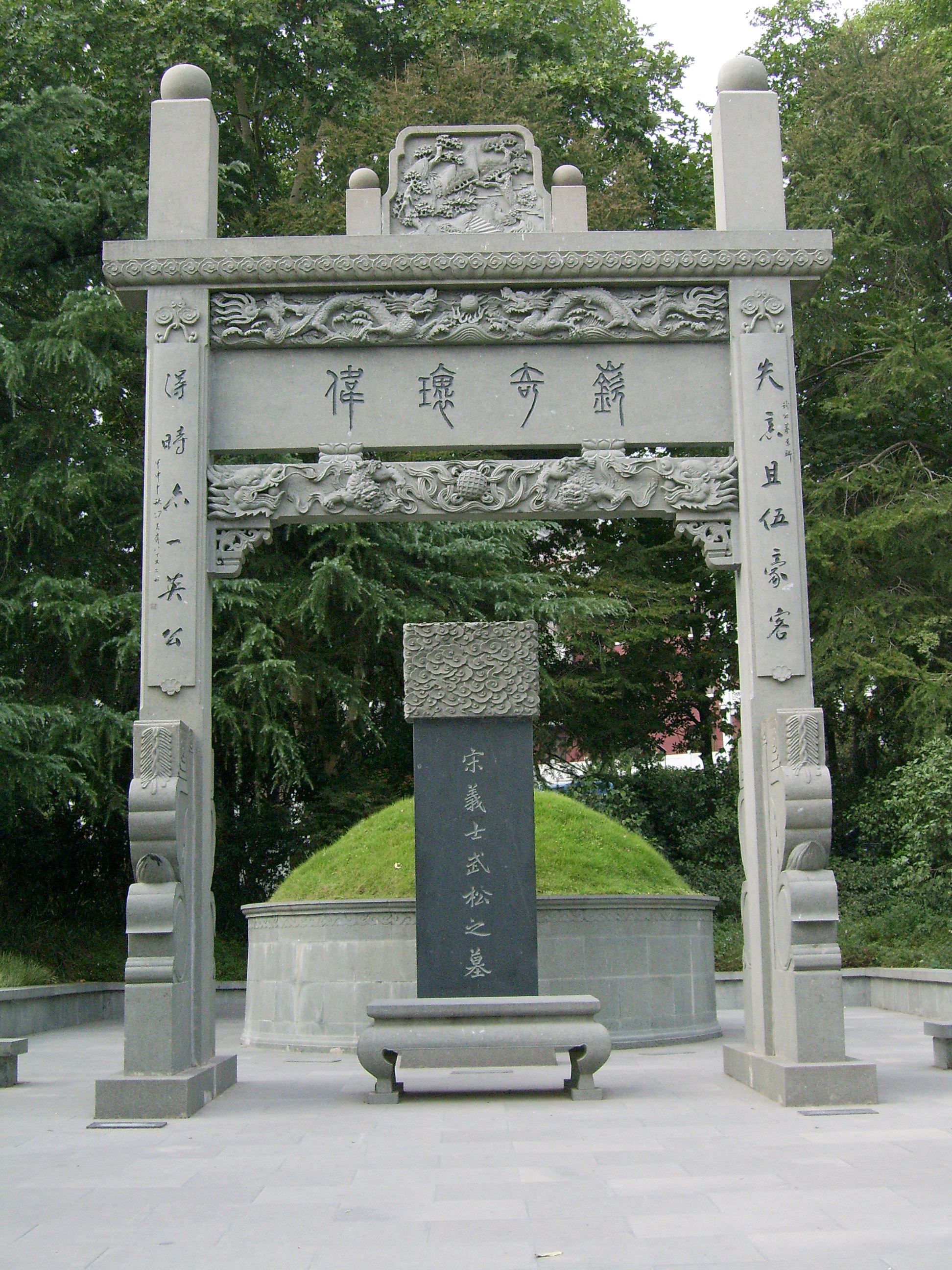
Wu Song's tomb

Intrigued, Wu Song soon realises that the elderly man also knows forms of drunken boxing that supposedly only two persons in the jianghu are trained in: Wu Song's master, and Zhou Tong. Wu Song is so impressed that he violates etiquette by shouting praises from the wall. Zhou Tong, interrupted before he finishes all the forms, looks up, spots Wu Song on the wall, and recognises the young man.

After they introduce themselves to each other, Zhou Tong is delighted to learn that the young man is the famous hero who bare-handedly killed a tiger at Jingyang Ridge while Wu Song is awed to hear that the elderly man is the famous master who has trained many jianghu heroes in military and civilian combat arts. After Wu Song begs Zhou Tong to take him as a student, the latter agrees and teaches him swordsmanship.

== In other media ==
Wu Song appears in a range of stage and screen adaptations of Water Margin, and has been discussed in performance studies and scholarship on Chinese masculinity.

=== Opera and stage performances ===
The tiger-slaying story commonly known as "Wu Song Fights the Tiger" (武松打虎) has circulated widely across Chinese performance traditions, and has been examined as a case of how a Water Margin story moves between oral storytelling and theatrical reworkings. Studies of Yangzhou storytelling also treat Wu Song's story as part of a longer repertory of heroic tales that continue to be performed and transmitted beyond the novel.

=== Film and television ===
Wu Song appears in multiple film and television adaptations of Water Margin.

In Hong Kong cinema, Ti Lung is known for his role as Wu Song in the 1972 Shaw Brothers Studio film The Delightful Forest, which focuses on Wu Song's story. Ti Lung also portrayed Wu Song in the Hong Kong films The Water Margin (1972) and Tiger Killer (1982);

In mainland China, Ding Haifeng portrayed Wu Song in the 1998 television series The Water Margin.

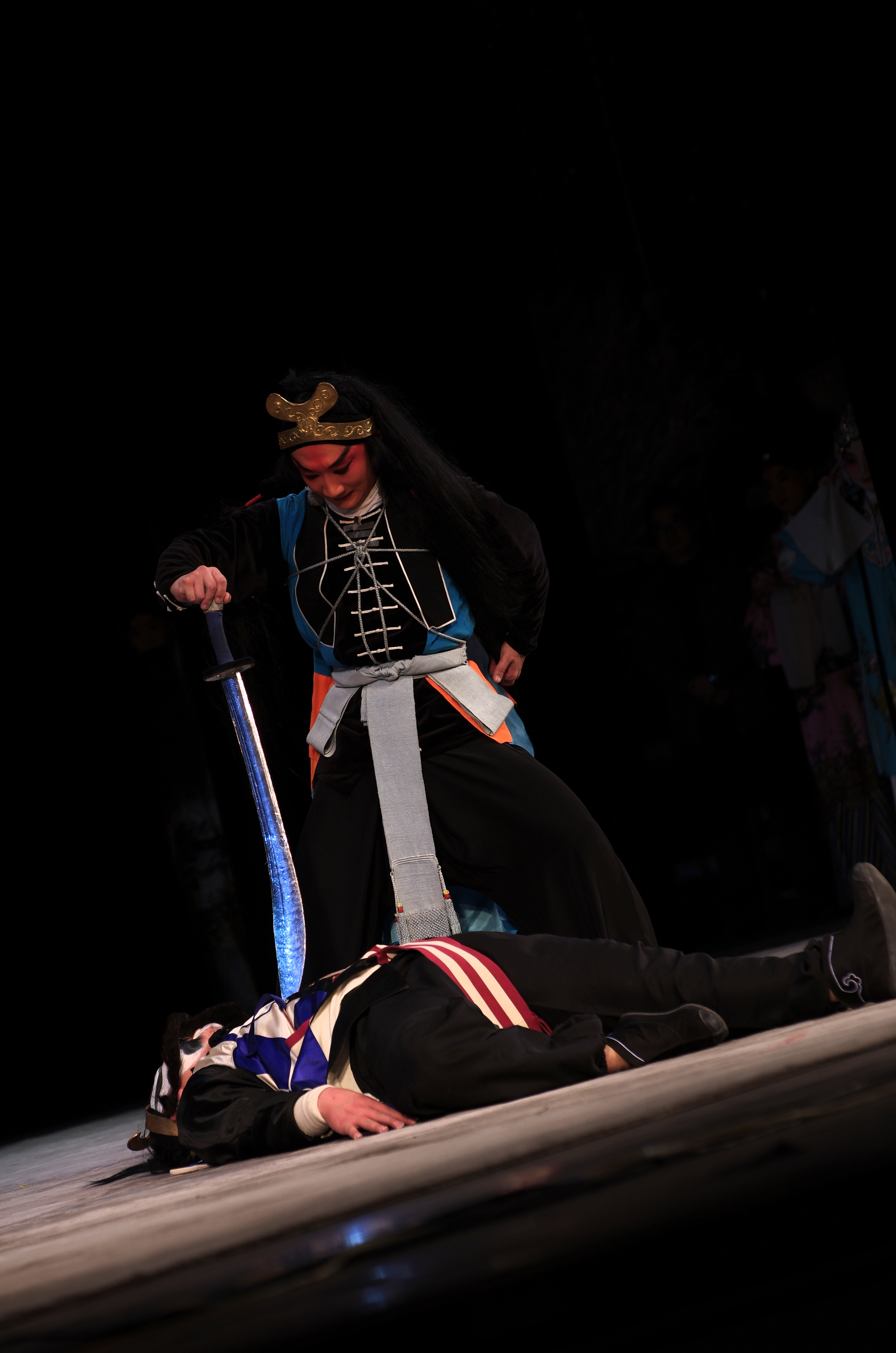
Wu Song slays the "Flying Centipede", from a 2014 Peking opera performance by Shanghai Jingju Theatre Company in Tianchan Theatre, Shanghai.

Other notable actors who have portrayed Wu Song include Zhu Yanping in the 1983 television series Outlaws of the Marsh, and Chen Long in the 2011 television series All Men Are Brothers.

=== Scholarship ===
Wu Song has also been discussed in scholarship on Chinese masculinity and heroism. Kam Louie reads Wu Song as a "working-class" figure whose appeal is tied to martial strength and violent action rather than scholarly refinement, and situates the character within a broader repertoire of heroic masculinity in late imperial Chinese vernacular fiction.

=== Comics ===
In the 20th century, lianhuanhua (連環畫; linked-picture storybooks) became a major format for popularising stories from classical novels, including Water Margin, and such picture-story adaptations circulated widely in mainland China. A library overview of Chinese comics notes that multi-volume lianhuanhua series adapted from Water Margin were, for many readers, an early point of contact with Chinese classical literature. Library catalog records also show that illustrated editions of lianhuanhua adapted from Water Margin tend to focus on Wu Song's story.

The Hong Kong comic Old Master Q also has a special edition animated cartoon featuring Water Margin characters, with the primary focus on Wu Song. However, this version is extensively modified and presents a skewed version of Wu Song's story.

=== Wu Song's story in Chinese education ===
As one of the best known characters in Water Margin, Wu Song's story has served as material for teaching literature and disseminating traditional values in Chinese education. The chapter about Wu Song killing the tiger, in particular, is frequently adapted or excerpted and included in primary and secondary school Chinese textbooks and extracurricular reading materials due to its complete narrative and vivid character portrayal. In textbooks, Wu Song is described as a brave and righteous figure, with his strength and courageous actions considered core characteristics for understanding his personality. Compared to the original work's depiction of revenge, complex ethical choices, and violence, textbook texts often omit or downplay these elements to highlight the legendary nature of the story and the hero's personality. Through this selective presentation, Wu Song has gradually been portrayed in textbooks as a "tiger-slaying hero". His story is primarily used to cultivate students' interest in classical literature and enhance their understanding of traditional Chinese values.

=== Video games ===
Wu Song has been adapted and introduced as a playable character in video games, where he usually appears as a high-attack character skilled in close combat, possessing a skill that increases his attack power after drinking alcohol. Most of his skills emphasize his strength and explosiveness, thus preserving the image of the "tiger-slaying hero" in Water Margin.

In the indie strategy game Drunken Jianghu: Wu Song, Wu Song appears as a playable protagonist, with his storyline and skills revolving around key moments in Water Margin, allowing players to reenact the tiger-slaying story.

In the web-based strategy game Dream Emperor, players can recruit Wu Song as a general. As an S-rank weapon, his skills also reflect his martial arts prowess.

In the card mobile game Little Raccoon Water Margin, Wu Song appears as a card character, possessing skills such as "Jade Ring Drunken Steps," showcasing his combat abilities similar to those in the game.

In the MMORPG Water Margin Online adapted from Water Margin, Wu Song is a playable character.

In the early console game Water Margin, Wu Song appears as a core character in a turn-based strategy adventure game, showcasing early video games' homage to classic characters from Water Margin.

In the 2023 Korean indie gacha strategy game Limbus Company, Wu Song is reflected as a drunken assassin, the Night Drifter of the Drunken Palm (Hangul: 취수야객, chwi-su-ya-gaeg).

== See also ==
- List of Water Margin minor characters § Wu Song's story for a list of supporting minor characters from Wu Song's story
