= Pan Jinlian =

Water Margin character

- Pan Jinlian (right) playing the pipa, attributed to Gu Jianlong of the Qing dynasty, the Met
- Traditional Chinese: 潘金蓮
- Simplified Chinese: 潘金莲
Transcriptions
Standard Mandarin
- Hanyu Pinyin: Pān Jīnlián
- Wade–Giles: P'an^{1} Chin^{1}-lien^{2}
- IPA: [pʰán tɕín.ljɛ̌n]

Pan Jinlian (Chinese: 潘金蓮; Wade–Giles: P'an Chin-lien) is a fictional character in the Chinese novel Jin Ping Mei (The Plum in the Golden Vase), and a minor character in Water Margin, one of the Four Great Classical Novels of Chinese literature. She is an archetypal femme fatale and one of the most notorious villainesses of classical Chinese culture. Her story contributed to the popularization of the “hero kills his sister-in-law” trope in Chinese literature. She has also become the patron goddess of brothels and prostitutes.

== Name ==
Pan Jinlian's name appears to be inspired by Pan Yunu, an imperial consort of the Southern Qi. Her husband, Xiao Baojuan, was obsessed with her small feet and made her dance on golden (金, jin) lotuses (蓮, lian).

Pan Jinlian also appeared to be based on the false rumors a real namesake lady who had a sharply different personality. The reputation of real-life Pan Jinlian was badly affected by the fictional Pan Jinlian and this incident also caused a rift between Pan family and Shi family (the family of Shi Nai'an, author of Water Margin) for a long time until descendants of Shi family made an official apology in 2009.

== As a historical figure ==
Local folklore in Qinghe County, Hebei, claims that Pan Jinlian was a real historical figure rather than a fictional character. According to this narrative, she was born in Huangjinzhuang, Qinghe County, and married a local scholar named Wu Zhi (武植), or Wu Da in Water Margen, who passed the imperial examinations, served as magistrate of Yanggu County, and lived harmoniously with Pan Jinlian into old age. Qinghe County is also said to contain a tomb attributed to Wu Zhi, accompanied by an inscription praising both Wu and his wife, Lady Pan, as virtuous and happily married.

However, Shen Shiyuan, chief editor of the New Qinghe County Gazetteer (《新编清河县志》), notes that none of the historical editions of the Qinghe County Gazetteer, compiled and revised multiple times since the Jiajing reign (1550), contain any record of Wu Zhi or Pan Jinlian as historical figure. Instead, modern gazetteers include their story under the category of “folk literature” in the “Culture” section.

== Origin ==
The Pan Jinlian episode in Water Margin emerged from previous dramas and narrative of the sexually transgressive sister-in-law whose adultery leads to violence and moral retribution. One precursor is the Yuan-dynasty drama Yanqing Boyu (《燕青博鱼》) by Li Wenwei. There are many similar structures and plots shared between the play and later episodes in Water Margin, including sworn brotherhood, the rejection of an adulterous sister-in-law’s advances, sister-in-law’s affair, and the eventual punishment of illicit lovers. Another precursor is believed to be Zhang Qian Killing His Brother’s Wife (《鲠直张千替杀妻》), which has plots similar to that of Pan Jinlian, including sister-in-law attempts to seduce the hero, sabotages the hero for sexually assaulting her after being rejected, eventually planning to kill her husband and receiving punished.

== Story ==
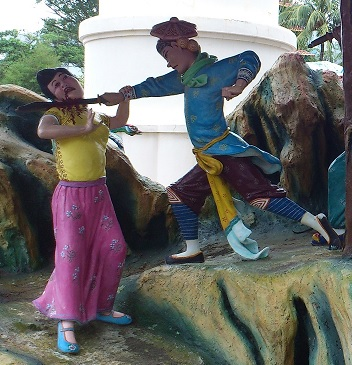
Diorama at Haw Par Villa, Singapore, depicting Wu Song killing Pan Jinlian (left).

Pan Jinlian is married to Wu Dalang, the elder brother of Wu Song. Wu Dalang is short and ugly, while Pan Jinlian is renowned for her beauty; as a result, many people feel that the couple are a mismatch.

Pan Jinlian, dissatisfied with her marriage, has an extramarital affair with Ximen Qing, a handsome womaniser in town. Wu Dalang eventually discovers the affair, but Pan Jinlian and Ximen Qing murder him by adding poison to his food. They bribe the coroner to conceal the true cause of his death.

Wu Song grows suspicious of his brother's death. He carries out his own investigations and discovers the truth. In Water Margin, Wu Song's slaying of the adulterous pair is described in graphic detail and is one of the most memorable scenes in the novel. In Jin Ping Mei, however, Pan Jinlian marries Ximen Qing as a concubine, and Wu Song kills Pan after Ximen dies from excessive sexual activity.

=== Pan Jinlian's story in Water Margin ===
Pan Jinlian was a gorgeous beauty who worked as a maid in a wealthy household in Qinghe. Her master took a liking to her. He wanted to take her as a concubine by force, but Pan Jinlian refused to give in and reported it to the master’s wife. Enraged, the master married her off to Wu Dalang, an ugly man.

Portrayed as a lustful, flirtatious woman, Pan Jinlian felt great dissatisfaction toward Wu Dalang's short stature and unrefined appearance. When Wu Dalang went out to sell flatbread, she would open the door, extend her small, delicate bound feet beneath the bamboo curtain. She would wear heavy makeup and thick osmanthus-scented hair oil. She started having affairs with roguish young men. Thus, the neighbors gossiped that there’s nothing wrong with Pan Jinlian, only that she loves to sneak around with men. The roguish young men often shouted at the Wu household door that a fine piece of mutton had fallen into a dog’s mouth. Being timid and honest, Wu Dalang could no longer bear to remain in the same place; he moved with Pan Jinlian.

Later, Wu Song, Wu Dalang's brother, came to visit. He was a tall, strong hero known for beating a tiger to death. Pan Jinlian immediately entertained illicit thoughts. She would carefully dress herself and constantly tease him. Pan Jinlian invited Wu Song to move in with them, which he did. One day, when it was just the two of them, Pan Jinlian tried to seduce him, but Wu Song stayed unmoved, feeling ashamed and uncomfortable. Wu Song, being a man of honor, sternly rejected her. Humiliated, Pan Jinlian falsely accused Wu Song of attempting to seduce her when Wu Dalang came home. Wu Dalang did not believe her, and Wu Song, unwilling to ruin the harmony of his brother’s household, chose not to confront her and moved out.

One day, after a brief period of peaceful life, while Pan Jinlian was adjusting the bamboo curtain at her door, she accidentally struck Ximen Qing. Ximen Qing was stunned by her beauty. Discovering that Wu Dalang's neighbour was his acquaintance Wang Po, he began visiting Wang Po and asked her to match him with a beautiful woman, and since Pan Jinlian was well-known for her looks, Wang Po immediately understood his intention. Greedy for Ximen Qing's money, she agreed to help.

Wang Po invited Pan Jinlian to help her sew a burial garment. At lunchtime, she kept Pan Jinlian for lunch, while Ximen Qing visited again as planned. Pan Jinlian sat drinking with him, and they soon started flirting with each other. Seeing Pan Jinlian had taken the bait, Wang Po purposely went out to buy wine, creating an opportunity for the two to be alone. Both were overcome with desire, and they consummated their affair. While they were still clinging to each other, Wang Po burst in. She accused Pan Jinlian of cheating on Wu Dalang, threatening to expose the affair to her husband if she didn’t continue meeting Ximen Qing. Then, she demanded payment from Ximen Qing as compensation, fearing he might try to back out. Soon, the entire neighborhood knew of Pan Jinlian and Ximen Qing's affair, but no one told Wu Dalang.

Eventually, a young man named Yunge had a conflict with Wang Po and informed Wu Dalang of the affair. Wu Dalang and Yunge went to catch them and found Ximen Qing and Pan Jinlian together in bed. Wu Dalang was no match for Ximen Qing, who kicked him in the chest, injuring him. Due to his physical weakness, Wu Dalang had a timid personality. He begged Pan Jinlian to at least fulfill the basic duties of a wife, and he would pretend not to know about the affair. He threatened that if Pan Jinlian refused, he would tell his fiery younger brother Wu Song and have him punish the adulterous pair, but Pan Jinlian remained unashamed. The next day, leaving the injured Wu Dalang at home, she again dressed elaborately and went to Wang Po’s house to meet with Ximen Qing. During this time, she ignored Wu Dalang and treated him even more cruelly.

Pan Jinlian conspired with Ximen Qing and Wang Po on how to deal with Wu Dalang. Wang Po proposed poisoning him. Ximen Qing, whose family operated a pharmacy, provided the poison. Pan Jinlian mixed it into a medicinal soup for Wu Dalang, fed it to him, then suffocated him with a pillow. Ximen Qing attempted to bribe He Jiushu, the official responsible for the autopsy. Jiushu remained silent temporarily. Later, Wu Song came to visit the family home and was shocked to find his brother’s sudden death. He immediately suspected that his brother had been murdered. One night, Wu Song received signs from Wu Dalang's restless spirit, which deepened his suspicion. He thus went to question He Jiushu and learned the truth. Furious, Wu Song reported the crime to the authorities, but the county clerks, fearing Ximen Qing’s power, claimed there was insufficient evidence.

Enraged, Wu Song seized Pan Jinlian and Wang Po, brought them for questioning, and gathered neighbors as witnesses. He scraped Pan Jinlian’s face repeatedly with the tip of a knife, who eventually confessed everything. Wu Song then grabbed her hair and threw her to the ground, slit open her chest, and sacrificed her heart and organs to his brother, eventually beheading her. She died at the age of twenty-two.

== Motif-based development ==
Pan Jinlian is considered one of the most iconic and enduring embodiments of the “wanton woman” (淫妇) in the Chinese literary imagination. Wu Song Killing Pan Jinlian, along with other identical stories, fall into a story motif called the “hero-kills-the-sister-in-law” (英雄杀嫂). This general plot type usually involves:

1. The brothers recognize each other;
2. The hero encounters his sister-in-law;
3. The sister-in-law develops desire for the hero;
4. The hero rejects her advances;
5. The sister-in-law commits adultery with another man;
6. The sister-in-law sows discord and falsely accuses the brothers;
7. The hero investigates and uncovers the illicit affair;
8. The hero's interrogation or confrontation;
9. The hero kills his sister-in-law.

== Scholarly Interpretations ==
Pan Jinlian has long been regarded as the archetypal “wanton woman” (淫妇 yínfù) in Chinese literature and culture. Since the late imperial era, and especially by the 20th century, her name became virtually synonymous with a sexually immoral, treacherous woman. In popular discourse, it was not uncommon for people to insult an allegedly promiscuous woman as “a Pan Jinlian.” For example, in the Hong Kong film The Reincarnation of Golden Lotus (1989) a character calls Pan “the number one slut in history” in reference to her notorious reputation.

Some scholars have argued that the enduring fascination with Pan Jinlian’s character stems from the fundamental conflict she embodies between human desires and Confucian moral constraints. Literary critic Yuan Guoxing observes that the “Pan Jinlian motif” symbolically fuses beauty and transgression, dramatizing an eternal tension between natural passion and ethical order in Chinese society. Yuan further suggests that this symbolic tension has contributed to the continued resonance of the Pan Jinlian figure across different historical periods.

Modern critics have frequently re-evaluated Pan Jinlian, with changing social attitudes casting her in a more sympathetic light. In 1928, Chinese playwright Ouyang Yuqian, a pioneer of modern drama, wrote Pan Jinlian, an early attempt to rewrite the character from a new perspective. According to later scholarly analysis, Ouyang's adaptation portrays Pan Jinlian as a free-spirited woman constrained by a rigid, male-dominated social order. Scholars have noted that the play reframes her actions, including adultery and the murder of her husband, as responses shaped by coercive marriage arrangements and the denial of emotional autonomy. In this interpretation, Pan Jinlian is presented less as an inherent moral transgressor than as a victim of oppressive social norms.

== Adaptations ==
In the post-May Fourth era, the influential playwright Ouyang Yuqian wrote the early modern drama Pan Jinlian in 1928, in which Pan is depicted as a free-spirited woman victimized by a male-dominated traditional society. He played the role of Pan Jinlian himself. A pingju version of the story was one of the roles played by Bai Yushuang in Shanghai in the 1930s. The 1985 absurdist chuanju Pan Jinlian by Wei Minglun takes up the gender issue through a reevaluation of Pan Jinlian.

Pan Jinlian is a popular subject of Chinese and Japanese films and television series. Since the 1950s, there have been at least 20 films and television series featuring her as a main character. The Chinese name of the film I Am Not Madame Bovary is literally I Am Not Pan Jinlian.

Title	Release year	Origin of production
The Amorous Lotus Pan	1964	Hong Kong
Outlaws of the Marsh (TV series)	1983	China
The Reincarnation of Golden Lotus	1989	Hong Kong
The Amorous Lotus Pan	1994	Hong Kong
The Water Margin (1998 TV series)	1998	China
All Men Are Brothers (TV series)	2011	China
I Am Not Madame Bovary	2016	China
