= Ximen Qing =

Fictional character in classical Chinese literature

- Traditional Chinese: 西門慶
- Simplified Chinese: 西门庆
Transcriptions
Standard Mandarin
- Hanyu Pinyin: Xīmén Qìng
- IPA: [ɕí.mə̌n tɕʰîŋ]
Yue: Cantonese
- Yale Romanization: Sāi-mùhn Hing
- Jyutping: Sai1-mun4 Hing3
- IPA: [sɐj˥.mun˩ hɪŋ˧]

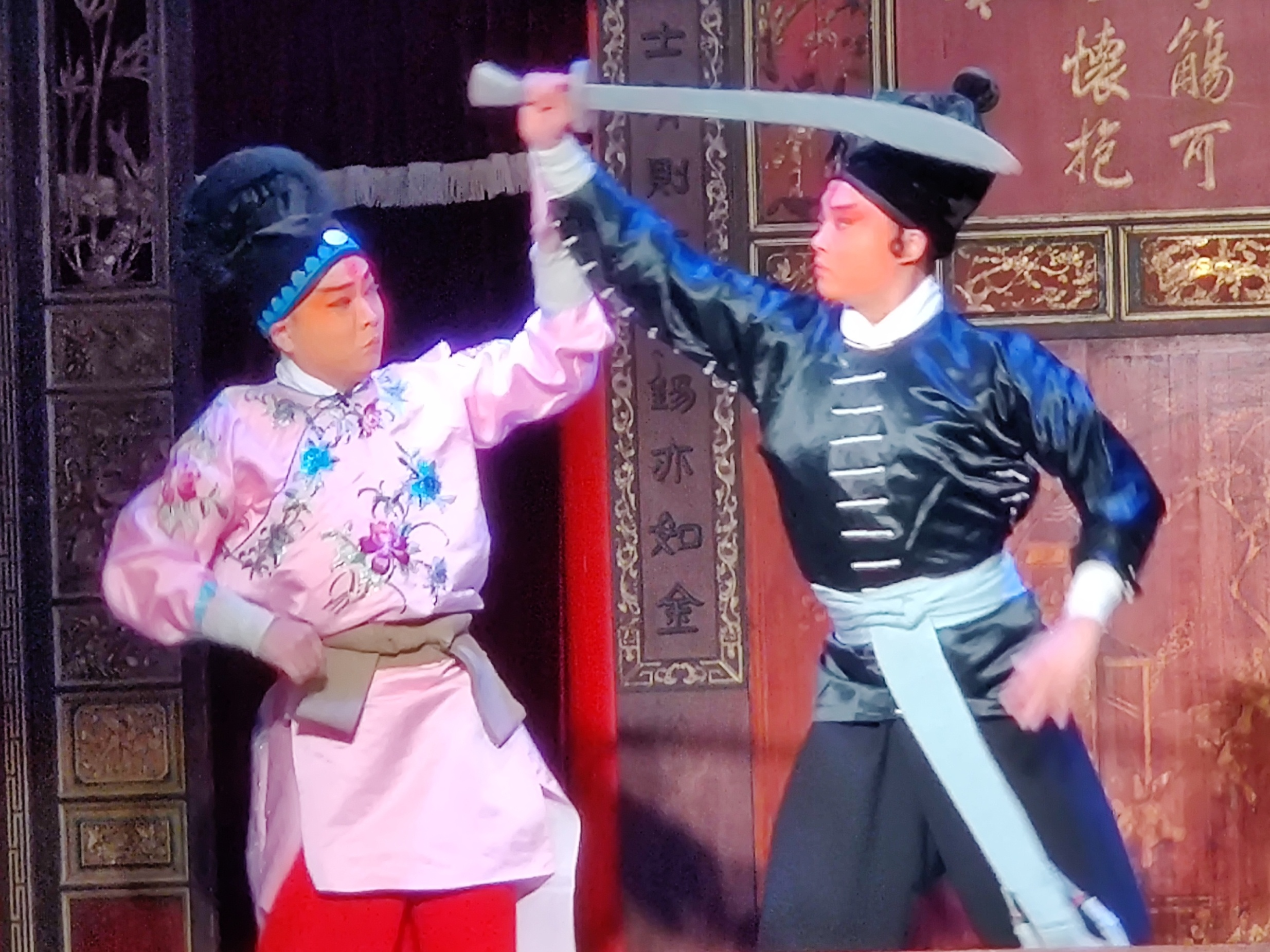
Ximen Qing (left) fights with Wu Song, from the Peking opera Lion Tower.

Ximen Qing (Chinese: 西門慶) is a fictional Chinese Song dynasty merchant, womanizer, and murderer in Yanggu County, Shandong. He is the male protagonist in the classic Chinese novel Jin Ping Mei and a minor character in the classic Chinese novel Water Margin. In both novels, Ximen is portrayed as a lascivious and immoral man who starts a secret affair with Pan Jinlian and helps her murder her husband Wu Dalang by poisoning.

Where the two novels differ is what happens when Wu Dalang's brother Wu Song confronts Ximen Qing at Lion Tower. In Water Margin, the older novel, Wu Song kills Ximen Qing in broad daylight and is exiled. In Jin Ping Mei, however, Ximen Qing escapes and bribes the county magistrate to have Wu Song arrested and exiled. Jin Ping Mei then follows Ximen Qing's degenerate pursuits of women and power until he dies from aphrodisiac overdose.

== Sexual partners ==
- Lady Chen (陳氏), first wife
- Wu Yueniang (吳月娘), second wife
- Li Jiao'er (李娇兒), first concubine, originally a prostitute
- Zhuo Diu'er (卓丟兒), second concubine, originally a prostitute
- Meng Yulou (孟玉樓), third concubine, originally the wife of Yang Zongxi
- Sun Xue'e (孫雪娥), fourth concubine, originally a widower
- Pan Jinlian (潘金蓮), lover, fifth concubine, originally the wife of Wu Dalang
- Li Ping'er (李瓶兒), sixth concubine, originally the wife of Hua Zixu
- Pang Xuemei (龐春梅), originally a maid
- Yingchun (迎春), maid
- Xiuchun (秀春), maid
- Lanchun (蘭香), maid
- Song Huilian (宋惠蓮), wife of Lai Wang
- Wang Liu'er (王六兒), wife of Han Daoguo
- Ruyi'er (如意兒)
- Ben Sisao (賁四嫂)
- Huiyuan (惠元)
- Madam Lin (林太太)
- Li Guijie (李桂姐)
- Wu Yin'er (吳銀兒)
- Zheng Aiyue (鄭愛月)
- Zhang Xichun (張惜春)
- Servant boy, homosexual partner
