= Fireteam =

Small military unit of infantry

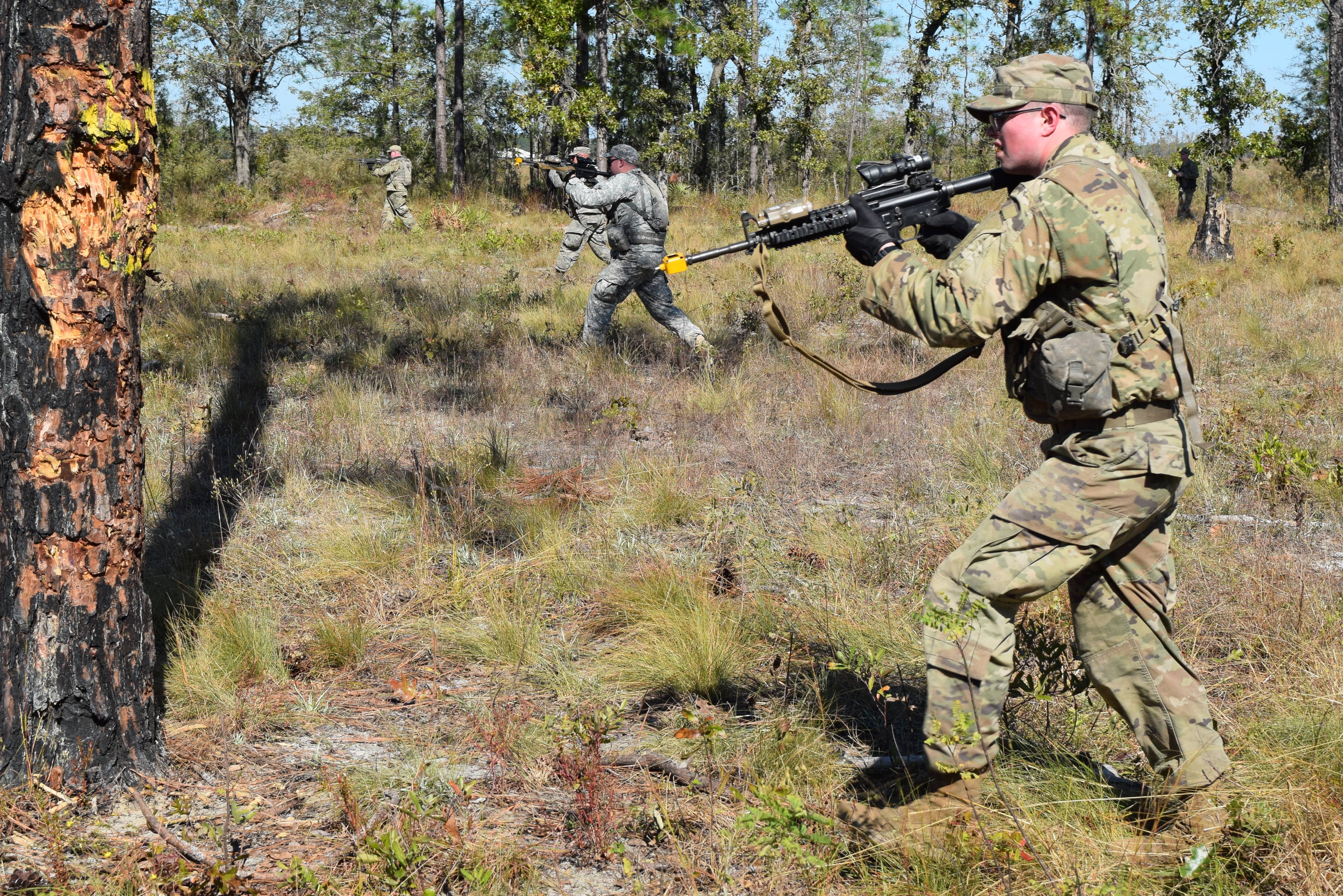
A Georgia National Guard fireteam armed with M4 carbines during a military exercise.

NATO Map Symbols
A fireteam
An infantry fireteam
a military police dog team
an Engineer EOD team

A fireteam or fire team is a small modern military subordinated element of infantry designed to optimize "NCO initiative", "combined arms", "bounding overwatch" and "fire and movement" (Note: Fire and maneuver is a technique of advance in which one element (the maneuver element) moves while being supported by another element (the support by fire element); a separate and distinct mission is assigned to each element. Fire and movement is a technique of advance in which elements and individuals provide their own suppression and move by bounds; elements and individuals alternate the firing and moving so that movement is always covered by fire, and the assault's momentum is retained. A commonly held misconception is that these are separate and distinct concepts. The concepts, much like the Art and Science of Tactics, are most often intertwined.) tactical doctrine in combat. Depending on mission requirements, a typical "standard" fireteam consists of four or fewer members: an automatic rifleman, a grenadier, a rifleman, and a designated fireteam leader. The role of each fireteam leader is to ensure that the fireteam operates as a cohesive unit. Two or three fireteams are organized into a section or squad in co-ordinated operations, which is led by a squad leader.

Historically, militaries with strong reliance and emphasis on decentralized NCO-corp institutions and effective "bottom-up" fireteam organization command structures have had significantly better combat performance from their infantry units in comparison to militaries limited to officer-reliant operations, traditionally larger units lacking NCO-leadership and "top-down" centralized-command structures. Fireteam organization addresses the realities of 21st-century warfare where combat is getting exponentially faster and more lethal as it identifies and removes anything which slows down the reaction time between first detection of an enemy and rounds impacted.

U.S. Army doctrine recognizes the fire team, or crew, as the smallest military organization while NATO doctrine refers to this level of organization simply as team. Fireteams are the most basic organization upon which modern infantry units are built in the British Army, Royal Air Force Regiment, Royal Marines, United States Army, United States Marine Corps, United States Air Force Security Forces, Canadian Forces, and Australian Army.

In the Estonian Land Forces, Finnish Army, Swedish Army and Ukrainian Ground Forces the smallest unit is a fire-and-manoeuvre team.

== NATO military symbol ==
U.S. Army in Chapter 2 of Army Doctrine Publication No. 3-90 provides the following definitions for army echelons:

- a fire team is a small military unit typically containing four or fewer Soldiers; a fire team is usually grouped by two or three teams into a squad or section
- a crew is a small military unit that consists of all personnel operating a particular system
- a squad is a small military unit typically containing two or more fire teams; in some cases, the crew of a system may also be designated as a squad
- a section is a tactical unit of the Army and Marine Corps smaller than a platoon and larger than a squad

U.S. Army Field Manual No. 1-02.2 in Table 2-3 and NATO standard APP-06 in Table 1-8 provide the following symbols for these echelons:

Echelon	Team / Crew	Squad	Section
Symbol	Ø	●	●●

In practice, the meaning of these symbols depends on the NATO member country. For example

- Table 2-3 in U.S. Army Field Manual No. 1-02.2 and U.S. designations in Annex B to APP-06 contain the note that Common English language definition also applies to symbol ●, “a small group engaged in a common effort or occupation”
- The Military English Guide v. 1.4, published by Swedish Defence University, makes no distinction between a section and a squad, designating them with the symbol ●●; a fire team is designated by the symbol ●

Symbols and names of teams (or their analogs) in NATO member armed forces:

United States	Ø	Team	
Italy	Ø	Nucleo	unit, group, squad
Portugal	Ø	Equipa	team
Slovakia	Ø	Tím	team
France	●	Equipe	team
Spain	●	Equipo	team
Spain	●	Escuadra	squad
Estonia	●	Salk	squad
Latvia	●	Grupa	
Germany	●	Trupp	
Canada (Note: not explicitly stated in APP-06)	●	assault group	

== Concept ==
The concept of the fireteam is based on the need for tactical flexibility in infantry operations. A fireteam is capable of autonomous operations as part of a larger unit. Successful fireteam employment relies on quality small unit training for soldiers, experience of fireteam members operating together, sufficient communications infrastructure, and a quality non-commissioned officer corps to provide tactical leadership for the team.

These requirements have led to successful use of the fireteam concept by more professional militaries. It is less useful for armies employing massed infantry formations, or with significant conscription. Conscription makes fireteam development difficult, as team members are more effective as they build experience over time working together and building personal bonds.

In combat, while attacking or maneuvering, a fireteam generally spreads over a distance of 50 metres (160 ft), while in defensive positions the team can cover up to the range of its weapons or the limits of visibility, whichever is less. In open terrain, up to 500 metres (1,600 ft) can be covered by an effective team, although detection range limits effectiveness beyond 100 metres (330 ft) or so without special equipment. A team is effective so long as its primary weapon remains operational.

== National variations ==
=== Canada ===
In the Canadian Army, "fireteam" refers to two soldiers paired for fire and movement. Two fireteams form an "assault group", which is analogous to most other militaries' understanding of a fireteam; two assault groups and a vehicle group of one driver and one gunner form a section of ten soldiers.

- Team leader: An NCO (sergeant if assault group one master corporal if assault group two), carries a C7 rifle.
- Rifleman: One corporal or private, carries a C7 rifle.
- Grenadier: One corporal or private, carries a C7 rifle with an M203 grenade launcher.
- Gunner: One corporal or private, carries a C9 light machine gun.

=== China ===
People's Liberation Army forces traditionally used three-man "cells" (equivalent to fireteams) as the smallest military formation and such organization was widely employed throughout the Second Sino-Japanese War, Chinese Civil War, Korean War, Sino-Indian War, Vietnam War as well as Sino-Vietnamese War. It is unofficially named the "three-three organization". （三三制）

In Chinese sources, this tactic is referred to as "three-three fireteams", after the composition of the attack: three men would form one fireteam, and three fireteams one squad. A Chinese platoon, consisting of 50 men, would form three ranks of such fireteams, which would be employed to attack "one point" from "two sides." Each cell carries at least one automatic weapon (submachine guns or light machine guns in the Korean War, assault rifles or squad automatic weapons in the early to mid-cold war), while the rest carried a bolt-action rifle or a semiautomatic rifle so that each "cell" could independently fire and maneuver.

An example of a People's Volunteer Army fireteam in the late Korean War,

- Squad leader/second in command/party member: Carried a Type 50 SMG, acted as the team leader
- Rifleman/machine gunner: Carried a Mosin–Nagant rifle or a DP-27 machinegun
- Rifleman/assistant machine gunner: Carried a Mosin–Nagant rifle

=== Finland ===
In the military publication Soldier's Guide 2017 (Sotilaan käsikirja 2017), prepared by Defence Command Finland, a 2-soldier formation (taistelupari, literally battle pair), and a 3-soldier formation (partio, literally patrol) were referred to by the same name: fire team. In publications Soldier's Guide 2020 and Soldier's Guide 2024, the 2-soldier formation was called a fire-and-manoeuvre team.

=== French ===
The French section (groupe de combat – "combat group") is divided into two teams. The "fire team" (équipe de feu) is based around the section-level automatic rifle or light machine gun. The "shock team" (équipe de choc), made up of riflemen armed with rifle grenades or disposable rocket launchers, is the reconnaissance and maneuver unit. The teams employ bounding overwatch, with one element covering as the other moves. The team leaders have handheld radios so the elements can stay in contact with each other, as well as with the section leader's backpack radio set. The most common symbol of the modern French junior NCO (chef d'équipe) has been a radio hanging around their neck.

=== Russian Armed Forces ===
According to the Combat Regulations for the Preparation and Conduct of Combined Arms Combat, approved by Order No. 19 of the Commander-in-Chief of the Ground Forces of the Russian Armed Forces dated February 24, 2005:

- the order of battle of a motorized rifle squad may be based on maneuver and fire combat groups, the composition of which is determined by the squad commander
- the maneuver group (usually a senior rifleman and one or two riflemen) is designed to perform missions to destroy the enemy, firmly hold positions and objectives, and capture their facilities, weapons, and equipment
- the fire group (usually a squad leader, a grenade launcher, an assistant rifleman, and a machine gunner) is designed to provide fire support to the maneuver group and jointly perform missions to destroy the enemy, firmly hold positions and occupants, and capture their facilities, weapons, and equipment
- the composition of combat groups depends on the assigned mission and the prevailing conditions and may therefore vary
- the combat formation of a motorized rifle squad advancing on foot typically includes a maneuver group, a fire group, and a combat vehicle.

=== Spanish Army ===
Sub-subunits of the Spanish Army:

- Rifle squad (Spanish: escuadra de fusileros): made up of a corporal and 3–4 soldiers, so in this context it can be considered analogous to a fireteam
- Machine gun squad (Spanish: escuadra de ametralladora), mortar squad (Spanish: escuadra de mortero), grenade launcher squad (Spanish: escuadra de lanzagranada): made up of a corporal and 2–3 soldiers
- Rifle section (Spanish: pelotón fusilero) consisting two rifle squads or one rifle squad and one machine gun squad
- Mixed section (Spanish: pelotón mixto) consisting of one rifle squad and one mortar or grenade launcher squad

=== Ukraine ===
According to the Combat Regulations SBP 3-(01,02,04).58(59), the squad leader determines the composition of the fireteams (Ukrainian: бойова група, literally combat group) in the context of the situation: usually a squad consists of three 3-infantrymen groups or one 3-infantrymen group and three 2-infantrymen groups (Ukrainian: бойова пара/двійка/трійка, literally combat pair/deuce/triple (Note: Ukrainian Combat Regulations SBP 3-(01,02,04).58(59) use the terms "deuce" ("двійка") and "triple" ("трійка"))), one of which includes the squad leader, but it is also possible to create a one 4-infantrymen group instead of 2 pairs.

In offensive combat, combat groups (“twos”, “threes”) are created to increase the effectiveness of task performance during operations in trenches, communication moves, as well as in special combat conditions. The groups conduct an offensive with an interval of 20–25 m between themselves, and between soldiers in them - 3–5 m. Combat groups can operate in a line, a ledge or in two lines (one after the other). By their purpose, combat groups can be maneuverable and fire:

- a maneuver group (Ukrainian: маневрена група) is intended to seize the object of attack, destroy the enemy in the trench (clear the trench), perform a maneuver to reach the enemy's flank and rear, consolidate the achieved line, and perform other tasks; in some cases, it can make passes in mine-explosive and non-explosive obstacles, performing the functions of a clearing group; usually includes a senior rifleman (group leader), a rifleman and a machine gunner
- a fire group (Ukrainian: вогнева група) is intended to cover the actions of the maneuver group, prevent the enemy from approaching (maneuvering) those defending, complete the destruction of enemy manpower and firepower in the object of attack, and capture it together with the maneuver group; usually includes a squad commander (who leads the fire team), a machine gunner, a grenade launcher, and a rifleman.

An example of the composition of combat groups in offensive combat and in defense:

- 1st group: senior rifleman (OR-3), (Note: in the Ukrainian Armed Forces, senior soldiers (OR-3): may hold the positions of senior gunner, senior machine gunner, senior grenade launcher, etc.; according to Article 128 of the Internal Service Regulations of the Armed Forces of Ukraine, they are assistants to the squad commander and are required to assist the squad commander in training soldiers and replace him in his absence) machine gunner (OR-2), rifleman (OR-2)
- 2nd group: squad leader (OR-4), grenade launcher (OR-2), grenade launcher assistant (OR-2)
- 3rd group: combat vehicle commander (OR-5), driver mechanic (OR-2), gunner-operator (OR-3) / gunner (OR-2)

Tasks for the above groups in defense:

- 1st group: conducting reconnaissance at a range of 500–700 m; destruction of enemy manpower and unarmored vehicles at ranges of 500–300 m; use of the most trained and courageous soldier in reserve to reinforce dangerous places (acts according to the situation)
- 2nd group: conducting reconnaissance at a range of 500–700 m; destruction of enemy manpower and armored vehicles at ranges of 500–300 m; protection of the detachment commander
- 3rd group (CV/APC crew): conducting reconnaissance using optical reconnaissance equipment at a range of up to 2000 m; destruction of enemy manpower at ranges of 1200–1100 m; destruction of enemy armored targets at ranges: CV – 1500 m, APC – 1000 m.

Below are possible examples of dividing a squad into combat groups, in which the squad leader and combat vehicle commander are the same person:

No	1st group	2nd group	3rd group	4th group
1	SL, CV crew + [CV]	GL, AGrL, MGun	Gun, AGun, Med	
2	SL, Med	GL, AGL, MGun	Gun, AG	CV crew + [CV]
3	SL, Gun, AG	GL, AGL	MGun, Med	CV crew + [CV]
4	SL, Med, MGun	GL, AGL	Gun, AG	CV crew + [CV]
5	SL, Gun, AG, Med	GL, AGL, MGun	CV crew + [CV]	

where: SL – combat vehicle commander – squad leader (OR-5); CV crew – deputy combat vehicle commander – gunner-operator (OR-4) and driver-mechanic (OR-2); [CV] – combat vehicle; GL – grenade launcher (OR-2); AGL– rifleman-assistant grenade launcher (OR-2); MGun – machine gunner (OR-2); Gun – gunner (OR-2); AG – assistant gunner (OR-2); Med – rifleman-medic(OR-2)

By order No. 659 of the Minister of Defense of Ukraine, dated January 3, 2023 (came into effect on January 6, 2024), two new positions were introduced for infantry, airborne assault, marines, and similar squads:

- infantry (mechanized infantry, motorized infantry, airmobile, airborne, airborne assault, assault, mountain-assault, marine) squad commander — sergeant (OR-5)
- group commander of infantry (mechanized infantry, motorized infantry, airmobile, airborne, airborne assault, assault, mountain-assault, marine) squad — junior sergeant (OR-4)

At the same time, the previous positions were retained:

- squad commander — junior sergeant (OR-4)
- deputy commander of marine squad — senior seaman (OR-3)

Thus, the Ukrainian armed forces began a transition to a structure similar to the American one, where the table of organization includes a sergeant position of fireteam leader.

=== United Kingdom ===
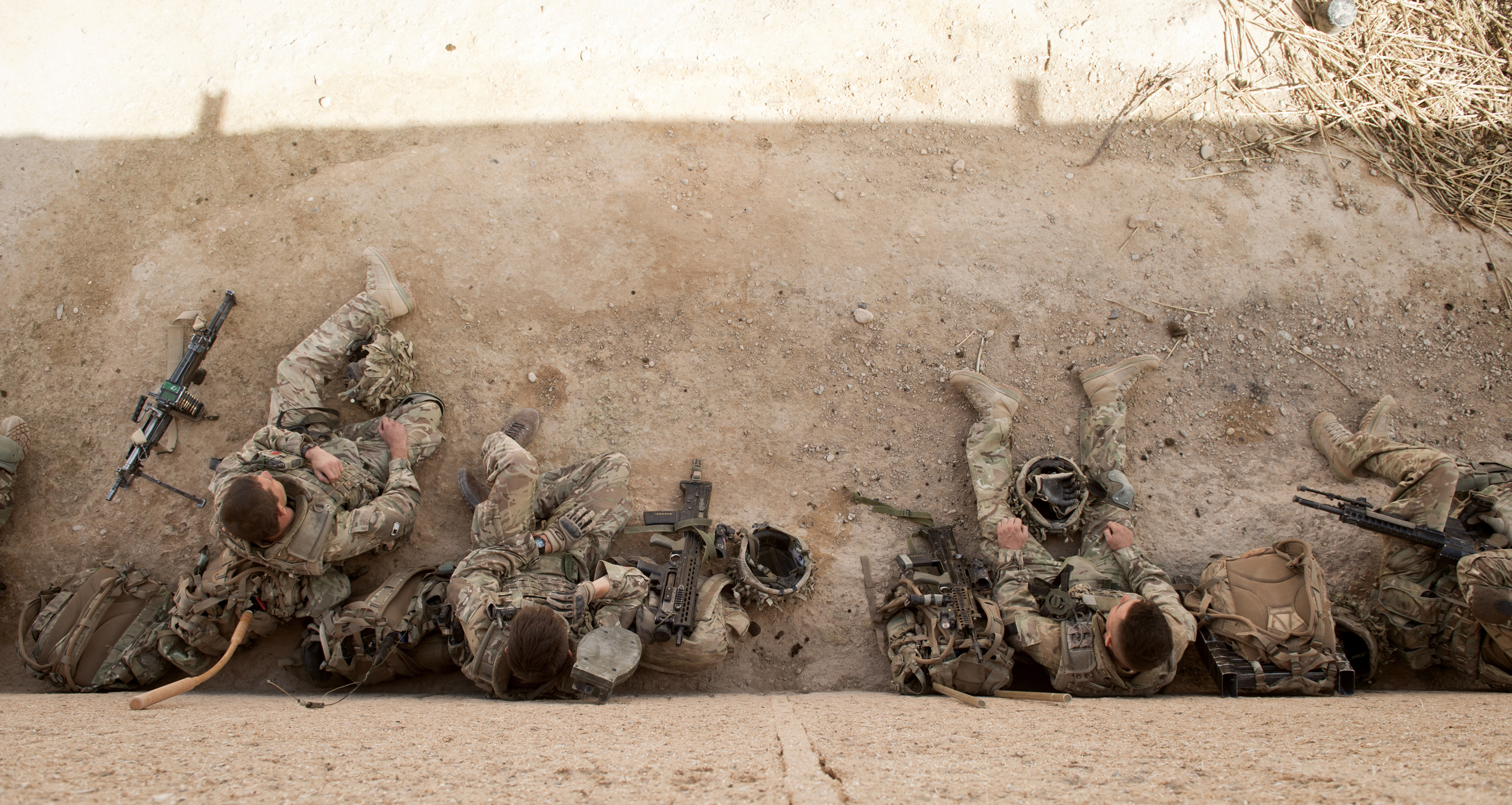
Royal Anglian Regiment soldiers during a lull in operations in Afghanistan in 2014; their numbers and equipment correspond to a British fireteam of the period (Left to right: L110A2 LMG, L85A2 with L123A2 UGL, L85A2, L129A1).

Infantry units of the British Army, Royal Marines and RAF Regiment introduced the fireteam concept following the adoption of the SA80 rifle and light support weapon. An infantry section of eight men contains two fireteams, Charlie and Delta, each comprising an NCO (corporal or lance corporal) and three privates.

- Team leader: This NCO carries an L85 rifle with an L123 underslung grenade launcher. Some units vary with one of the privates carrying the grenade launcher rather than the NCO.
- Rifleman: Two privates carry L85 rifles. Under earlier fireteam organization there also were two riflemen, but the second of these was later substituted with a designated marksman, leaving the section with one rifleman per fireteam. From 2019, the earlier organization was restored and the section commander was given discretion to re-role the section gunner as a third rifleman if needed.
- Gunner: One private per section carries an L7A2 GPMG. Earlier section organizations had one private per fireteam carrying an L86 light support weapon (intended to replace the L7A2) and then an L110 light machine gun; the L110A3 was removed from service in 2019, with the earlier L7A2 being reinstated as the section machine gun.
- Designated marksman: One private per section carries an L129A1 sharpshooter rifle. Earlier fireteam organizations had one private per fireteam carrying either an L86A2 light support weapon or an L129A1 depending on availability; the L86A2 was removed from service in 2019, with the L129A1 officially becoming the standard section DMR.

The fireteam is generally used as a subdivision of the section for fire and maneuver rather than as a separate unit in its own right, although fireteams or fireteam-sized units are often used for reconnaissance tasks, special operations, and urban patrols (usually being to referred to as a "brick" in the latter scenario).

=== United States ===
In U.S. armed forces, the smallest military unit is a fire team, which typically contains four or fewer soldiers/marines and is usually grouped into two or three teams into a squad or section. Fire teams are organized as a fire-and-maneuver team -- one fire team is fighting, while the other is moving.

A rifle fire team consists of four soldiers/marines, a scout team consists of three scouts, but there are also two-man teams armed with antiarmor weapons or medium machine gun:

- Infantry weapons squad (Infantry rifle platoon) consists of a squad leader (staff sergeant) and 4 two-Soldier teams (specialist and private first class):
  - 2 two-Soldier medium machine gun team consists of gunner and an assistant gunner (these teams provide the platoon with medium-range area suppression at ranges up to 1,100 meters during day, night, and adverse weather conditions)
  - 2 two-Soldier close combat missile system Javelin team consists of gunner and an ammunition handler (this system provides the platoon with an extremely lethal fire-and-forget, man-portable, direct- and top-attack capability to defeat enemy armored vehicles and destroy fortified positions at ranges up to 2,000 meters)
- assault section (weapons platoon, Marine rifle company) consists of a section leader (sergeant) and 3 four-Marine assault squad (corporal, lance corporal and two privates); each squad consists of 2 two-Marine assault teams (team leader/gunner and assistent gunner) armed with antiarmor personnel weapons

==== Army ====
The U.S. Army particularly emphasizes the fireteam concept. Per U.S. Army doctrine a typical fire team consists of four soldiers.

- Team Leader (TL): Usually either a sergeant or corporal (although occasionally a team is led by a specialist or private first class when the platoon has a shortage of junior NCOs). Provides tactical leadership for the team at all times; standard equipped with backpack GPS/radio set, and either an M16 rifle, M4 carbine, or M7 rifle.
- Rifleman (R): Is 'the baseline standard for all infantrymen'. They are equipped with the M16 rifle, M4 carbine, or M7 rifle. The rifleman is usually assigned with the grenadier to help balance the firepower capabilities of the automatic rifleman.
- Grenadier rifleman (GR): Provides limited high-angle fire over "dead zones". A grenadier is armed with a rifle or carbine which is equipped with an M203 grenade launcher (or the newer M320 grenade launcher) mounted to the weapon.
- Automatic rifleman (AR): Provides overwatch and suppressive fire through force multiplication. The most casualty-producing person in a fireteam, in terms of firepower and maneuverability when compared to the standard nine-man rifle squad. An automatic rifleman is equipped with an M249 light machine gun or M250 light machine gun. The automatic rifleman is usually assigned with the team leader to maximize directed fields of fire and to help balance the firepower capabilities of the grenadier.

In a Stryker brigade combat team's (SBCT) infantry rifle companies, one man in each rifle squad fireteam is either the squad anti-armor specialist (RMAT) armed with an FGM-148 Javelin, or the squad designated marksman (DM) who carries a designated marksman rifle like the M110 SASS or Mk 14 Enhanced Battle Rifle. In both cases, these two positions replace the basic rifleman of the standard rifle squad.

==== Marine Corps ====
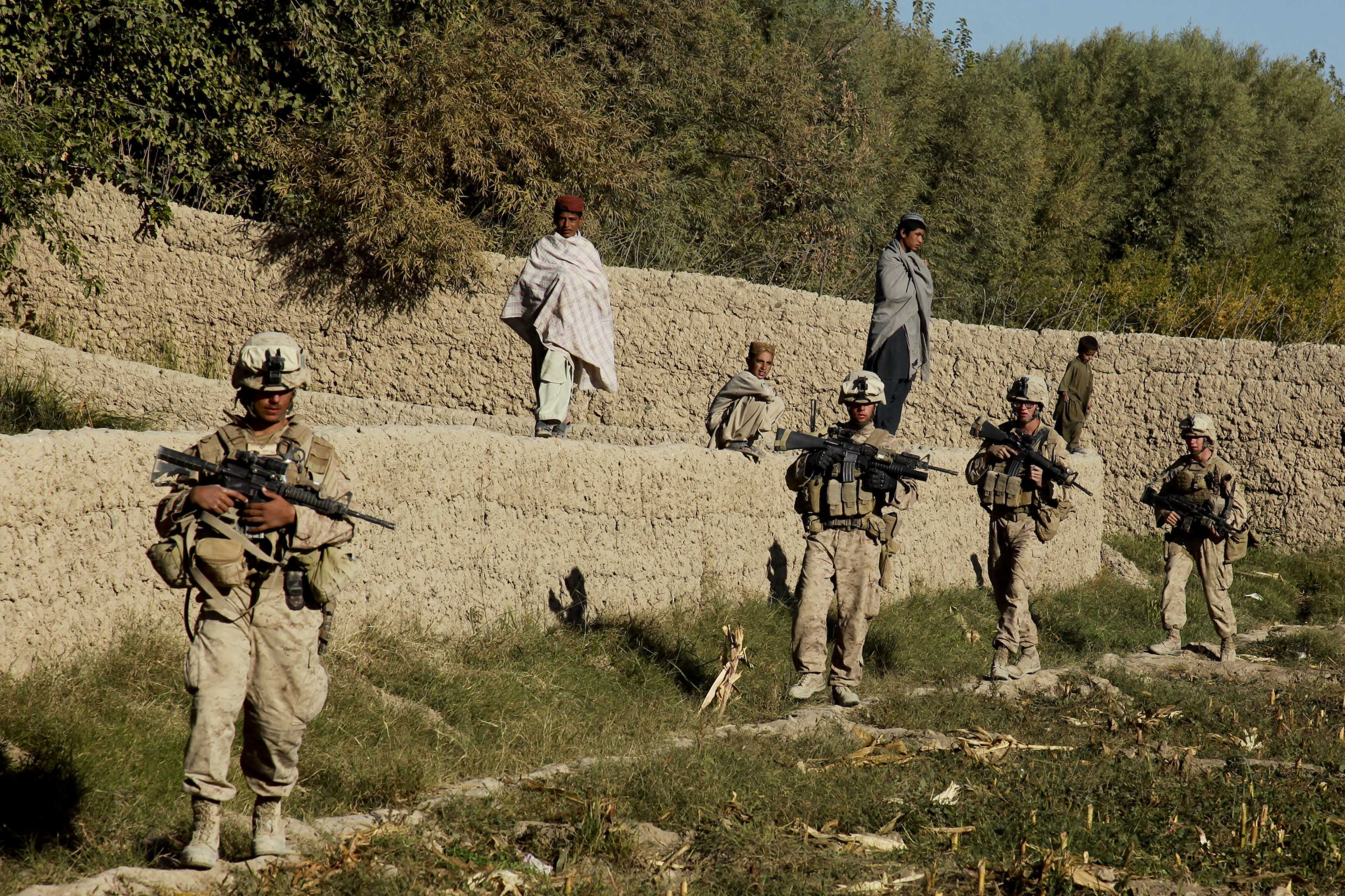
US marines on patrol in Afghanistan, 2009; their numbers and equipment correspond to a United States Marine Corps fireteam (left to right: M4 carbine, M16A4 rifle with M203, M16A4 rifle, M249).

The United States Marine Corps doctrine dictates that any active fireteam will include at least one 2-man gunnery-team and summarizes its fireteam organization with the mnemonic "ready-team-fire-assist", the following being the arrangement of the fireteam when in a column:

- Rifleman: acts as a scout for the fireteam; "ready".
- Team leader: uses an M203 and works as the designated grenadier; "team".
- Designated automatic rifleman: uses an M249 light machine gun or M27 IAR and serves as second in command for the fireteam; "fire".
- Assistant automatic rifleman: standard rifleman tasked with providing spotting support, range-finding, carries extra LMG ammunition, and offers close-protection should the fireteam fall under attack; "assist".

==== Navy ====
Navy construction force, "Seabee" construction battalions, utilize fireteams (as well as companies, platoons, and squads), similar in size to those employed by the USMC, in their organizational structure. Seabee units may be attached to Marine Corps units.

=== Other ===
Many other armed forces see the squad as the smallest military unit; some countries' armies have a pair consisting of two soldiers as the smallest military unit. In others a fireteam is composed of two pairs of soldiers (fire and maneuver team) forming a fireteam. Vietnamese communist forces, who received extensive advisory support from Chinese communists, also adopted a fireteam concept similar to that of Chinese, known as "tam tam chế", and such organization is still in use.

== History ==
Fireteams have their origins in the early 20th century. From the Napoleonic Wars until World War I, military tactics involved central control of large numbers of soldiers in mass formation where small units were given little initiative.

Groups of four soldiers were mainly employed for guard duty, or as bodyguards for VIPs. In the Roman Army they were referred to as quaternio (Greek τετράδιον).

Skirmishers in the Napoleonic War would often work in teams of two, ranging ahead of the main group and providing covering fire for each other.

=== World War I ===
During World War I, trench warfare resulted in a stalemate on the Western Front. In order to combat this stalemate, the Germans developed a doctrinal innovation known as infiltration tactics (based on the Russian tactics used in the Brusilov Offensive), in which a brief intensive artillery preparation would be followed by small, autonomous teams of stormtroopers, who would covertly penetrate defensive lines. The Germans used their stormtroopers organized into squads at the lowest levels to provide a cohesive strike force in breaking through Allied lines. The British and Canadian troops on the Western Front started dividing platoons into sections after the Battle of the Somme in 1916. (This idea was later further developed in World War II). French Chasseur units in WWI were organized into fireteams, equipped with a light machine gun (Chauchat) team and grenades, to destroy German fire positions by fire (not assault) at up to 200 meters using rifle grenades. The light machine gun team would put suppressive fire on the enemy position, while the grenadier team moved to a position where the enemy embrasure could be attacked with grenades. The Chasseur tactics were proven during the Petain Offensive of 1917. Survivors of these French Chasseur units taught these tactics to American infantry, who used them with effectiveness at St. Mihiel and the Argonne. It was typical of a fireteam in this era to consist of four infantrymen: two assaulters with carbines, one grenadier, and one sapper.

=== Interwar period ===
In the inter-war years, United States Marine Corps Captain Evans F. Carlson and Merritt A. Edson are believed to have developed the fireteam concept during the United States occupation of Nicaragua (1912–1933). At that time the US Marine squad consisted of a Corporal and seven Marines all armed with a bolt-action M1903 Springfield rifle and an automatic rifleman armed with a Browning Automatic Rifle. The introduction of the Thompson submachine gun and Winchester Model 1912 shotgun was popular with the Marines as a point-defense weapon for countering ambush by Nicaraguan guerrillas within the thick vegetation that could provide cover for a quick overrun of a patrol. A team of four men armed with these weapons had proven more effective in terms of firepower and maneuverability than the standard nine-man rifle squad.

Carlson, who later went to China in 1937 and observed Communist 8th Route Army units of the National Revolutionary Army in action against the Imperial Japanese Army, brought these ideas back to the US when the country entered World War II. Under his command, the 2nd Marine Raider battalion were issued with the semi-automatic M1 Garand rifle and were organized in the standard 4-man fireteam (although it was called firegroup) concept, 3 firegroups to a squad with a squad leader. A firegroup was composed of an M1 Garand rifleman, a BAR gunner and a submachine gunner. After sustaining severe wounds, Carlson was replaced and his battalion later disbanded and reorganized under conventional Marine doctrine of ten-man squads. Later, Carlson's fireteam concept was re-adopted.

=== World War II ===
WWII US Army rifle squads consisted of twelve soldiers divided into three teams: The A "Able" (contemporary spelling alphabet) team consisted of the squad leader and two scouts, the support B "Baker" team of the BAR gunner, assistant gunner, and ammunition bearer, and C "Charlie" team of the assistant squad leader, also serving as the anti-tank grenadier, and five riflemen, one of whom served as the alternate anti-tank grenadier). In an assault the A team would provide overwatch and security or assist the C team in the assault, as the squad leader directed, while the B team provided suppressive fire. Suppressive fire from the BAR would be supplemented by fire from the rifles of his team as he reloaded, and could be further supplemented by platoon medium machine guns.

The US Army Rangers and Special Service Force adopted an early fireteam concept when on campaign in Italy and France. Each squad sub-unit of four or five men was heavily armed, composed of a two-man BAR automatic rifleman and assistant, a scout (marksman/grenadier) armed with an M1903 Springfield with a rifle grenade discharger, and a team leader armed with an M1 carbine or M1 Thompson submachine gun. Their later misuse as conventional infantry negated their special training and fighting skill and their use as "fire brigades" against larger enemy forces negated their advantages in aggressiveness and firepower.

Meanwhile, the communist Chinese established the three-man fireteam concept as the three-man cell when they organized a regular army, and its organization seemed to have been disseminated throughout all of Asia's communist forces, perhaps the most famous of which are the PAVN/NVA (People's Army of Vietnam/North Vietnamese Army) and the Viet Cong.

== See also ==
- Base of fire
- Battle buddy
- Infantry
- Military science
- Sniper team
