= Fire-and-manoeuvre team =

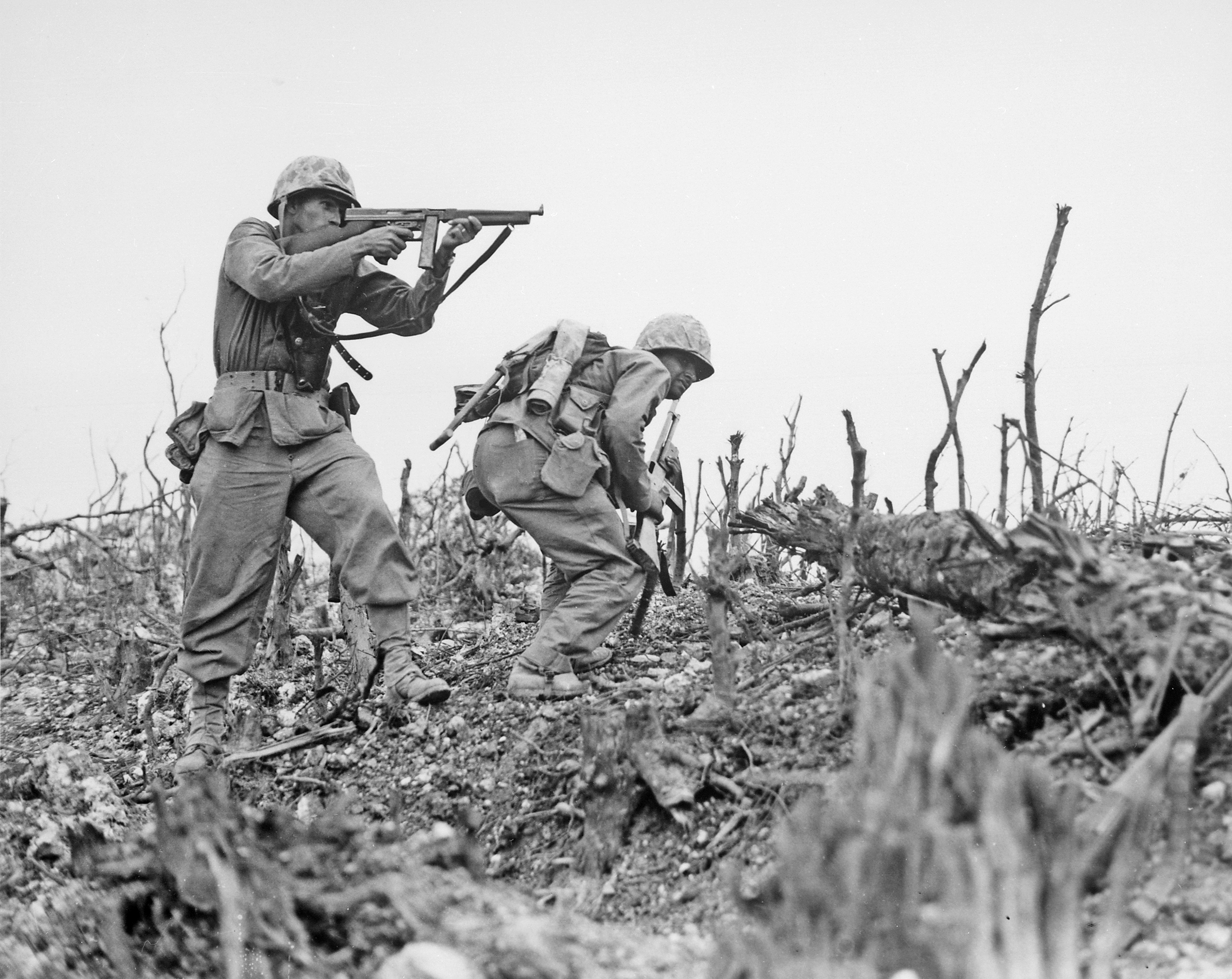
An example of fire and maneuver in actual combat. Here, during the Battle of Okinawa, a US marine on the left provides covering fire for the marine on the right to break cover and move to a different position.

A fire-and-manoeuvre team or fire and maneuver team (Finnish: taistelupari, literally battle pair; Swedish: stridspar, literally combat pair; Ukrainian: бойова пара/двійка/трійка, literally combat pair/deuce/triple (Note: Ukrainian Combat Regulations SBP 3-(01,02,04).58(59) use the terms "deuce" ("двійка") and "triple" ("трійка"))) is the smallest unit above the individual soldier, in the modern era chiefly employed by Baltic militaries and special forces like the Special Air Service. It consists of two soldiers with one soldier acting as senior of the two fighters (decided amongst the two or by their superior).

It is allowed that if a soldier does not have a partner, he becomes the third member of the team. In practice, this means that two of the three soldiers act in sync: they maneuver together while the third one covers them with fire, and together they cover the maneuver of the third one with fire.

== National variations ==
=== Canada ===
The rifle section is normally organized as two assault groups of four soldiers each, and a vehicle group of two (gunner and driver). Each assault group is further divided into two fire teams of two soldiers each.

=== Estonia ===
A fire and maneuver team (Estonian: lahingpaar) is the smallest military formation among the Estonian Ground Force infantry units. The fire and maneuver team is bigger than an individual soldier but smaller than a fireteam (Estonian: Salk).

The fire and maneuver team usually consists of two soldiers. The more experienced soldier leads a fire and maneuver team in the pair.

One fire and maneuver team is meant to operate on a battlefield along with other fire and maneuver teams on a landscape no greater than 20 x 50 metres. There are no logistical support elements in the structure of a fire and maneuver team.

=== Finland ===
In the military publication Soldier's Guide 2017 (Sotilaan käsikirja 2017), prepared by Defence Command Finland, a 2-soldier formation (taistelupari, literally battle pair), and a 3-soldier formation (partio, literally patrol) were referred to by the same name: fire team. In publications Soldier's Guide 2020 and Soldier's Guide 2024, the 2-soldier formation was called a fire-and-manoeuvre team.

Despite its name, Taistelupari does not always consist of exactly two soldiers, since the above publications provide the following example of section organisation:

- First half-section
  - Section Commander armed with a 7.62 RK 62 series rifle
  - First fire-and-manoeuvre team
    - Machine gunner armed with a 7.62 KK PKM general purpose machine gun
    - Rifleman armed with a 7.62 RK 62 series rifle
- Second half-section
  - Second fire-and-manoeuvre team
    - Two riflemen armed with 7.62 RK 62 series rifles and 66 KES anti-tank weapons
  - Third fire-and-manoeuvre team
    - Rifleman armed with a 7.62 RK 62 series rifle
    - Section 2IC armed with a 7.62 RK 62 series rifle
    - Driver armed with a 7.62 RK 62 series rifle

Thus, thanks to the driver, the third fire-and-manoeuvre team consists of three soldiers, while the section leader is unpaired. The publication Taistelijan opas 2013 suggests an example in which the section leader and driver are in the same fire-and-manoeuvre team.

=== Sweden ===
According to the Swedish Armed Forces Soldier Regulations M7742-100002 "SoldF 2001. Soldaten i fält", a Stridspar is the smallest unit where fire and movement can be coordinated. Two soldiers in a Stridspar protect and support each other, both individually and as a group, primarily during combat. If one of them is wounded, the other must be able to drag the wounded to safety, provide first aid and call for medical personnel. A leader must always be appointed in the combat pair. Weapons, ammunition and other equipment are distributed within the combat pair depending on assignment and task. (Note: since 2024, the websites of Astrolabe Publishing Ltd and the Territorial Forces of the Armed Forces of Ukraine have been freely distributing an electronic version of this manual, translated into Ukrainian by a group of volunteers on the initiative and under the guidance of the captain of the Sweden Armed Forces, Daniel Smith)

=== Ukraine ===
According to Combat regulations SBP 3-(01,02,04).58(59), the squad leader determines the composition of the fireteams (Ukrainian: бойова група, literally combat group). Typically, these are teams of 2 or 3 people, one of which includes the squad leader, but it is also possible to create a 4-person team instead of 2 pairs.

The Combat regulations also stipulates that during an attack, one of the teams (fire team), which is called the one performing the fire function, provides with its fire the actions of the other team (maneuver team), destroying the enemy's manpower and firepower at the object of attack, on the flanks and in the nearest depth; the maneuver team attacks the enemy under cover of fire, seizes the specified line, establishes itself on it and ensures the advancement of the fire team.

At the same time, the Methodological materials VP 7-(01,03-05)215.58(59) contain illustrated algorithms for alternating maneuvers and fire within pairs and trios.

=== USA ===
In U.S. armed forces, the smallest military unit is a fire team, which typically contains four or fewer soldiers/marines and is usually grouped into two or three teams into a squad or section. Fire teams are organized as a fire-and-maneuver team -- one fire team is fighting, while the other is moving.

A rifle fire team consists of four soldiers/marines, a scout team consists of three scouts, but there are also two-man teams armed with antiarmor weapons or medium machine gun.

== See also ==
- Battle buddy
- Fireteam
- Infantry
- Military science
- Sniper team
