= Patrol vehicle =

Patrol vehicle may mean:

- A vehicle used for patrolling: see the organization that is using the vehicle
- Among police, a police car

== See also ==
- Nissan Patrol, also called Nissan Safari, a make of four-wheel drive vehicle
