= Squad leader =

Military role

Standard NATO military map symbol for a friendly infantry Squad.

A squad leader or squad commander is a non-commissioned officer (NCO) who leads a military sub-subunit known as a squad.

In the United States military, a squad leader or squad commander is a non-commissioned officer (NCO) who leads a squad of typically nine Soldiers (U.S. Army: squad leader and two fireteams of 4 men each) or 13 Marines (U.S. Marine Corps: squad leader and three fireteams of 4 men each) in a rifle squad, or three to eight men in a crew-served weapons squad. In the U.S. Army Table of Organization and Equipment (TO&E), the rank of a rifle squad leader is staff sergeant and in the Marine Corps the rank is sergeant, though a corporal may also act as a squad leader in the absence of sufficient numbers of sergeants. Squad leaders of crew-served weapons squads range from corporal through staff sergeant, depending upon the branch of service and type of squad.

In some armies, notably those of the British Commonwealth, in which the term section is used for units of this size, the NCO in charge, which in the British Army and Royal Marines is normally a corporal, is termed a section commander. A section is referred to as a squad, in the British Army, only on the parade ground.

== Equivalent selection ==
Equivalent appointments or assignments to squad leader in other armed forces are as follows:

- German Bundeswehr = Gruppenführer (en: group leader)
- Austrian Bundesheer = Gruppenkommandant (en: group commander)

== See also ==
- Team leader
- Platoon leader
