= Team leader =

Role in a group

A team leader is a person who provides guidance, instruction, direction and leadership to a group of individuals (the team) for the purpose of achieving a key result or group of aligned results. Team leaders serve as the steering wheel for a group of individuals who are working towards the same goal. For example, in a military context, a team leader is the non-commissioned officer in charge of a fireteam.

The team leader monitors the quantitative and qualitative achievements of the team and reports results to a manager. The leader often works within the team, as a member, carrying out the same roles but with the additional 'leader' responsibilities – as opposed to higher-level management which often has a separate job role altogether. They may also be considered line management. In order for a team to function successfully, the team leader must also motivate the team to "use their knowledge and skills to achieve the shared goals". When a team leader motivates a team, group members can function in a goal-oriented manner. A "team leader" is also someone who has the capability to drive performance within a group of people. Team leaders utilize their expertise, their peers, influence, and/or creativeness to formulate an effective team.

== Military position ==
In some militaries, notably the United States Army and United States Marine Corps, a team leader is the non-commissioned officer in charge of a fireteam. As the fireteam is the lowest echelon of organization in the military structure, by extension team leaders (or when applicable, assistant team leaders) are the first-line supervisors in the military. In the U.S. Army, a team leader is typically a Sergeant, while in the USMC a team leader is typically a Corporal.

== Corporate position ==
Team leaders tend to manage a group or team consisting of fewer people than a manager would.

The function of line manager and team manager are hybrid forms of leader and manager. They have a completely different job role than the team members and manage larger teams. The line manager and team manager report to middle or high management.

== Concertive style of management ==
While traditional leadership has maintained that one person generally leads several groups, each with their own leadership hierarchy, the concertive style of leadership gives the power to the group. While there will generally be a management group responsible for bigger decisions for the direction of the company or organization, the workers get to develop their own set of values and rules to govern themselves. This includes task division, problem solving, day-to-day functions, group prioritization, and internal conflict resolution. Instead of a manager or leader being responsible for producing the results, the management expects the burden to fall on each individual member of the group. By establishing a set of values, rules, and norms these groups can go on to manage themselves, usually with success.

=== Holacracy ===
In a holacracy people have multiple roles while increasing efficiency, confidence, and communication in the workplace. This model was adopted by Zappos because they had "gone from being a fast speedboat to a cruise ship". While many cite more work to do and the large learning curve as obstacles to implementing the system, most workers are happier than when they had a managerial system of organizational structure.

== See also ==
- Crew chief
- Squad leader
- Captain (sports)
