= Squad =

Military unit size designation

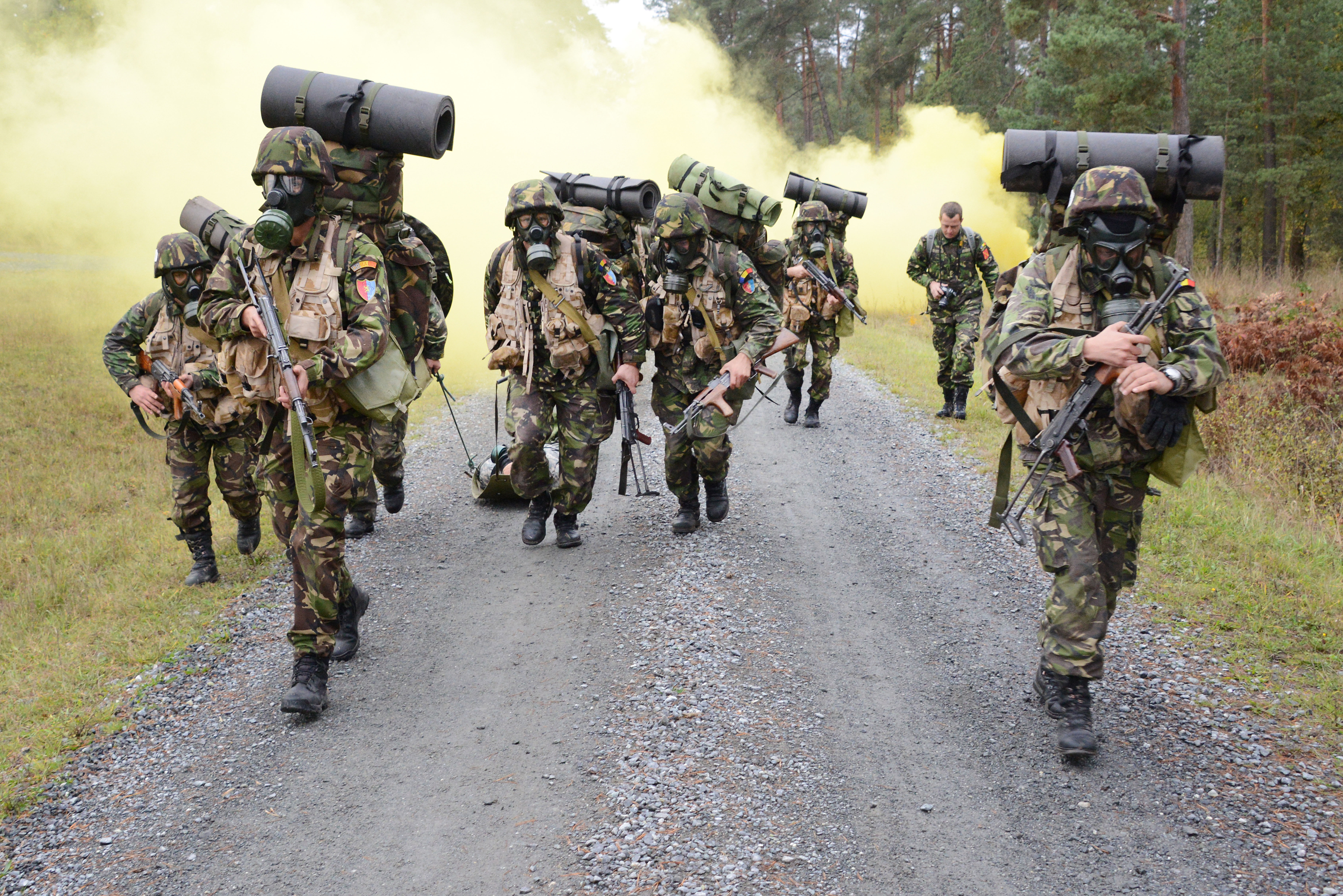
A squad of Romanian Land Forces soldiers with CBRN gear during a military exercise in October 2015

In military terminology, a squad is among the smallest of military organizations and is led by a non-commissioned officer. NATO and U.S. doctrine define a squad as an organization "larger than a team, but smaller than a section", while U.S. Army doctrine further defines a squad as a "small military unit typically containing two or more fire teams. It typically contains a dozen Soldiers or less." In the Australian, British and Canadian Armed Forces the equivalent of a squad is a section.

The Canadian Forces Manual of Drill and Ceremonial defines a squad as "a small military formation of less than platoon size which is adopted to teach drill movements. (escouade)".

A squad can also be an ad hoc group of soldiers assigned to a task, for example, a firing squad.

== Organization ==
NATO Map Symbols
A squad
A mechanized infantry squad
a military police dog squad
a light anti-tank squad

=== NATO military symbol ===
U.S. Army in Chapter 2 of Army Doctrine Publication No. 3-90 provides the following definitions for army echelons:

- a fire team is a small military unit typically containing four or fewer Soldiers; two or three fire teams are usually grouped into a squad or section
- a crew is a small military unit that consists of all personnel operating a particular system
- a squad is a small military unit typically containing two or more fire teams; in some cases, the crew of a system may also be designated as a squad
- a section is a tactical unit of the Army and Marine Corps smaller than a platoon and larger than a squad

U.S. Army Field Manual No. 1-02.2 in Table 2-3 and NATO standard APP-06 in Table 1-8 provide the following symbols for these echelons:

Echelon	Team / Crew	Squad	Section
Symbol	Ø	●	●●

In practice, the meaning of these symbols depends on the NATO member country. For example

- Table 2-3 in U.S. Army Field Manual No. 1-02.2 and U.S. designations in Annex B to APP-06 contain the note that Common English language definition also applies to symbol ●, “a small group engaged in a common effort or occupation”
- The Military English Guide v. 1.4, published by Swedish Defence University, makes no distinction between a section and a squad, designating them with the symbol ●●; a fire team is designated by the symbol ●

Symbols and names of squads (or their analogs) in NATO member armed forces:

Denmark	●	Gruppe
Italy	●	Squadra
Portugal	●	Esquadra
Slovakia	●	Družstvo
Turkey	●	Manga
United Kingdom	●	Section
United States	●	Squad
Spain	●	Escuadra (Note: based on the fact that the terms Squad/Team are translated into Spanish as Escuadra/Equipo)
Spain	●●	Pelotón (Note: this Spanish term usually translates as platoon, however, in the Spanish Army, pelotón is a small section, close in size to a squad)
Albania	●●	Skuadër
Bulgaria	●●	Otdelenie (Отделение)
Canada	●●	Section
Croatia	●●	Odred
Czechia	●●	Družstvo
Estonia	●●	Jagu
France	●●	Groupe
Germany	●●	Gruppe
Hungary	●●	Raj
Latvia	●●	Nodaļa
Lithuania	●●	Skyrius
Luxembourg	●●	Groupe
Norway	●●	Gruppe
Poland	●●	Drużyna

=== United States ===
==== United States Army ====
Historically, a "squad" in the US Army was a sub-unit of a section, consisting of from as few as two soldiers to as many as 9–10 soldiers and was originally used primarily for drill and administrative purposes (e.g., billeting, messing, working parties, etc.). The smallest tactical sub-unit being the section, which was also known as a half-platoon (the platoon itself being a half company).

Depending upon the time period, the squad "leader" (not an official position title until 1891) could be a sergeant (the sergeant, in sections with only one corporal, led the section's first squad, while the lone corporal served as assistant section leader and led the section's second squad), a corporal (in sections with two corporals), a lance corporal (a rank the Army had in varying numbers and conditions from at least 1821 until 1920), a private first class (PFC) (the rank existing since 1846 but not earning its one chevron – taken from the abolished lance corporal rank – until 1920). or even a "senior" private (there being many long-service, or "professional," privates until the post-WWII era).

In 1891, the US Army officially defined a rifle "squad" as consisting of "seven privates and one corporal." The US Army employed the eight-man rifle squad through WWI and until the late 1930s under the Square Division organizational plan, in which sergeants continued to lead sections consisting of two squads.

Under the Triangular Division organization plan in 1939 rifle squads were no longer organized into sections. Instead, the squads were reorganized into a 12-man unit of three elements, or teams, Able, Baker, and Charlie, reporting directly to the platoon commander (an officer, usually a second lieutenant), assisted by a sergeant assigned as the "assistant to platoon commander" (re-designated as "platoon leader" in 1940 and as "platoon sergeant" in 1943 with the officer then re-designated as "platoon leader".) The squad leader was still only a corporal but the squad was also assigned a PFC (one of the scout riflemen) as the assistant to the squad leader. This soldier could serve as either the squad leader's messenger to the platoon commander or could be used to relay orders to other squad elements, as needed. While not a noncommissioned officer (NCO) the PFC was an experienced soldier, as prior to WWII the majority of enlisted men remained privates for the entire term of their enlistment since promotion opportunity was scarce. However, the obvious command (viz., leadership and supervision) weakness of so large a squad under one NCO rapidly became obvious in light of the pre-war mobilization and was corrected in 1940 when a second NCO was added to the squad.

This adjustment raised the squad leader to a sergeant (grade 4) and the assistant squad leader to a corporal (grade 5). The "platoon leader" (with the officer still being the "platoon commander") now became a staff sergeant, (grade 3). (In 1920 the enlisted rank structure was simplified and seven grades were established ranging from master sergeant as grade 1 to private as grade 7; staff sergeant being one of the new rank titles then established by combining several intermediate sergeant grades ranking above section leaders but below the company first sergeant.) This squad organization included two men serving as “scout (rifleman),” who along with the squad leader, formed the security element (i.e., reconnaissance and overwatch actions), designated as “Able.” The second element was a three-man Browning Automatic Rifle (BAR) team consisting of an automatic rifleman, an assistant automatic rifleman and an ammunition bearer. This element formed the “base of fire” (viz., fire support in providing suppressive fires in the attack and protective fires in the defense) and was designated as “Baker.” Lastly, there were five riflemen and the assistant squad leader, who formed the “maneuver element” (e.g., flanking and assault movements in the attack and repelling and reinforcing actions in the defense), designated as “Charlie.”

In 1942, the Army had a massive restructuring of its Tables of Organization & Equipment (TO&Es) and increased the rank of the squad leader and assistant squad leader to staff sergeant and sergeant, respectively. (Platoon leaders now became technical sergeants, as grade 2, and first sergeants became equal in pay grade to master sergeants as grade 1.) The BAR man (automatic rifleman) and the senior rifleman of the Charlie element became corporals (grade 5) and de facto team leaders, even though not officially designated as such. (In 1943 NCO platoon leaders were re-designated as platoon sergeants and officer platoon commanders became platoon leaders.)

After WWII, in 1948, the Army decided to "downsize” the rifle squad to a nine-man organization (as well as realign its enlisted grade structure), as post-war analysis had shown that the 12-man squad was too large and unwieldy in combat. The squad leader was again called a sergeant (but retained the grade 3 pay grade and insignia of the rank of a staff sergeant, which was then eliminated.) The two scouts of the Able element were eliminated with the idea that all of the riflemen should be able to perform the scouting duties and would therefore all share in the associated inherent risk of that position. The Baker element's ammunition bearer was also eliminated, leaving the two-man BAR team as the base of fire, supervised by the assistant squad leader (again called a corporal), but remaining as a grade 4, since the rank of sergeant (three chevrons) was then eliminated. (PFC became grade 5, private was grade 6, and recruit was grade 7; PFCs wore one chevron and privates and recruits both wore none.) The five riflemen of the “Charlie” team, now led by the squad leader, remained as the maneuver element.

Also, in 1948, the rank title of the platoon sergeant changed from technical sergeant (which was eliminated) to sergeant first class (SFC) (grade 2) and the rank title of first sergeant was again eliminated, being retained only as an occupational title for the senior NCO of a company. In 1951 the pay grades were reversed, with master sergeant becoming E-7 (vice the previous grade 1) and sergeant first class becoming E-6, so that the squad leader became a sergeant (E-5) and the assistant squad leader, a corporal (E-4). (With PFC, PVT, and RCT being E-3, E-2, and E-1, respectively.)

In the 1956 the Army began reorganizing into its "Pentomic” plan under the ROCID (Reorganization of Current Infantry Divisions) TO&Es. The rifle squad was reorganized into an eleven-man organization with a sergeant (E-5) as squad leader and two five-man fire teams. Each fire team consisted of a corporal (E-4) team leader, an automatic rifleman, an assistant automatic rifleman, a grenadier, and a scout-rifleman. The assistant squad leader position was eliminated, with the senior fire team leader now filling this role as needed.

In 1958, with the addition of the E-8 and E-9 pay grades, the ranks of the squad and fire team leaders changed again, now to staff sergeant (E-6) and sergeant (E-5), respectively. The 1958 restructuring restored the traditional sergeant and staff sergeant rank insignia of three chevrons and three chevrons over an inverted arc, respectively. (Platoon sergeant became a separate rank title, and along with SFC, became E-7; first sergeants and master sergeants became pay grade E-8. Also, the rank of sergeant major was revived as E-9, with a new distinctive rank insignia consisting of the three chevrons and three inverted arcs of a master sergeant/first sergeant but replacing the first sergeant's lozenge with a star.)

Under the ROAD (Reorganization Objective Army Divisions) structure in 1963, the rifle squad was reduced to a ten-man organization. This iteration of the rifle squad retained the two fire teams but eliminated the two scouts (one in each fire team), instead providing the squad leader with one extra rifleman, who could be used to reinforce either fire team or assist the squad leader as required. An exception was in mechanized infantry units, where an additional rifleman (increasing the squad to eleven members) was assigned as the driver of the squad's M113 armored personnel carrier. (Also, in 1968, the separate rank title of platoon sergeant was eliminated, leaving SFC as the only E-7 rank.)

Currently, US Army rifle squads consist of nine soldiers, organized under a squad leader into two four-man fire teams. The squad leader is a staff sergeant (E-6) and the two fire team leaders are sergeants (E-5). Mechanized infantry and Stryker infantry units are equipped with M2A3 Bradley infantry fighting vehicles and M1126 Stryker infantry carrier vehicles, respectively. Unlike the ROAD era mechanized infantry units, none of the vehicle crewman (M2A3 – three, M1126 – two) are counted as part of the nine-man rifle squad transported by the vehicles. The term squad is also used in infantry crew-served weapons sections (number of members varies by weapon), military police (twelve soldiers including a squad leader divided into four three-man teams, with three team leaders), and combat engineer units. Cavalry scout squads consist of six men divided into two teams (each with a team leader and two scouts) while infantry scout squads consist of eight men divided into two three-man teams (each with two scouts and one radio operator) plus a team leader and assistant team leader.

==== United States Marine Corps ====
In the United States Marine Corps, a rifle squad is usually composed of three fireteams of four Marines each and a squad leader who is typically a sergeant or corporal, Other types of USMC infantry squads include: machinegun (7.62 mm), heavy machinegun (12.7 mm (.50 cal.) and 40 mm), LWCMS mortar (60 mm), 81 mm mortar, assault weapon (SMAW), antiarmor (Javelin missile), and anti-tank (TOW missile). These squads range from as few as three Marines (60 mm LWCM squad) to as many as eight (Javelin missile squad), depending upon the weapon system with which the squad is equipped. Squads are also used in reconnaissance, light armored reconnaissance (scout dismounts), combat engineer, law enforcement (i.e., military police), Marine Security Force Regiment (MSFR), and Fleet Antiterrorism Security Team (FAST) companies. On 9 May 2018, it was announced that a USMC squad would be reduced to 12 Marines, with three fire teams of three Marines each with two new positions: an assistant squad leader and a squad systems operator. Beginning in 2019, the structure had been changed to 15 men; assistant automatic riflemen were replaced with grenadiers and anti mechanized infantry became a new addition to Marine fireteams. All M16A4 rifles and M4A1 carbines were to be replaced with the M27 infantry automatic rifle. Depending on the mission, automatic rifleman may use the M249 light machine gun instead of the M27 IAR. In April 2025, the Marine Corps returned to a 13-man squad structure.

==== United States Air Force ====
In the U.S. Air Force Security Forces, a squad is made up of three fire teams of four members, each led by a senior airman, staff sergeant, or tech sergeant.

==== Fire service in the United States ====
A squad is a term used in the US Fire and EMS services to describe several types of units and emergency apparatus. Oftentimes, the names "squad" and "rescue squad" are used interchangeably, however the function of the squad is different from department to department. In some departments, a "squad" and a "rescue" are two distinct units. This is the case in New York City, where the FDNY operates eight squad companies. These special "enhanced" engine companies perform both "truck" and "engine" company tasks, as well as hazardous materials (Hazmat) mitigation and other specialty rescue functions. FDNY's five "rescue" companies primarily mitigate technical and heavy rescue incidents, and operate as a pure special rescue unit. Squads and rescues within the FDNY are part of the departments specialty operations command (SOC).

In other departments, a squad is a name given to a type of apparatus that delivers EMS and rescue services, and is staffed by firefighter/EMTs or firefighter/paramedics. This type of service delivery is common in the greater Los Angeles area of California, and was made famous in the 1970s show Emergency!, where the fictional Squad 51 highlighted the lives of two firefighter/paramedics of the LACoFD.

=== Chinese National Revolutionary Army ===
The squad (班), or section was the basic unit of the National Revolutionary Army (of the National Government of the Republic of China), and would usually be 14 men strong. An infantry squad from an elite German-trained division would ideally have one light machine gun and 10 rifles, but only one of the three squads in a non-elite Central Army division would have a light machine gun. Furthermore, the regular provincial army divisions often had no machine guns at all.

=== Denmark ===
A Danish mechanized or armoured infantry squad (gruppe) consists of 4-5 privates, a sergeant, and sometimes a corporal - 6 members in total. The squad consists of two teams each containing three members.

When marching in single file, the squad members, from front to rear consist of:

- Team 2 (Hold 2)
  - Let maskingeværskytte 2 (LMG2). Pointman. Armed with an M/60.
  - Gevær 2 (GV2). Rifleman and primary AT gunner. Armed with an M/10 and an AT4. Can be outfitted with a grenade launcher.
  - Gruppefører (GF). Squad leader, sergeant. Armed with an M/10.
- Team 1 (Hold 1)
  - Gevær 1 (GV1). Rifleman and squad second-in-command, either a private or corporal. Also known as Bravo. Armed with an M/10 and a grenade launcher.
  - Gevær 3 (GV3). Rifleman, combat life saver and secondary AT gunner. Armed with an M/10 and occasionally an AT4.
  - Let maskingeværskytte 1 (LMG1). Last man. Armed with an M/60.

=== German Army ===
==== Bundeswehr ====
The equivalent to squad is the Gruppe, a sub-unit of 8 to 12 soldiers, in the German Bundeswehr, Austrian Bundesheer and Swiss Army.

==== Wehrmacht ====
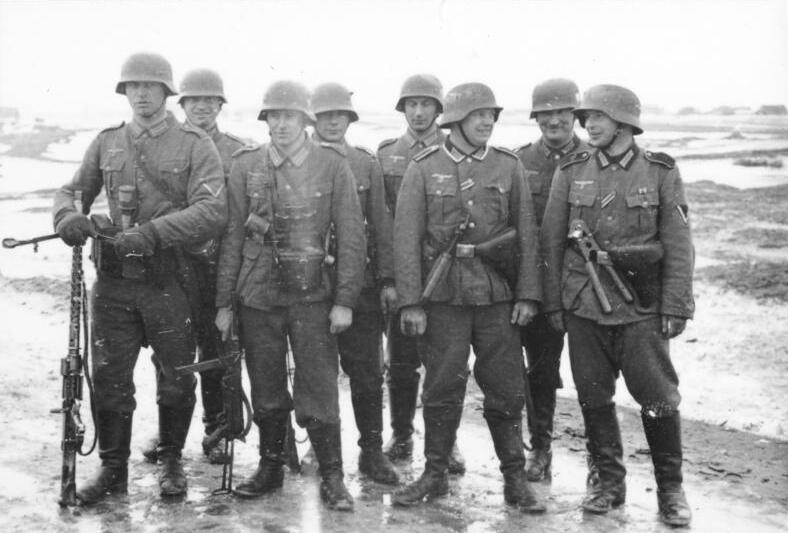
A Wehrmacht infantry Gruppe with the MG 34 in the light machine gun role

During World War II the German infantry Gruppe was mainly a general purpose machine gun (GPMG) based unit. The advantage of the GPMG concept was that it added greatly to the overall volume of fire that could be put out by a squad-sized unit. The MG 34 or MG 42 GPMGs were normally used in the LMG (light machine gun) role. An infantry Gruppe consisted of generally nine or ten men; a non-commissioned officer (Unteroffizier) squad leader, deputy squad leader, a two-man machine gun element (machine gunner and assistant gunner) and four to six riflemen.

As personal small arms the squad leader was issued a rifle (as of around 1941 a submachine gun such as the MP 40), the machine gunner and his assistant were issued pistols and the deputy squad leader and the riflemen were issued rifles. The riflemen carried additional ammunition, hand grenades, explosive charges or a machine gun tripod as required. The riflemen would provide security and covering fire for the machine gun element. Two of the standard issue bolt-action Karabiner 98k rifles in the squad could be replaced with semi-automatic Gewehr 43 rifles and occasionally, StG-44 "assault" rifles could be used to re-arm the whole squad, besides the machine-gun.

=== Soviet Union ===
In the Soviet Armed Forces, a motorised rifle squad was mounted in either a BTR armoured personnel carrier or BMP infantry fighting vehicle, with the former being more numerous by the late 1980s. BTR rifle squads consisted of a squad leader/BTR commander, senior rifleman/assistant squad leader, a machine gunner armed with an RPK-74, a grenadier armed with an RPG-7, a rifleman/assistant grenadier, a rifleman/medic, a rifleman, a BTR driver/mechanic and a BTR machine gunner.

BMP rifle squads consisted of a squad leader/BMP commander, assistant squad leader/BMP gunner, a BMP driver/mechanic, a machine gunner armed with an RPK-74, a grenadier armed with an RPG-7, a rifleman/assistant grenadier, a rifleman/medic, a senior rifleman and a rifleman all armed with AKMs or AK-74s. Within a platoon the rifleman in one of the squads was armed with an SVD sniper rifle. In both BTR and BMP squads the vehicle's gunner and driver stayed with the vehicle while the rest of the squad dismounted.

=== Spanish Army ===
The Spanish Army is made up of the following sub-subunits:

- Squad (Spanish: Escuadra), consisting of a corporal and 2–4 soldiers
- Section (Spanish: Pelotón), consisting of two squads and commanded by a corporal or sergeant.

Escuadra formations can be divided according to the weapon they use into:

- Rifle squad: Made up of a corporal and 3–4 soldiers. Their weapon is the combat rifle.
- Machine gun squad: Made up of a corporal, who carries a machine gun, and 2–3 soldiers. Their personal weapon is the combat rifle, except for the machine gun corporal, who carries a pistol.
- Mortar squad: There are 2–3 soldiers who carry grenades for the mortar. Their weapons are rifles, except for the corporal, who carries a submachine gun.
- Grenade launcher squad: A corporal carries the grenade launcher (a bazooka-type tube), and 2–3 soldiers carry the grenades. Their weapons are rifles, except for the corporal, who carries a submachine gun.

=== Swedish Army ===
The squad, grupp, in the Swedish army is organized as follows during offensive missions, according to Markstridsreglemente 3 Grupp (Ground combat regulation 3 Squad):

- Gruppchef – squad leader.
- Ställföreträdande gruppchef – deputy squad leader.
- 2 soldater tillika kulspruteskyttar – two machine-gunners.
- 2 soldater tillika pansarskottsskyttar – two riflemen with anti-tank launcher. (Typically a Pansarskott m/86).
- 1 soldat tillika skarpskytt. – one marksman.
- 1 soldat tillika stridssjukvårdare – one combat medic.

During defensive missions, the two soldiers with anti-tank launchers are armed with a Granatgevär m/48 or m/86 instead, where one is gunner and the second loader.

==== Mechanized infantry (Strf 9040A) ====
In accordance with Brigadreglemente Armén Pansar-/Mekskyttepluton/-grupp 90 (Army Brigade Regulation Armor-/Mechanized Rifle Platoon/Squad 90) from 2002:

- Vagnschef – vehicle commander
- Skytt – vehicle gunner
- Förare – vehicle driver
- Gruppchef – squad leader
- Ställföreträdande gruppchef – deputy squad leader
- 2 Kulspruteskyttar – two machine-gunners
- 1 Granatgevärsskytt – one recoilless rifle gunner
- 1 Granatgevärsladd – one recoilless rifle loader

The squad has access to six Pansarskott m/86s, two Kulspruta 58Bs, and one Granatgevär m/48.

== Leadership ==
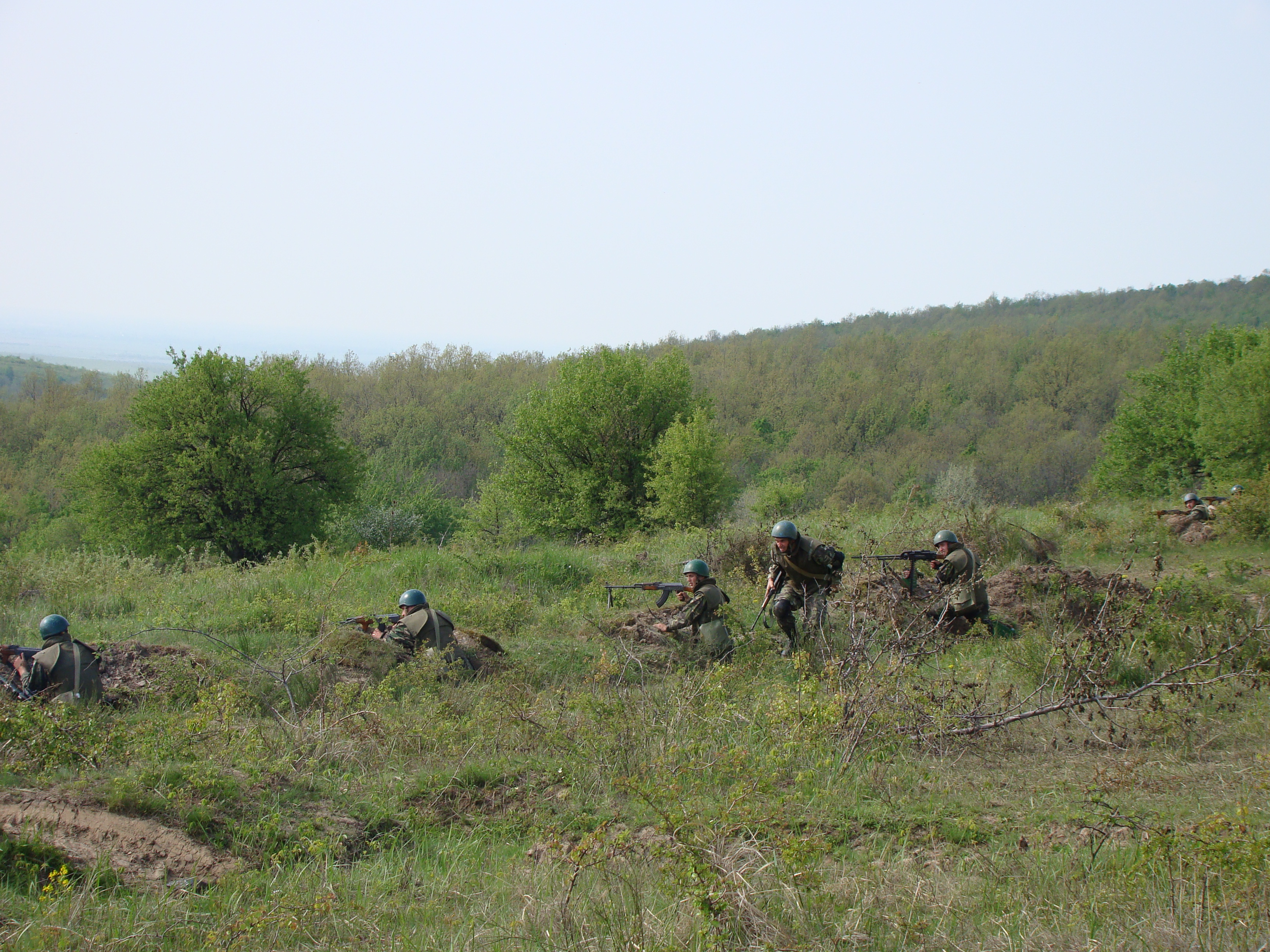
A Romanian squad of a TAB-77 APC in 2010. This is a typical Soviet arrangement, with a PK general purpose machine gun and a RPK light machine gun in the center and two soldiers with AK-47 assault rifles and one RPG-7 grenade launcher on the flanks. Another soldier provides liaison or extra firepower where needed.

A squad is led by a non-commissioned officer known as a "squad leader". His or her second in command is known as an "assistant squad leader". In Britain and in the Commonwealth, these appointments are known as "section commander" and "section 2IC" (second in command), respectively. In the US military, a squad leader is a non-commissioned officer who leads a squad of typically nine soldiers (US Army: squad leader and two fireteams of four men each) or 13 marines (US Marine Corps: squad leader and three fireteams of four men each) in a rifle squad, or three to eight men in a crew-served weapons squad. In the United States Army the TO&E rank of a rifle squad leader is staff sergeant (E-6, or OR-6) and in the United States Marine Corps the TO rank is sergeant (E-5, or OR-5), though a corporal may also act as a squad leader in the absence of sufficient numbers of sergeants. Squad leaders of crew-served weapons squads range from corporal through staff sergeant, depending upon the branch of service and type of squad. In some armies, notably those of the British Commonwealth, in which the term section is used for units of this size, the NCO in charge, which in the British Army and Royal Marines is normally a corporal (OR-4), is termed a section commander.

== See also ==
- Contubernium
- Military organizations
- Organization of Canadian Army rifle sections during World War II
- Squadron
