= Patrol =

Type of personnel group

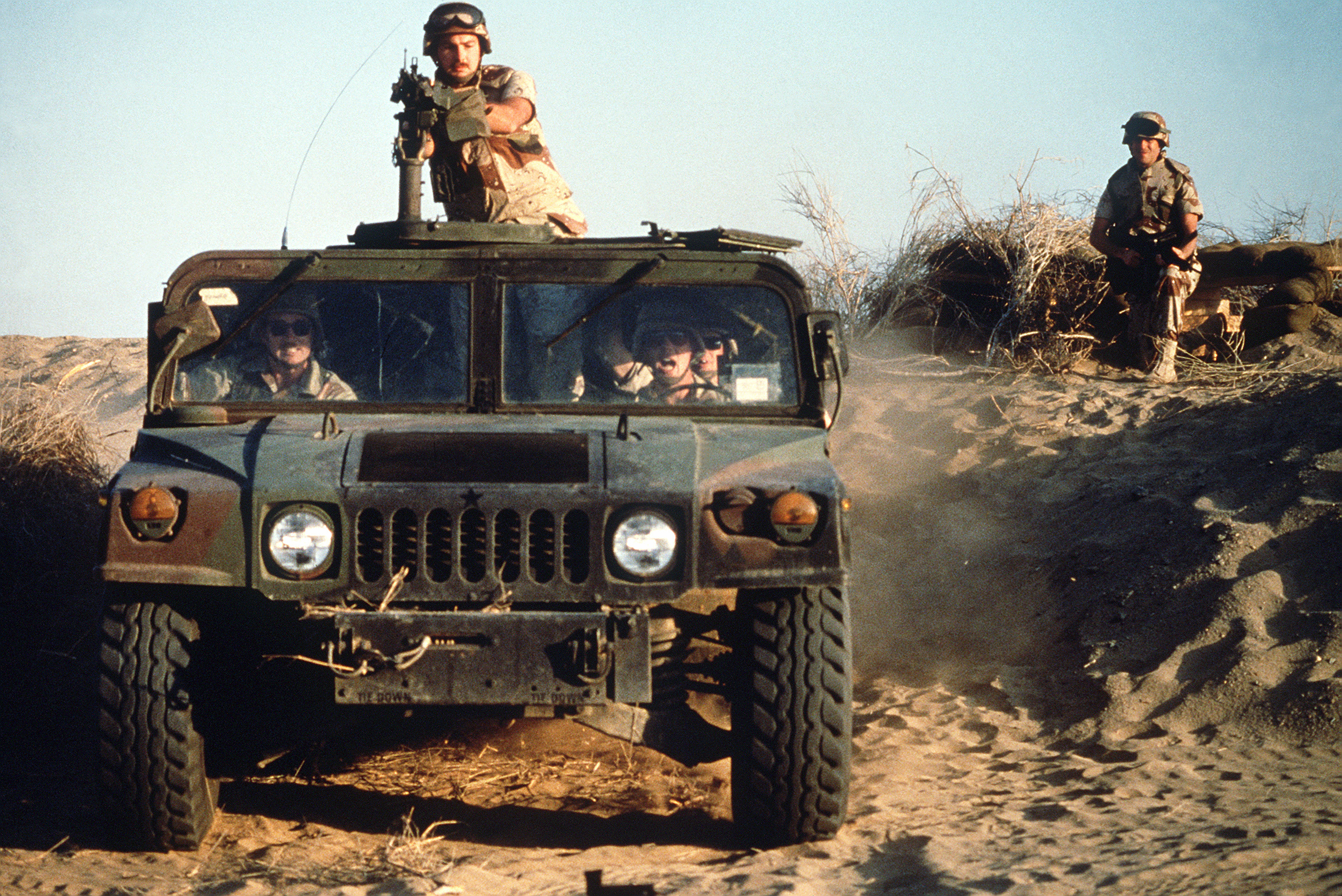
United States Air Force Security Forces personnel patrolling during the Gulf War

A patrol is commonly a group of personnel, such as law enforcement officers, military personnel, or security personnel, that are assigned to monitor or secure a specific geographic area.

== Etymology ==
The word "patrol" is derived from the French word patrouiller, itself derived from the Old French word patouiller meaning "to paddle, paw about, patrol", which is in turn from patte, "a paw".

== Military ==
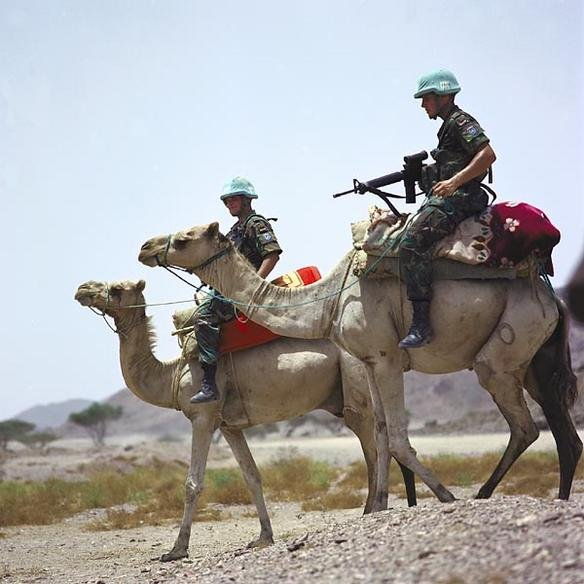
UN Peacekeepers in Eritrea patrolling the Eritrea–Ethiopia border

In military tactics, a patrol is a sub-subunit or small tactical formation, sent out from a military organization by land, sea or air for the purpose of combat, reconnaissance, or a combination of both. The basic task of a patrol is to follow a known route with the purpose of investigating some feature of interest or, in the assignment of a fighting patrol (U.S. combat patrol), to find and engage the enemy. A patrol can also mean a small cavalry or armoured unit, subordinate to a troop or platoon, usually comprising a section or squad of mounted troops, or two armoured fighting vehicles (often tanks).

== Law enforcement ==
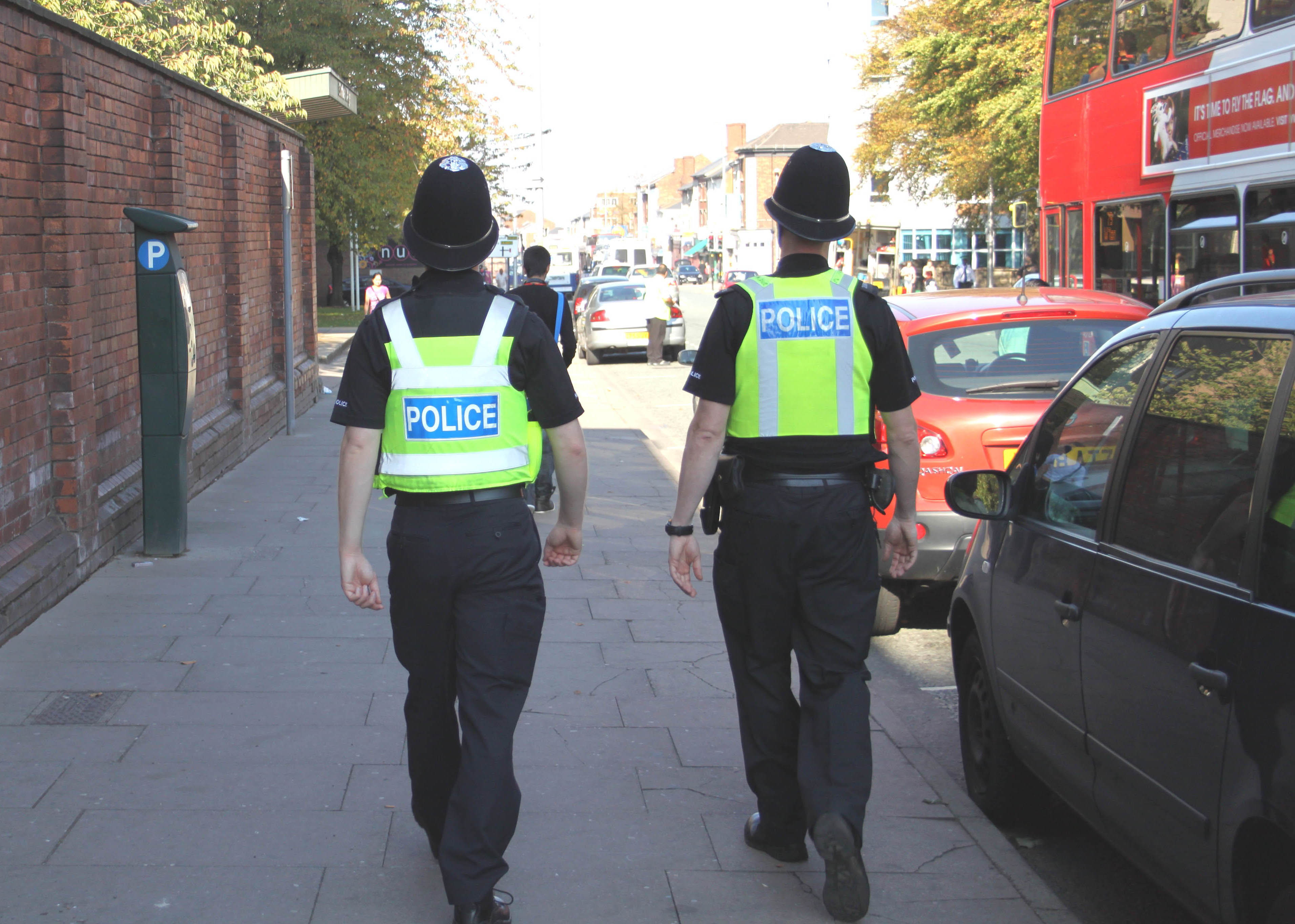
West Midlands Police officers on foot patrol in West Bromwich, England

In non-military law enforcement, patrol officers are police officers (or, for private entities, security guards) assigned to monitor specified geographic areas. In this instance, patrol refers to the action of patrolling—that is, to move through their assigned areas at regular intervals to detect or prevent violations of the law or problems of any kind.

Patrol officers are the most recognizable members of the police, and are the government officials encountered most frequently by the public. Their duties include responding to calls for service, making arrests, resolving disputes, issuing tickets, taking crime reports, conducting traffic enforcement, investigating crimes, and conducting crime prevention measures. A patrol officer is often the first responder on the scene of any incident, and their actions can greatly affect the outcome of the investigation, as well as the lives and safety of themselves and others. Patrols are often done with the intent of community policing, to improve relations between police and the public.

Patrol officers may conduct patrols on foot, while mounted, riding a police motorcycle or bicycle, driving a police car, crewing a police watercraft, or piloting a police aircraft, depending on the unit they are assigned to or their agency's capabilities. They may or may not be armed or uniformed. A study conducted by Temple University and the Philadelphia Police Department in the mid-2000s has shown that foot patrols reduce crime more than other methods.

== Non-law enforcement patrols ==
=== Schools ===
Some elementary schools utilize the term patrol to refer to students who are selected to monitor safety in the classroom or to those students who assist crossing guards with safety of children crossing busy nearby streets. Another common term for this use of patrol is hall monitor.

=== Scouting ===
In Scouting, a patrol is six to eight Scouts (youth members) under the leadership of one of their number who is appointed Patrol Leader and supported by a Second or Assistant Patrol Leader. This is the basic unit of a Scout troop. The patrol method is an essential characteristic of Scouting by which it differs from all other organizations, using the natural dynamics of the gang for an educational purpose.

== See also ==
- Maritime patrol
- Combat air patrol
