= Organization of Canadian Army rifle sections during World War II =

During the Second World War, the Canadian Army used the rifle section as its smallest organized formation of combat infantry soldiers. The organization was substantially similar to that of the Australian Army and the British Army with three sections to the platoon and three platoons to the rifle company.

== Section composition ==
The section was led by a corporal armed with a submachine gun (the Thompson Sub-machine gun at the beginning of the war and the Sten Gun starting to replace it from 1942 for the remainder), with the second in command being a lance-corporal, who had the responsibility of positioning the two-man Bren light machine gun team (one man firing, the other loading). The Bren team was responsible for the operation of the Light Machine Gun (LMG). During combat, this three man element would provide a base of covering fire while the remainder of the section (six privates armed with the No. 4 Lee–Enfield Rifle, and their corporal commanding) would flank the enemy in an effort to either capture or kill them.

== Flanking element ==
The corporal carried five magazines for his sub-machine gun; these would have had 20 rounds of .45 ACP ammunition in the case of the Thompson or 32 rounds of 9mm ammunition for the Sten. He would also carry two grenades; the most common type being the No.36M (known as the "Mills Bomb").

The remaining privates would be armed with the 10-shot No.4 Mk I Lee–Enfield bolt-action rifle and the accompanying spike bayonet. They would each carry 50 rounds of .303 ammunition in five round stripper clips, as well as one Mills bomb.

== Light Machine Gun element ==
The Lance-corporal would have been armed similarly to the privates, except he was also outfitted with a machete. This was used to create a vantage point for the LMG if there was a need for a position within a densely wooded area. In addition to carrying the standard 50 rounds of Enfield rifle ammunition, he would also carry four 30 round magazines for the Bren gun (which also used the .303 rifle cartridge). The Lance-corporal would have been the only one within the machine gun element to carry a Mills bomb; this would likely have been used in the event that his position was being overrun.

The private responsible for firing the Bren was known as a “Number One” and was not required to carry a rifle as the Bren itself weighed a cumbersome 22 pounds. He was required to carry four magazines of LMG ammunition and the “Bren wallet”, which was a small cleaning kit for his weapon.

The one loading the LMG was known as the “Number Two” and was armed with a Lee–Enfield rifle and 50 rounds of ammunition. Due to his role alongside the Number One, he would also have to carry four Bren gun magazines and a case containing a spare barrel for the LMG and any extra parts that might be required (such as springs, screws etc.)

The small-scale tactic of using a fire base with a flanking group was also employed on a larger scale by a platoon, with, for example, one section acting as a fire base, while the other two flank a position.
