= Sub-subunit =

Type of military unit

Sub-subunit or sub-sub-unit is a subordinated element below platoon level of company-sized units or sub-units which normally might not be separately identified in authorization documents by name, number, or letter. Fireteams, squads, crews, sections and patrols are typically sub-subunits.

== Types of sub-units ==
Sub-subunits (de: Teileinheit; ru: подразделение/podrazdelenie) in various languages and armed forces
NATO symbol		Bundeswehr			English	French	Russian	Polish
Icon	Description	Designation	Structure	Commander/leader	English	French	Russian	Polish
	one dot over framed unit icon	Trupp	2–7 men, Tank crew	Unteroffizier ⇒ Hauptgefreiter	Squad	Equipe; Equipage	Группа (gruppa); Звено (zveno); Расчёт (raschot)	Drużyna
	Two dots over framed unit icon	Gruppe, Halbzug	8–12 men, 2 tank crews	Oberfeldwebel ⇒ Unteroffizier	Section	Groupe; Patrouille	Отделе́ние (otdelenie); Экипаж (ekipazh); Расчёт (raschot)	Drużyna; Załoga; Działon
	Two dots over framed unit icon	Rotte	2 aircraft	Oberfeldwebel ⇒ Unteroffizier	Two-ship flight/Pair	Patrouille légère	Пара (para)	N.N.
	Three dots over framed unit icon	Zug, Hörsaal	ca. 40 men	Hauptmann ⇒ Hauptfeldwebel	Platoon	Section	Взвод (vzvod)	Pluton
	Three dots over framed unit icon	Schwarm/Kette	3–4 aircraft	Hauptmann ⇒ Hauptfeldwebel	Flight	Patrouille; Peloton	Звено (zveno)	Klucz
	four dots over framed unit icon	Staffel		Hauptmann ⇒ Hauptfeldwebel	Echelon	Escadrille		Eskadra

Legend:

- Army
- Air Force
