= Section (military unit) =

Military unit size designation

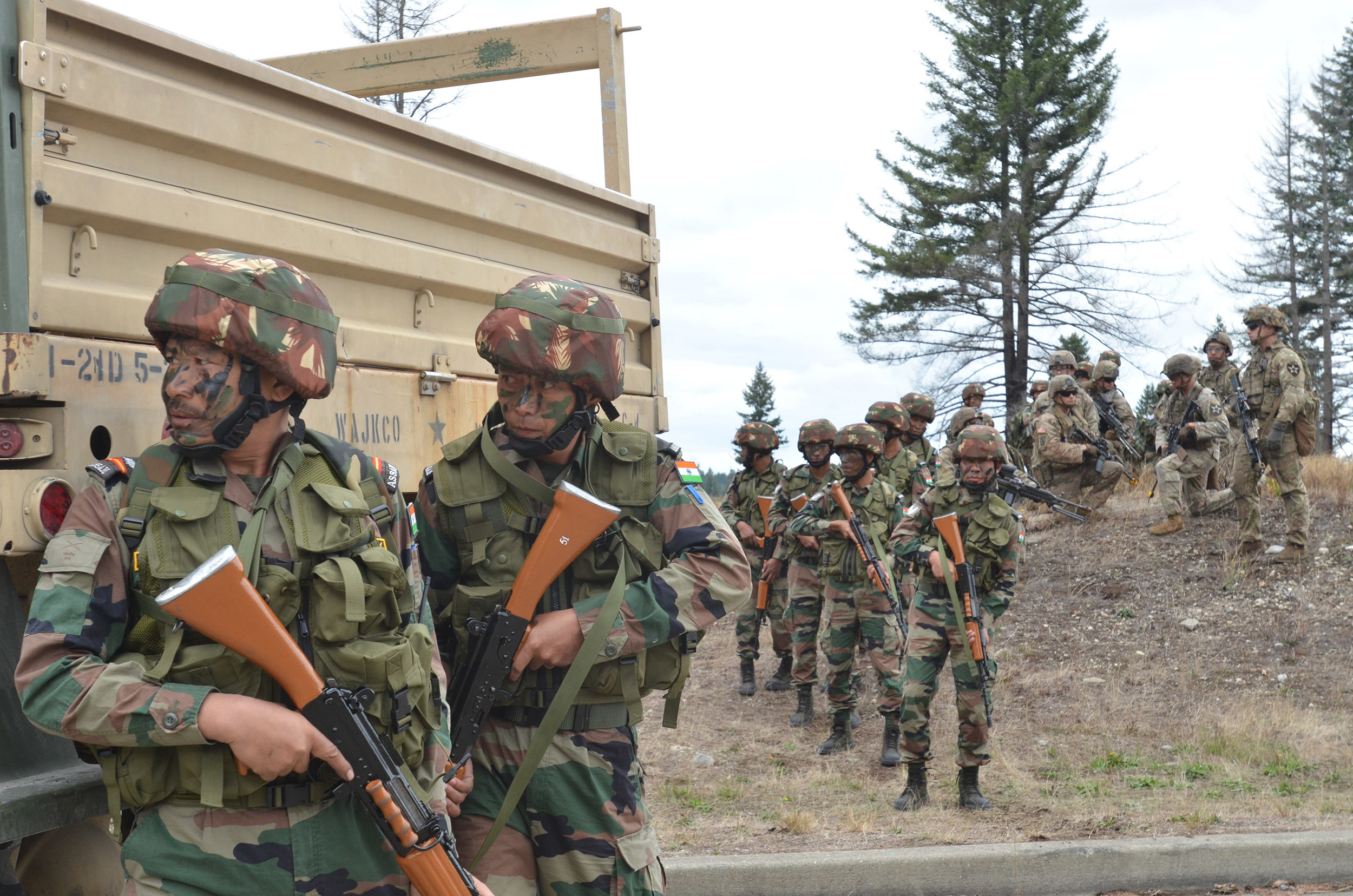
U.S. Army and Indian Army soldiers, numbering roughly the size of a section, during a military exercise

A section is a military sub-subunit. It usually consists of between 6 and 20 personnel. NATO and U.S. doctrine define a section as an organization "larger than a squad, but smaller than a platoon". As such, two or more sections usually make up an army platoon or an air force flight.

In the Australian, British and Canadian Armed Forces section is an equivalent to an infantry squad:

- the Canadian Army infantry section contains 2 four-Soldier assault group
- the Australian / British Army infantry section contains 2 four-Soldier fire teams
- the U.S. Army Infantry squad also contains 2 four-Soldier fire teams

In this regard, in a number of Slavic languages the morphological equivalent of the word "section" (a separate part of an organization; Belarusian: аддзяленне, Bulgarian: отделение, Russian: отделение, Rusyn: удділеня, Ukrainian: відділення) in military affairs also means squad. Similarly, the official English versions (Soldier's Guide) of the Finnish military handbook Sotilaan käsikirja have used the word "section" to describe the ryhmä sub-subunit despite said sub-subunit's size and role being closer to that of a NATO squad, with this wording persisting in the edition published after Finland's 2023 accession to NATO.

At the same time, in a number of Romance languages the phonetic analogue of the word "section" (French: section, Spanish: sección, Romanian: secţie, Italian: sezione) in military affairs means platoon or a sub-unit similar to a platoon.

In some air forces, a section is a unit containing three to four aircraft (if it is a flying unit) and up to 20 personnel. In the U.S. Space Force two or more guardians form a section.

== Land forces ==
=== NATO military symbol ===
NATO Map Symbols
A section
A mechanized infantry section
a psychological operations section
a light anti-tank section

U.S. Army in Chapter 2 of Army Doctrine Publication No. 3-90 provides the following definitions for army echelons:

- а fire team is a small military unit typically containing four or fewer Soldiers; a fire team is usually grouped by two or three teams into a squad or section
- а crew is a small military unit that consists of all personnel operating a particular system
- а squad is a small military unit typically containing two or more fire teams; in some cases, the crew of a system may also be designated as a squad
- а section is a tactical unit of the Army and Marine Corps smaller than a platoon and larger than a squad; a section may consist of the crews of two or more Army systems, such as a tank section or several fire teams

U.S. Army Field Manual No. 1-02.2 in Table 2-3 and NATO standard APP-06 in Table 1-8 provide the following symbols for these echelons:

| Echelon | Team / Crew | Squad | Section |
| Symbol | Ø | ● | ●● |

In practice, the meaning of these symbols depends on the NATO member country. For example

- Table 2–3 in U.S. Army Field Manual No. 1-02.2 and U.S. designations in Annex B to APP-06 contain the note that Common English language definition also applies to symbol ●, “a small group engaged in a common effort or occupation”
- The Military English Guide v. 1.4, published by Swedish Defence University, makes no distinction between a section and a squad, designating them with the symbol ●●; a fire team is designated by the symbol ●

National designation for symbol ●● in NATO member armed forces:

Use ●● for units larger than a squad
| Denmark | Sektion |
| Portugal | Secção |
| Slovakia | Sekcia (Note: non-existent in the Slovak Armed Forces) |
| Turkey | Kol |
| United Kingdom | (No equivalent) (Note: non-existent in the British Army) |
| United States | Section |

Use ●● for squad size units
| Albania | Skuadër |
| Bulgaria | Otdelenie (Отделение) |
| Canada | Section |
| Croatia | Odred |
| Czechia | Družstvo |
| Estonia | Jagu |
| France | Groupe |
| Germany | Gruppe |
| Hungary | Raj |
| Latvia | Komanda |
| Lithuania | Skyrius |
| Luxembourg | Groupe |
| Norway | Gruppe |
| Poland | Drużyna |
| Spain | Pelotón (Note: this Spanish term usually translates as platoon, however, in the Spanish Army, pelotón is a small section, close in size to a squad) |

Use ●● for other purposes
| France | Patrouille | Patrol (reconnaissance) |
| Germany | Rotte | Pair (army aviation) |
| Hungary | Kezelőszemélyzet | Crew (armour, infantry) |
| Italy | Pattuglia | Patrol (may range from squad to platoon) (Note: this formation is not an organic unit; a comparable unit is organized on a case-bycase basis in accordance with the task) |

=== Australian Army ===
At the start of World War I, the Australian Army used a section that consisted of 27 men including the section commander, a sergeant.

During World War II, a rifle section comprised ten soldiers with a corporal in command and a lance-corporal as his second-in-command. The corporal used an M1928 Thompson submachine gun, while one of the privates used a Bren gun. The other eight soldiers all used No.1 Mk.3 Lee–Enfield rifles with a bayonet and scabbard. They all carried two or three No.36 Mills bomb grenades.

After World War II, and during the Vietnam War, a rifle section consisted of ten personnel comprising a command and scout group (three people – two sub-machineguns/M16A1 and a L1A1 SLR); a gun group (three people – an M60 machine gun and two L1A1 SLRs) and a rifle group (four people – L1A1 SLRs). The section was later reduced to nine men, and consisted of the section commander, a two-man scout group, the section 2IC and two other men in the gun group, and a three-man rifle group; the section commander would usually move with the latter.

Under the new structure of the infantry platoon, Australian Army sections are made up of eight men divided into two four-man fireteams. Each fireteam consists of a team leader (corporal/lance-corporal), a marksman with enhanced optics, a grenadier with an M203 grenade launcher and an LSW operator with an F89 Minimi light support weapon.

Typical fire team structure:

| Position | Armament |
|---|---|
| Team leader | F88 Steyr |
| Marksman | F88 Steyr w/enhanced optic (e.g. 3.4× Wildcat) |
| Grenadier | F88 Steyr w/M203 under-barrel grenade launcher |
| Machine gunner | F89 Minimi |

=== British military ===
A section in the British Armed Forces is equivalent to a NATO squad, and the British Army has no organization equivalent to a NATO section.

==== British Army rifle, Lewis gun, and bomber sections (World War I) ====
The February 1917 document Instructions for the Training of Platoons for Offensive Action described the following section organisations as being "suitable" for an infantry platoon that had thirty-six other ranks:

- One section of bombers, with one NCO and eight other ranks (to include two bayonet men and two bombers)
- One section of Lewis gunners, with one NCO and eight other ranks (to include the Lewis Gun No. 1 and No. 2)
- One section of riflemen, with one NCO and eight other ranks (with the men being split up into "picked" shots, scouts, and bayonet fighters)
- One section of rifle bombers, with one NCO and eight other ranks (to include four bomb firers)

All of these men were to be equipped with a Lee-Enfield rifle (except for the Lewis Gun No. 1) and to have bayonets fixed (except for the Lewis Gun No. 2 and rifle bombers if using a cup discharger (Note: All men with rifles were to fix bayonets in the assault, however.)). Most men were to carry at least two Mills bombs; in the bomber section, each designated bomber carried five bombs and the other men at least ten bombs each, while each man in the rifle bomber section carried at least six of the Mills bomb's rifle grenade variant. The Lewis gun section as a whole carried thirty magazines with which to feed that weapon.

==== British Army rifle and Lewis gun sections (Interbellum) ====
Immediately after the First World War, the odd-numbered sections of an infantry platoon were designated as rifle sections while even-numbered sections were designated as Lewis gun sections. Both types of section consisted of an NCO and six other ranks. The rifle section was armed with Lee-Enfield rifles, Mills bombs (one each for the first three other ranks), and smoke grenades (one each for the first three other ranks, two each for the next three other ranks who also had one grenade discharger each). The Lewis gun section had one other rank armed with the eponymous machine gun and another carrying the spare parts bag; both of these other ranks also carried revolvers. The remaining members of the Lewis gun section carried Lee-Enfield rifles and a varying number of magazines for the Lewis gun (the section commander and the other rank with the Lewis gun carried one magazine each, the other rank with the spare parts bag carried two magazines, and the remaining other ranks carried four magazines each). In the mid-1930s, the formal separation between the two types of section was abolished, with all of the infantry platoon's sections being scaled to operate as a rifle section or a light machine gun section depending on the company commander's orders; additionally, one other rank per section was nominated to be second-in-command.

==== British Army rifle section (World War II) ====
The rifle section of a Second World War-era infantry platoon was generally formed of a corporal as the section commander, a lance corporal as the section 2iC from April 1943 onwards, and a varying number of private soldiers depending on the year of the war. The corporal variously carried a Lee-Enfield rifle, a Thompson submachine gun, (Note: Both this and the Sten were referred to as "machine carbines" in the British parlance of the day, though the Thompson was initially referred to as a submachine gun) or a Sten submachine gun, again depending on the year of the war, (Note: The Thompson entered service in 1940; while initial stocks were mostly destined for the Home Guard and then the Commandos, some did enter regular Army service in time for the Battle of France. The Sten entered service in 1941 but did not immediately replace the Thompson, and even as the Sten became more and more common some units such as the Eighth Army continued to use the Thompson as their primary submachine gun in the war's final years.) one private was the section gunner with a Bren light machine gun, and all other section members were armed with Lee–Enfield rifles. (Note: The corporal could swap his submachine gun with another member of the section, however.) At the onset of hostilities in 1939, the section consisted of the section commander, one Bren gunner and his assistant, and five riflemen for a total of eight men; in 1940, this was increased to ten men. A typical section as of 1944 was divided into a 'rifle group' consisting of the section commander and six riflemen, and a 'gun group' consisting of the section 2IC and gun controller, the section gunner or Bren No. 1, and the Bren No. 2 carrying a spare barrel for the Bren gun; the six riflemen each carried two Bren magazines and a bandolier with a further fifty rounds, the Bren No. 2 carried five magazines, and the other two members of the gun group carried four magazines for a total of a thousand rounds of ammunition for the Bren. Three sections together formed a platoon, with two being forward sections and the third being a reserve. Section tactics were designed with a view to bringing the section machine gun to bear on the enemy and providing support to it; once the gun group had suppressed the enemy ("winning the firefight"), the rifle group would assault and destroy the enemy position with the gun group providing fire until the last safe moment.

==== British Army carrier platoon section ====
A Universal Carrier platoon as of 1940 consisted of three sections, with each of these consisting of three Carriers (the first containing a sergeant and two privates, the second and third containing a corporal and two privates). Section armament, in addition to the men's personal weapons, consisted of three Bren guns (one per Carrier) and one Boys anti-tank rifle. The 1941 platoon organisation added a fourth section, and armament was modified to include grenades "if necessary" and a two-inch mortar in the second Carrier; the anti-tank rifle was standardised as being the secondary weapon of the third Carrier. The 1943 platoon organisation replaced the anti-tank rifle with a PIAT, added a fourth private to each Carrier, and also added one motorcyclist per section to serve as an orderly.

The 1941 platoon organisation also featured a motorcycle section consisting of eight standard motorcycles and four motorcycles with Bren-equipped sidecars; personnel from this section were supposed to be interchangeable with the Carrier sections. This particular section was eliminated from the 1943 organisation.

==== British Army rifle section (Cold War) ====
The 1950s initially had no meaningful changes to the infantry section and its armament save for the rifle group gaining a seventh man (for a total of eleven men per section) and the issue of Lee-Enfield-launched No. 94 anti-tank grenades, but later saw the replacement of .303in weapons with new models chambered for 7.62mm NATO, as well as a shift from the magazine-fed Bren to the belt-fed L7A1 (later L7A2) general purpose machine gun (GPMG). Most platoons reverted to an eight-man section organisation (at peacetime establishment), with the rifle group now consisting of the section commander (corporal) with an L1A1 Self-Loading Rifle (SLR) (Note: At first, the section commander continued to have a submachine gun. By June 1959, the submachine gun had been swapped out for the rifle.) and five riflemen with L1A1 SLRs, while the gun group consisted of the section gunner or Gun Group No. 1 with the Bren (later GPMG), (Note: The 7.62mm L4 versions of the Bren began to be issued in 1955; the L7A1 GPMG was adopted three years later, but several years were needed to replace the earlier weapon. Units deployed during the 1963-66 Indonesia–Malaysia confrontation were thus equipped in the main with the L4 Bren during the initial stages, and actually preferred it over the GPMG due to the latter weapon's heavier weight as well as its tendency to have its ammunition belts snag on vegetation.) and the Gun Group No. 2 with an SLR. (Note: None of the sources here cited make it clear which man, if any, was the section 2IC.) In a mechanised platoon, the section gained two men who were detailed as vehicle crewmen, but dismounted strength remained at eight men; two of these could be detailed as a Medium Anti-tank Weapon (MAW) No. 1 with an L14A1 84mm anti-tank weapon and a MAW No. 2 with additional 84mm rounds once the weapon system became available in the late 1960s but otherwise continued to act as riflemen (in other battalions, the MAW No. 1 and No 2 were normally part of the platoon headquarters). The No. 94 grenades were made compatible with the L1A1 SLR and continued to be issued for anti-armour defence in lieu of or in addition to the L14A1, with these later being replaced by shoulder-fired L1 66mm HEAT rockets. The M79 40mm grenade launcher was available, but not in large numbers.

Tactical doctrine continued to emphasise the primacy of the machine gun during a firefight, while also stating that, where casualties were sustained, a section could only be reduced to one NCO and five other ranks before bayonet power in the assault or the ability to organise a proper system of double sentries at night time were fatally compromised.

Sections operating in Northern Ireland during the Troubles were almost always equipped entirely with rifles; if machine gun capability was required, this was usually fulfilled by the L4A4 version of the Bren rather the L7 GPMG.

Later sections remained at eight men (as well as any men detailed as vehicle crew) (Note: Initially at least, the mechanised platoon section would consist of six dismounts, with the seventh and eighth dismounts being supplied by reservists in the event of mobilisation.) but saw the rifle group being modified so that, in the event of a significant armour threat, two riflemen could be re-roled as a MAW No. 1 with an L14A1 84mm anti-tank gun and either an L2A3 9mm submachine gun or an SLR and a MAW No. 2 with an SLR and additional 84mm ammunition (at other times, the rifle group would continue to rely on the L1 rockets for engaging armoured targets). The group could be split into two smaller groups for the purposes of effecting fire and manoeuvre if the gun group was unable to do so for reasons of ground, distance, or both. The gun group reverted to being commanded by the section 2IC, but remained a two-man organisation under most circumstances. One section per platoon would be nominated to use the L7 GPMG in its sustained fire role where needed, and would thus be issued with the necessary conversion stores.

==== British Army rifle section (Late and Post–Cold War) ====
The introduction of the 5.56mm select-fire SA80 series (L85 rifle or individual weapon and L86 light support weapon) to replace 7.62mm weapons and the L2A3 submachine gun from the mid-to-late 1980s onwards led to the rifle group/gun group organisation being abandoned in favour of fireteam groupings, with this being officially mentioned as early as 1977 (Note: Compared to later rifle section organisations, the 1977 fireteam organisation simply saw the transfer of two riflemen from the rifle group to the gun group.) and being given full doctrinal definition by 1986; however, sections organised according to the earlier rifle group/gun group model would still be in existence until at least 1988, with changes in such sections mostly being limited to earlier weapons being replaced by their newer equivalents. The British section continued to consist of eight soldiers, but under normal circumstances these were now divided into a "Charlie" and "Delta" fireteam (Note: These designations hold true regardless of the particular section, with alphanumeric prefixes being used to tell fireteams apart (e.g. "Foxtrot-1-3-Charlie" would be the Charlie fireteam belonging to the third section in "F" company's first platoon). "Alpha" and "Bravo" designations are used for the platoon commander and platoon sergeant respectively.) with each team comprising an NCO and three other men. The platoon continued, and continues, to be composed of three sections.

The normal section organisation from the late 1980s to the early 2000s was as follows:

- Charlie Fireteam
  - Section Commander/Charlie Commander (Corporal) armed with an L85A1 5.56mm rifle (Upgraded to L85A2 from 2002 to 2006)
  - Two Riflemen armed with L85A1 5.56mm rifles (Upgraded to L85A2 from 2002 to 2006)
  - Gunner armed with an L86A1 5.56mm light support weapon (Upgraded to L86A2 from 2002 to 2006; often replaced informally by the earlier L7A2 7.62mm general purpose machine gun owing to the L86's shortcomings in the section machine gun role, and later officially replaced by the L110A1/A2 5.56mm light machine gun)
- Delta Fireteam
  - Section 2IC/Delta Commander (Lance Corporal) armed with an L85A1 5.56mm rifle (Upgraded to L85A2 from 2002 to 2006)
  - Two Riflemen armed with L85A1 5.56mm rifles (Upgraded to L85A2 from 2002 to 2006)
  - Gunner armed with an L86A1 5.56mm light support weapon (Upgraded to L86A2 from 2002 to 2006; often replaced informally by the earlier L7A2 7.62mm general purpose machine gun owing to the L86's shortcomings in the section machine gun role, and later officially replaced by the L110A1/A2 5.56mm light machine gun)

This grouping provided a balanced organisation, with either fireteam being capable of moving to assault or supporting the other fireteam's movement (though doctrine still had the Lance Corporal's fireteam providing covering fire in the initial stages of a section attack). The fireteam concept was intended to introduce an element of flexibility, and consequently two other section groupings were devised; an assault team/support team grouping where the Delta fireteam (consisting of the section 2IC, a rifleman, and both section gunners) was responsible for covering the Charlie fireteam (consisting of the section commander and three riflemen, though this could be raised to four if the rifleman in the Delta fireteam was moved to the Charlie fireteam) during the latter's movement from one position to another, and a modified version of the earlier rifle group/gun group organisation, used if it was felt that the strongest possible manoeuvre force was required, where both section gunners formed the gun group and all remaining personnel formed the Charlie fireteam which acted as the rifle group. There were also groupings devised in relation to specific combat scenarios; sections engaged in trench clearing could either be organised as usual or be split into four assault teams of two men each, while sections tasked with clearing a house were organised into a command group, a covering group comprising both section gunners (and possibly the section 2IC), and two assault groups of two riflemen each. Fireteams could also be split into smaller sub-divisions of two men each outside of these groupings, particularly during fire and manoeuvre.

Two LAW 80 launchers (designated as the L1A1 94mm HEAT rocket system and henceforth referred to as LAWs) were part of the standard equipment allocation for each section, replacing the L14A1 gun and the L1A3 66mm rockets, and were carried as needed; the normal section grouping had one LAW per fireteam, while the assault team/support team grouping could have a LAW carried by one or both teams depending on the perceived armour threat. It was also possible to have the platoon's reserve section equipped with all six LAWs, leaving the two forward sections unencumbered for fire and manoeuvre and providing them with anti-armour defence. The earlier M79 grenade launcher continued to be available as late as the autumn of 1995, but grenade launcher capability was mostly provided by the rifle-launched L74A1 HEAT and L75A1 HEAT-APERS grenades; the L85A1 HE rifle grenade began to replace these in April 1998. Issue was scaled at twelve rifle grenades and six L15A1 rifle grenade launcher sights per section, effectively allowing all rifle-equipped members of the section to carry and use two rifle grenades each.

Sections mounted aboard the FV510 Warrior infantry fighting vehicle consisted of seven men, with one fireteam's second rifleman usually being the section member that was omitted. Sections mounted aboard the earlier FV432 armoured personnel carrier remained at eight men.

==== British Army rifle section (Global War on Terror and later) ====
Changes were made to the section's equipment during the 2000s in response to operational demands and experience; the L85A1 rifle was upgraded to L85A2 standard between 2002 and 2006, with a further upgrade package consisting of a Picatinny rail handguard and alternative optical sights being introduced for select units in 2007 and more generally from 2009 onwards, the L123 40mm underslung grenade launcher (UGL) was introduced as a replacement for rifle-launched grenades, the L86 light support weapon was replaced as the section machine gun by the L110A1-A3 5.56mm light machine gun acquired as an Urgent Operational Requirement, and the second rifleman in the fireteam was re-roled as a designated marksman carrying either the L86A2 light support weapon or, in later years, the L129A1 7.62mm sharpshooter rifle. By 2005 therefore, the normal section grouping was reorganised as follows:

- Charlie Fireteam
  - Section Commander/Charlie Commander (Corporal) armed with an L85A2 5.56mm rifle
  - Rifleman armed with an L85A2 5.56mm rifle and L123A1-A3 40mm UGL (though this could be carried by the fireteam commander instead)
  - Gunner armed with an L110A2/A3 5.56mm light machine gun
  - Designated marksman armed with an L86A2 5.56mm light support weapon (Supplemented and then largely replaced by L129A1 7.62mm sharpshooter rifle from 2010 onwards)
- Delta Fireteam
  - Section 2IC/Delta Commander (Lance Corporal) armed with an L85A2 5.56mm rifle
  - Rifleman armed with an L85A2 5.56mm rifle and L123A1-A3 40mm UGL (though this could be carried by the fireteam commander instead)
  - Gunner armed with an L110A2/A3 5.56mm light machine gun
  - Designated marksman armed with an L86A2 5.56mm light support weapon (Supplemented and then largely replaced by L129A1 7.62mm sharpshooter rifle from 2010 onwards)

The two other section groupings were also modified; initially, the assault team/support team grouping had the Charlie fireteam consist of the section commander, one marksman, and two riflemen, and the Delta fireteam consist of the section 2IC, the second marksman, and both section gunners. The rifle group/gun group organisation saw no meaningful changes other than the general fact of two riflemen having been replaced by designated marksmen. In 2009, more drastic changes were implemented where the assault team/support team grouping now had the Charlie fireteam consist of the section commander, a rifleman with UGL, and both section gunners, with the Delta fireteam consisting of the section 2IC, both section marksmen, and a rifleman with UGL. The rifle group/gun group organisation was replaced by a fast assault/fire support grouping where the Charlie fireteam consisted of the section commander with UGL and a rifleman, while all remaining personnel formed the Delta fireteam. Trench clearing and house clearing groupings remained unchanged. Some units operating in Afghanistan carried on using the L7A2 GPMG as the section machine gun or included it as an additional weapon on the scale of one per fireteam; in the case of the latter, this meant that only two L85A2s (at least one of which was fitted with the UGL) were carried per section. The 84mm AT-4 (L1A2 or L2A1) and then the 150mm NLAW replaced the L1A1 94mm HEAT rocket as the section anti-armour weapon, though carrying arrangements were essentially unchanged; the Javelin can also be carried for anti-armour capability. The L128A1 12 bore combat shotgun was introduced for use by the section point man, with this position subject to rotation within the section to avoid excessive stress for individual soldiers.

The 2011 revision of Fieldcraft, Battle Lessons and Exercises prescribed yet another assault team/support team grouping where the Charlie fireteam consisted of the section commander, two riflemen (one with UGL), and both section marksmen while the Delta fireteam consisted of the section 2IC with UGL and both section gunners.

The L85A2 began being upgraded to L85A3 standard from 2018 onwards, while the L86A2 and L110A3 began to be removed from service in 2019, leaving the L129A1 and L7A2 as the standard section designated marksman rifle and standard section machine gun respectively. With section commanders now also being able to tailor equipment formations as needed instead of having to deploy in a pre-set lineup, the current British infantry section is as follows:

- Section Commander/Charlie Fireteam Commander (Corporal) armed with an L85A2/A3 5.56 mm rifle
- Section 2IC/Delta Fireteam Commander (Lance Corporal) armed with an L85A2/A3 5.56 mm rifle
- Four Riflemen (Privates) armed with L85A2/A3 5.56 mm rifles, two of which will normally be equipped with an L123A3 40 mm UGL.
- Gunner (Private) armed with an L7A2 7.62 mm general purpose machine gun (at the section commander's discretion, the gunner can be re-designated as an additional rifleman with an L85A2/A3 5.56 mm rifle)
- Designated marksman (Private) armed with an L129A1 7.62 mm sharpshooter rifle

==== British Army mortar section ====
Second World War-era mortar platoons did not have sections as such, with the platoons instead consisting of two or more "detachment" subunits which each had a sergeant as detachment commander, a corporal as 2iC, one private as detachment orderly, and four more privates as "mortar numbers" attending to the ML 3-inch mortar. A modern mortar platoon's subunits are referred to as sections, with these sections consisting of a command post and three detachments of three men and a L16A2 81mm mortar each.

==== British Army sniper section ====
When the sniper section was a standalone organisation within the infantry battalion, the strength of said section varied; a 1950s sniper section consisted of a sergeant, a corporal, two lance corporals, and four privates, with the battalion's scale of sniping equipment being enough for these to form four separate sniper-spotter pairs (both with sniper rifles, though the spotter could take a submachine gun instead). The 1963 battalion organisation did not have a formal sniper section, but did have a requirement for six privates to be selected from across the rifle companies so that they could be trained by the headquarters company's sniper and weapon training instructor. Following the reintroduction of snipers to the Army in 1968, a late 1970s infantry battalion had enough equipment to form six pairs with an L42A1 rifle and a optical sight-equipped L1A1 SLR each, but without said pairs being a permanent part of the battalion's establishment. By 1980, the equipment allocation had been increased to allow the fielding of eight pairs. An "ideal" establishment as of 1996 consisted of sixteen sniper-trained personnel, of no fixed rank, that were divided into eight pairs. The 1950s section was centralised within battalion headquarters, albeit with the option to spread out the pairs among the rifle companies, while the 1976 section's pairs could either be centralised within the battalion or be allocated to rifle companies, the support company's reconnaissance platoon, or both. (Note: Suggested deployment as of 1980 was two pairs per rifle company.) The latter arrangement was still in effect as of 1996, but the relevant pamphlet advised that the section would operate most effectively if attached wholesale to the reconnaissance platoon and went so far as to suggest that personnel from said platoon man the sniper section on a dual role basis. By 2011, the standalone section had been replaced with a platoon organisation consisting of two sections and a headquarters element (the total manning of this platoon still coming to sixteen sniper-trained personnel per battalion), with each of the two sections consisting of three sniper pairs; two pairs consist of a private (sniper) and a lance corporal (spotter and pair commander), while the third pair consists of a private (sniper) and corporal (spotter and section commander). The sniper has a long range rifle (currently the L115A3/A4) (Note: As of 2011, the sniper is also supposed to carry a standard-issue rifle for close-in defence.) while the spotter has either a standard-issue rifle, a weapon offering longer range than the standard-issue rifle, (Note: The Sniper Support Weapon version of the L129A1 is currently the primary weapon of the spotter; the L86 LSW was used prior to this, and still saw some limited use while in Army service.) or a second sniper rifle, as well as a pair of binoculars and a spotting scope for target indication; both sniper pair members also have access to pistols and grenades.

==== Royal Marines ====
Royal Marine sections have generally, but not always, (Note: One notable difference in organisation was the decision to issue L4A4 light machine guns to sections operating in Arctic conditions on account of their higher reliability in such climes compared to the L7 GPMG; then, during the Falklands War, a simultaneous issue of both weapons was effected in order to have two machine guns (i.e. one L7 GPMG and one L4 LMG) per section. The Army's Parachute Regiment also perceived a need for additional machine guns during the conflict, but merely issued one additional L7 GPMG per section.) been organised similarly to those of the British Army. Under the Future Commando Force programme, however, trials have been held of four-man and twelve-man rifle sections.

==== Royal Air Force Regiment ====
The Royal Air Force Regiment, the ground-based component of the Royal Air Force, has also employed section organisations that are similar to those of the British Army.

==== Cadet Forces rifle section ====
The Army Cadet Force, the Royal Marines Cadets, and the Army and Royal Marine Sections of the Combined Cadet Force also make use of rifle sections; these are equipped similarly to their Armed Forces counterparts, albeit with a different small arms selection (Note: The Lee-Enfield No. 4 rifle and Bren light machine gun were not replaced with 7.62mm weapons like they were in the Armed Forces; when the Armed Forces then adopted the select-fire L85, the Cadet Forces were instead issued with the straight-pull L98A1. While the self-loading L98A2 version that has been issued since 2009 is closer in appearance and function to the L85, it is still restricted to producing one shot per trigger pull.) and with explosives limited to smoke grenades, thunderflashes (currently known as "battle simulators"), and hand-fired rocket flares. The following section groupings were used until 2018:

- Normal section grouping (Until 1990)
  - Rifle group
    - Section Commander (Corporal) armed with a No. 4 .303 rifle (Partially and then completely substituted by the L98A1 5.56mm cadet GP rifle in the late 1980s and the 1990s)
    - Five Riflemen armed with No. 4 .303 rifles (Partially and then completely substituted by L98A1 5.56mm cadet GP rifles in the late 1980s and the 1990s)
  - Gun group
    - Section 2IC (Lance Corporal) armed with a No. 4 .303 rifle (Partially and then completely substituted by the L98A1 5.56mm cadet GP rifle in the late 1980s and the 1990s)
    - Gunner armed with a Bren .303 light machine gun (Partially and then completely substituted by the L86A1 5.56mm light support weapon in the late 1980s and the 1990s)
- Normal section grouping (1990 onwards)
  - Charlie Fireteam
    - Section Commander/Charlie Commander (Corporal) armed with an L98A1/A2 5.56mm cadet GP rifle
    - Two Riflemen armed with L98A1/A2 5.56mm cadet GP rifles
    - Gunner armed with an L86A1/A2 5.56mm light support weapon
  - Delta Fireteam
    - Section 2IC/Delta Commander (Lance Corporal) armed with an L98A1/A2 5.56mm cadet GP rifle
    - Two Riflemen armed with L98A1/A2 5.56mm cadet GP rifles
    - Gunner armed with an L86A1/A2 5.56mm light support weapon
- Assault team/Support team grouping (2013 onwards)
  - Charlie Fireteam (Assault team)
    - Section Commander/Charlie Commander (Corporal) armed with an L98A2 5.56mm cadet GP rifle
    - Three Riflemen armed with L98A2 5.56mm cadet GP rifles
  - Delta Fireteam (Support team)
    - Section 2IC/Delta Commander (Lance Corporal) armed with an L98A2 5.56mm cadet GP rifle
    - Two Gunners armed with L86A2 5.56mm light support weapons
    - Rifleman armed with an L98A2 5.56mm cadet GP rifle
- Fast assault/Fire support grouping (2013 onwards)
  - Charlie Fireteam (Fast assault)
    - Section Commander/Charlie Commander (Corporal) armed with an L98A2 5.56mm cadet GP rifle
    - Rifleman armed with an L98A2 5.56mm cadet GP rifle
  - Delta Fireteam (Fire support)
    - Section 2IC/Delta Commander (Lance Corporal) armed with an L98A2 5.56mm cadet GP rifle
    - Three Riflemen armed with L98A2 5.56mm cadet GP rifles
    - Two Gunners armed with L86A2 5.56mm light support weapons

Cadet Force L86s were commandeered by the Armed Forces for use in Operation Herrick and Operation Telic; while temporary, this would cause the Cadet Forces to have few if any L86s until at least 2009. (Note: While outside the scope of this section, some units of the Air Training Corps were only able to resume L86 training and shooting in the early 2010s.) The L86s then began to be withdrawn from service at the same time as those held by the Armed Forces, with no direct replacement for the weapon being identified; as such, a Cadet Force section currently consists solely of riflemen armed with L98A2s.

=== Canadian Army ===
The Canadian Army also uses the section, which is roughly the same as its British counterpart, except that it is led by a sergeant, with a master corporal as the 2IC. The section is further divided into two assault groups of four soldiers each (equivalent to the Australian and British fireteams) and a vehicle group consisting of a driver and a gunner. Assault groups are broken down to even smaller 'fireteams' consisting of two soldiers, designated Alpha, Bravo, Charlie and Delta. Alpha and Bravo make up Assault Group 1; Charlie and Delta make up Assault Group 2. The section commander will have overall control of the section, and is assigned to Fireteam Alpha of Assault Group 1. The 2IC will be in command of Assault Group 2, and is assigned to Fireteam Charlie.

Groupings are as follows:

- Assault Group 1
  - Fireteam Alpha
    - Section Commander armed with a C7 rifle/C8 carbine.
    - LMG Gunner armed with a C9 light machine gun.
  - Fireteam Bravo
    - Rifleman armed with a C7 rifle.
    - Grenadier armed with a C7 rifle and an underslung M203 grenade launcher.
- Assault Group 2
  - Fireteam Charlie
    - Section 2IC armed with a C7 rifle/C8 carbine.
    - LMG Gunner armed with a C9 light machine gun.
  - Fireteam Delta
    - Rifleman armed with a C7 rifle.
    - Grenadier armed with a C7 rifle and an underslung M203 grenade launcher.
- Vehicle Group
  - Driver armed with a C8 carbine.
  - Vehicle Gunner armed with a C8 carbine.

In a mechanised section, the vehicle group gains a commander and stays with the section vehicle (Currently the LAV VI), while the second assault group loses its rifleman

=== Danish Army ===
In the Danish Army, a section is a smaller military unit, which within the infantry consists of individual groups of approximately 16 men, or which denotes a reduced platoon. The unit is normally led by a Oversergent (OR-7) or Sergeant (OR-5), who is called a section leader, and who is often also a group leader for one of the section's groups. There is typically a sergeant as second-in-command; this acts as a group leader for the other of the two groups that the section usually consists of.

Sections are usually highly specialized support units providing heavy weapons support, EOD support etc.

=== Finnish Army ===
A Finnish infantry section or ryhmä consists of one section commander or ryhmänjohtaja, one section 2IC or ryhmänvarajohtaja, and 6-8 other soldiers. Depending on the number of servicemen in a section, different combat formation models may be used. А "half-section" (puoliryhmä) model for 7 servicemen in a section is as follows:

- First half-section
  - Section Commander armed with a 7.62 RK 62 series rifle.
  - First fire-and-manoeuvre team (Taistelijapari)
    - Machine gunner armed with a 7.62 KK PKM general purpose machine gun.
    - Rifleman armed with a 7.62 RK 62 series rifle.
- Second half-section
  - Second fire-and-manoeuvre team
    - Two riflemen armed with 7.62 RK 62 series rifles and 66 KES anti-tank weapons
  - Third fire-and-manoeuvre team
    - Rifleman armed with a 7.62 RK 62 series rifle.
    - Section 2IC armed with a 7.62 RK 62 series rifle.
    - Driver armed with a 7.62 RK 62 series rifle.

For the 8-person model the section commander and driver can be on the same fire-and-manoeuvre team or driver is a member of the third fire-and-manoeuvre team.

A section consisting of 9 military personnel can be divided into three equally sized fireteams, with organisation being as follows:

- Section commander's fireteam (Ryhmänjohtajan partio)
  - Fireteam leader (Section Commander) armed with a 7.62 RK 62 series rifle.
  - Combat lifesaver armed with a 7.62 RK 62 series rifle.
  - Designated marksman armed with a 7.62 RK 62 series rifle with enhanced optics.
- Point fireteam (Kärkipartio)
  - Fireteam leader (Section 2IC) armed with a 7.62 RK 62 series rifle.
  - Machine gunner armed with a 7.62 KK PKM general purpose machine gun.
  - Rifleman armed with a 7.62 RK 62 series rifle and a 66 KES anti-tank weapon
- Support fireteam (Tukipartio)
  - Fireteam leader (To be appointed by the section commander) armed with a 7.62 RK 62 series rifle.
  - Machine gunner armed with a 7.62 KK PKM general purpose machine gun.
  - Engineer armed with a 7.62 RK 62 series rifle.

=== French Army ===
In the French Army, the word section describes an organization equivalent to an English-language platoon and is a subunit of a company, in most military contexts. (In cavalry or armoured units, a subunit of a company is a peloton [platoon].)

The equivalent organization to a NATO section is a groupe de combat ("combat group"), which is divided into:

- a "300 metre fireteam" armed with HK 416 5.56 mm assault rifles and carrying an AT4 anti-tank weapon and
- a "600 metre fireteam", armed with a FN Minimi, a HK 416 and a personal grenade launcher.

=== Irish Army ===
In the Irish Army, the infantry platoon's section as of 2020 consists of one Corporal or Ceannaire as section commander and eight other ranks. Section armament consists of eight Steyr AUG A1 rifles (including versions reconfigured to Mod 14 standard with a Picatinny rail and an ACOG 4x magnification optical sight), with two of these being equipped with an M203 grenade launcher, and one FN MAG 58 general purpose machine gun; two soldiers are additionally armed with AT4 short range anti-armour weapons (SRAAW) for anti-armour defence, while Heckler & Koch USP pistols are available for distribution at the platoon level. Three sections together with a headquarters element form a platoon.

=== Singapore Army ===
Singapore Army's infantry section consists of seven men led by a Third Sergeant and assisted by a Corporal or Corporal First Class as 2IC. Each section is divided into one 3-man group – including the section commander, and two 2-man groups. Weapons carried by each section include two light anti-tank weapons, two section automatic weapons (SAW), and two M203 grenade launchers.

=== South African Army ===
In the South African Army Infantry Formation (which is responsible for all South African Army infantry), the standard infantry section is divided into a seven-man rifle group and a three-man machine gun group as per the earlier British model; the rifle group consists of a section commander (Corporal) and six riflemen, all armed with R4 5.56mm rifles, while the gun group consists of a section 2IC (Lance Corporal) with a R4 5.56mm rifle, a Machine Gun No. 1 with an FN MAG 7.62mm general purpose machine gun, SS-77 7.62mm general purpose machine gun, or Mini-SS 5.56mm light machine gun, and a Machine Gun No. 2 with a R4 5.56mm rifle. In a mechanised infantry section, the rifle group is reduced to five men for a total of eight men in the section.

=== Spanish Army ===
The Spanish Army is made up of the following sub-subunits:

- Squad (Spanish: Escuadra), сonsisting a corporal and 2–4 soldiers
- Section (Spanish: Pelotón), (Note: based on the fact that in publications of the Military Review journal the terms Squad/Team is translated into Spanish as Escuadra/Equipo) сonsisting of two squads and commanded by a corporal or sergeant.

Escuadra formations can be divided according to the weapon they use into:

- Rifle squad: Made up of a corporal and 3–4 soldiers. Their weapon is the combat rifle.
- Machine gun squad: Made up of a corporal, who carries a machine gun, and 2–3 soldiers. Their personal weapon is the combat rifle, except for the machine gun corporal, who carries a pistol.
- Mortar squad: There are 2–3 soldiers who carry grenades for the mortar. Their weapons are rifles, except for the corporal, who carries a submachine gun.
- Grenade launcher squad: A corporal carries the grenade launcher (a bazooka-type tube), and 2–3 soldiers carry the grenades. Their weapons are rifles, except for the corporal, who carries a submachine gun.

Pelotón formations can be divided into:

- Rifle section: Consisting of two rifle squads or one rifle squad and one machine gun squad.
- Mixed section: Consisting of one rifle squad and one mortar or grenade launcher squad.
- Mortar section: A unit consisting of a corporal, 1–2 corporals, and 5–8 soldiers.
- Missile section: A special section armed with a missile launcher.
- RCL section: A special section armed with a M40 recoilless rifle. Consisting of a first corporal, unit leader, a corporal or private driver, a corporal shooter, and 4–6 support soldiers. All carry submachine guns.

=== United States Army ===
Historically, a section of US Infantry was a "half platoon" (the platoon itself being a "half company"). The section was led by a sergeant assisted by one or (later) two corporals and consisted of a total of from 12 to 50 soldiers, depending on the time period. The section is used as an administrative formation and may be bigger than the regular squad formation often overseen by a Staff Sergeant. The modern examples of a section as half a platoon are:

- a tank platoon includes four main battle tanks organized into two sections (A, B), with two tanks in each section
- the mechanized Infantry platoon is equipped with four BFVs and is divided into two vehicle sections (A, B) as mounted element with three Infantry squads as dismounted element
- the Armored brigade combat team (ABCT) scout platoon, the Stryker brigade combat team (SBCT) Cavalry squadron scout platoon and the Infantry brigade combat team (IBCT) mounted scout platoon have 6 vehicles, which can be divided into 2 sections (A, B) of 3 vehicles or 3 sections (A, B, HQ) of 2 vehicles
- the Infantry weapons company has a company headquarters and four assault platoons; each assault platoon has two sections of two squads and a leader's vehicle; each squad contains four Soldiers and a vehicle mounting the heavy weapons

Since the Stryker Infantry rifle platoon consists of four Stryker Infantry carrier vehicles (known as ICVs), it can also be divided into two sections (A, B) with two ICVs in each section. The Stryker Infantry rifle platoons can fight in multiple mutually supporting maneuver elements, such as the squad leader controls up to two Infantry fire teams and a machine gun team, while a section leader commands two ICVs and an Infantry fire team.

Examples when a section is one of the sub-subunits of a company or platoon:

- the Infantry rifle company has three Infantry rifle platoons, a mortar section, and a headquarters section; the mortar section has two squads, each with a 60-mm mortar
- the headquarters and headquarters company of the Infantry battalion consists the battalion command section, battalion staff sections, the company headquarters, the battalion's medical, mortar, and scout platoons, signal and retransmission sections, and sniper squad; the battalion command section consists of the battalion commander, the battalion executive officer (XO), and the battalion command sergeant major
- the medical platoon of the Infantry battalion is configured with a headquarters element, medical treatment squad, ambulance squad (ground), and combat medic section

Examples of combat medic section depending on the type of medical platoon:

| Type of medical platoon | Number of servicemen in the combat medic section | |
| Type of medical platoon | Emergency care sergeants | Combat medics |
|---|---|---|
| Combined arms battalion (armored) medical platoon | 1 | 6 |
| Combined arms battalion (infantry) medical platoon | 2 | 7 |
| Stryker battalion medical platoon | 3 | 11 |
| Infantry battalion medical platoon | 3 | 12 |

=== United States Marine Corps ===
The USMC employs sections as intermediate tactical echelons in infantry, armored vehicle units (individual vehicles being the base tactical element), and low altitude air defense (LAAD) units, and as the base tactical element in artillery units. Infantry sections can consist of as few as eight Marines (heavy machinegun section) to as many as 32 in an 81-mm mortar section. In headquarters, service, and support units throughout the USMC (CE, GCE, ACE, and LCE), sections are used as functional sub-units of headquarters or platoons. For example, the intelligence section (S-2) of a battalion or squadron headquarters; the communications-electronics maintenance section, communication platoon, regimental headquarters company; armory section, Marine aviation logistics squadron. In Marine aircraft squadrons, section is also used to designate a flight of two or three aircraft under the command of a designated section leader. Some sections, such as weapons platoon sections are led by a staff non-commissioned Officer (SNCO), usually a staff sergeant. Tank and other armored vehicle sections, as well as service and support sections, may be led by either an officer, usually a lieutenant (or a CWO, in the case of service and support units), or a SNCO ranging from staff sergeant to master sergeant. Headquarters and aircraft sections are always led by a commissioned officer. Rifle squads generally contain 13 marines.

In infantry units, weapons platoons have sections consisting of the squads and teams that man the crew-served weapons.

Weapons platoon, rifle company:

- a machine gun section, consisting of a section leader and three machine gun squads, each containing two machine gun teams of three men each
- an LWCMS mortar section, consisting of a section leader and three 60mm mortar squads, each containing one mortar and four man crew
- an assault section, consisting of a section leader and three assault squads, each containing two assault teams of two men each

Weapons company, infantry battalion:

- an 81mm mortar platoon, consisting of a five-man platoon headquarters and two 81mm mortar sections, each section containing four 81mm mortar squads of six men each and an eight-man section headquarters.
- an antiarmor platoon, consisting of a three-man platoon headquarters and a Javelin section, containing a section leader and two Javelin squads, each having two teams of two men each, and an antitank (TOW) section, containing a section leader and four antitank squads, each having a squad leader and two TOW teams of two men each
- a heavy machine gun (HMG) platoon, consisting of a four-man platoon headquarters and three HMG sections, each having two HMG squads of four men each.

In armored vehicle units, platoons consist of sections consisting of individual vehicles and their crews:

- light armored reconnaissance platoon consist of two sections, each containing two light armored vehicles and crews
- assault amphibian vehicle (AAV) platoons consist of three sections, each section is generally organized with four AAVP7A1 vehicles and possesses the assets to mechanize one infantry platoon (or similar size supported unit)
- combat engineer assault breacher sections consist of two CEV assault breacher vehicles and crews

Before all USMC tank units were disbanded in 2021, a tank platoon was completely analogous to an army one and consisted of two sections of two tanks each.

In low altitude air defense (LAAD) batteries, the firing platoons consist of three sections, each consisting of a section leader and five two-man Stinger missile teams.

One Marine artillery firing battery will normally support one infantry battalion. The artillery firing battery consists of two platoons – the headquarters platoon and the firing platoon. The headquarters platoon consists of an FDC section, ammunition section, communications section, motor transport section, and liaison section. The firing platoon consists of a platoon headquarters section and six howitzer sections. A howitzer section consists of a section chief and nine cannoneers.

== Air forces ==
In some air forces, a section is a unit containing three to four aircraft (if it is a flying unit) and up to 20 personnel. Two or three sections usually make up a flight.

The United States Air Force uses the term element, as well as section, to designate two or three subunits within a flight.

In the context of British Empire military aviation during World War I, the term half flight or half-flight was used for equivalent formations; at the time a flight was normally four to six aircraft. Hence the Mesopotamian Half Flight, the first Australian flying unit to see action, initially comprised three aircraft. After the war, the Royal Air Force and other Commonwealth air forces adopted the term section for a formation of three aircraft, while a flight was normally six aircraft.

During the Second World War:

- in the German Luftwaffe, the equivalent in fighter units was a Schwarm of four aircraft and, in bomber units, a Kette (three aircraft), along with headquarters and support personnel, and;
- the Soviet Red Air Force the equivalent was a zveno (three or four aircraft).

== Space forces ==
The United States Space Force has the following structure of military units:

- two or more guardians form a section; this is also referred to as an “element” in basic training
- a flight comprises Individual guardians or sections
- two or more flights form a squadron (commanded by major or lieutenant colonel) — the lowest level of command, usually identified by number and function
- two or more squadrons form a delta (commanded by colonel)

== See also ==
- Individual movement techniques
- Contubernium (Roman army unit)

== Bibliography ==
- ADP 3-90, Offense and Defense (PDF). Washington, DC: Department of the Army. 31 July 2019.
- APP-06, NATO Joint Military Symbology (Ed. E, Ver. 1). Brussels, Belgium: NATO Standardization Office. 11 October 2023.
- ATP 3-09.50, The Field Artillery Cannon Battery (PDF). Washington, DC: Department of the Army. 4 May 2016.
- ATP 3-20.15 / MCRP 3-10B.1, Tank Platoon (PDF). Washington, DC / Quantico, VA: Department of the Army / Marine Corps Combat Development Command. 3 July 2019.
- ATP 3-20.98, Scout Platoon (PDF). Washington, DC: Department of the Army. 4 December 2019.
- ATP 3-21.11, Stryker Brigade Combat Team Infantry Rifle Company (PDF). Washington, DC: Department of the Army. 25 November 2020.
- ATP 3-21.20, Infantry Battalion (PDF). Washington, DC: Department of the Army. 28 December 2017.
- ATP 3-21.71, Mechanized Infantry Platoon and Squad (PDF). Washington, DC: Department of the Army. 15 October 2024.
- ATP 4-02.4, Medical Platoon (PDF). Washington, DC: Department of the Army. 12 May 2021.
- B-GL-309-003/FT-001, The Infantry Section and Platoon in Battle. Canada: Department of National Defence. 1996.
- FM 1-02.2, Military Symbols (PDF). Washington, DC: Department of the Army. 23 January 2025.
- LWD 3-3-7, Employment of Infantry (PDF). Australian Army. 12 December 2008. Archived from the original (PDF) on 2019-04-11.
- MCIP 3-10A.3i, Marine Infantry Platoon (PDF). Washington, DC: Headquarters Marine Corps. 10 June 2019.
- MCTP 3-10C, Employment of Amphibious Assault Vehicles (PDF). United States Marine Corps. 31 July 2020.
- Codesal Fidalgo, Francisco José (2014). "Organización de las fuerzas armadas españolas". Cuadernos del Tomás (in Spanish). 6: 49–70. ISSN 1889-5328.
- Sattler, V.; O’Leary, M. (2010). "Organizing Modern Infantry: An Analysis of Section Fighting Power" (PDF). Canadian Army Journal. 13.3: 23–52. ISSN 1713-773X.
