= Second-in-command =

Second-highest authority within a certain organisation

Second-in-command (2i/c or 2IC) is a title denoting that the holder of the title is the second-highest authority within a certain organisation.

== Usage ==
In the British Army or Royal Marines, the second-in-command is the deputy commander of a unit, from battalion or regiment downwards. This terminology is also used in many other Commonwealth armies and other nations. The equivalent appointment in the United States Army is the executive officer.

The second-in-command of a battalion or regiment is usually a major. The second-in-command of a company, squadron, or artillery battery (in which they are called the battery captain) is usually a captain (although infantry company second-in-commands were usually lieutenants until after the Second World War), the second-in-command of a platoon or troop is the platoon or troop sergeant, and the second-in-command of a section is usually a lance corporal.

In the Royal Navy and Commonwealth navies, the second-in-command of a vessel, regardless of rank, is known as the first lieutenant or executive officer.

== Other uses ==
In common usage, the term refers to a deputy. Its basic meaning is "someone who relieves a commander".
