= Crew =

Team of people with a common goal

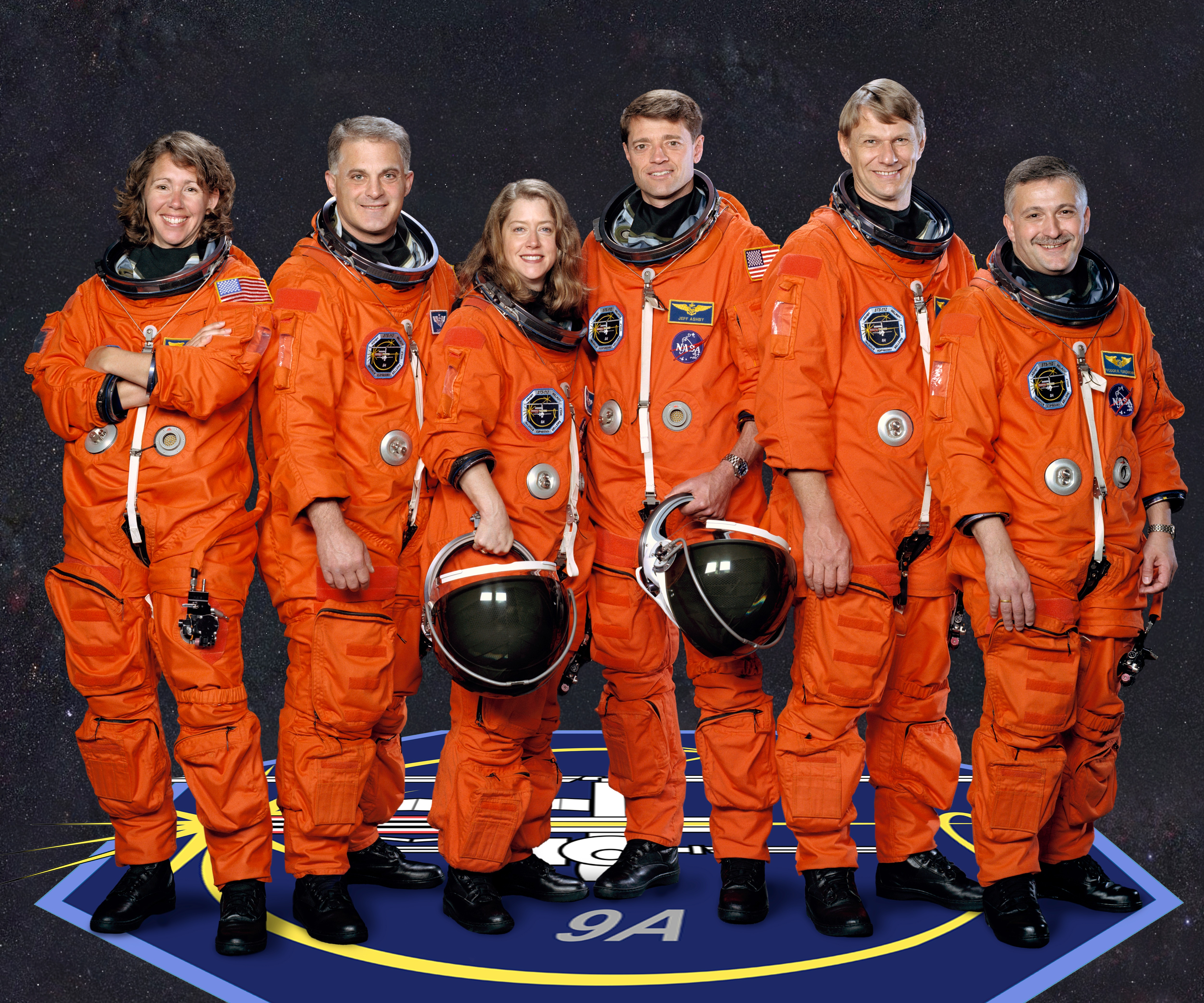
Crew of a spacecraft (Space Shuttle Atlantis, STS-112, 2002)

A crew is a body or a group of people who work at a common activity, generally in a structured or hierarchical organization. A location in which a crew works is called a crewyard or a workyard. The word has nautical resonances: the tasks involved in operating a ship, particularly a sailing ship, providing numerous specialities within a ship's crew, often organised with a chain of command. Traditional nautical usage strongly distinguishes officers from crew, though the two groups combined form the ship's company. Members of a crew are often referred to by the titles crewmate, crewman or crew-member.

== Types ==
- For a specific sporting usage, see rowing crew.
- For filmmaking usage, see film crew.
- For live music usage, see road crew.
- For analogous entities in research on human judgment and decision-making, see team and judge–advisor system.
- For stagecraft usage, see stage crew.
- For video production usage, see television crew.
- For crews in aviation and the airline industry, see groundcrew and aircrew.
- For crews in human spaceflight, see astronaut.
- Tank crew
- Boat crew
- Rail crew
- Pit crew
