= Base of fire =

Military term

In military terminology, a base of fire is a supporting force that provides overwatch and covering fire to other advancing friendly units during fire and maneuver tactics. A base of fire can be established by gunships or fire support bases during large-scale combined arms operations; by a heavy weapons platoon in company-level fire and movement; by individual armoured fighting vehicles (esp. tanks and infantry fighting vehicles) or infantry sections in platoon-level fire and movement; or by fireteams or even individual soldiers in squad-level assaults.

== See also ==
- Bounding overwatch
- Center Peel
- Fireteam
- Overwatch (military tactic)
