= List of black flags =

Flag often used as a symbol of resistance or anarchism

This is a list of flags which are entirely or largely black.

== In history ==
Solid black flag; flag of the Emirate of Afghanistan from 1880 to 1901.

Flag of the Fascist National Party (Partito Nazionale Fascista) from 1926 to 1943. There were variations of the flag with different styles of fasces, this image shows one of those styles.

Flag of the Schutzstaffel from 1925 to 1945.

- The Black Banner or Black Standard used by Abu Muslim in his uprising leading to the Abbasid Revolution in 747.
- During the German Peasants' War in the 16th century, the white, black and pink flag was used by the revolting farmers.
- Afghanistan flew a solid black flag from 1709 to 1738 and from 1880 to 1901 (see Flag of Afghanistan).
- The black flag with the motto Viurem lliures o morirem (We live free or we will die) was flown by Catalan army and militia corps during the final stages of the War of the Spanish Succession, when the Allies had already abandoned Catalonia that fought alone against the Spanish and French armies during 1713–1714. This black flag was packaged in 2012 with the historical novel Lliures o Morts (Free or Dead) authored by Jaume Clotet and David de Montserrat.
- The Anarchist black flag has been an anarchist symbol since the 1880s. Anarchists use either a plain black flag or a black flag with an "A" and an "O" around it, this symbol is a reference to a Proudhon quote "Anarchy is Order Without Power". Since the Spanish Revolution of 1936, the diagonal red-and-black flag became more widely used.
- The color black was famous as the flag of Italy's National Fascist Party, designed after the party's paramilitary Blackshirts. The Blackshirts had chosen this color to recall the Arditi, the elite Italian special forces of World War I, whose flag featured a skull with a dagger in its teeth against a black field.
- Schutzstaffel used black flag with double sig runes.
- Upon the surrender of Nazi Germany in World War II German U-boats were ordered to fly a black flag and sail to an Allied port and surrender.

The traditional "Jolly Roger" of piracy.

Flag of the Ahmadiyya Muslim Community, first designed in the 1930s. For Ahmadi Muslims, it symbolizes the advent of the Mahdi.

Chetnik flag inscription reads: "For king and fatherland; freedom or death".

- The Jolly Roger, or skull and crossbones, is flown to identify a ship's crew as pirates about to attack. The flag most commonly identified as the Jolly Roger today is the skull and crossbones (although swords are also common), a flag consisting of a human skull above two long bones (probably tibias) set in an x-mark arrangement, most usually depicted crossing each other directly under the skull, on a black field. This design was used by several pirates, including Captains Samuel Bellamy, Edward England, and John Taylor. Some Jolly Roger flags also include an hourglass, another common symbol representing death in 17th- and 18th-century Europe. Despite the prominence of flags with art in popular culture, plain black flags with no art were often employed by most pirates in the 17th–18th century. Historically, the flag was flown to frighten the pirates' victims into surrendering without a fight, since it conveyed the message that the attackers were outlaws who would not consider themselves bound by the usual rules of engagement—and might, therefore, slaughter those they defeated (since captured pirates were usually hanged, they did not have much to gain by asking quarter if defeated). Since the decline of piracy, various military units have used the Jolly Roger, usually in skull-and-crossbones design, as a unit identification insignia or a victory flag to ascribe to themselves the proverbial ferocity and toughness of pirates. In a non-naval context the skull and crossbones motif has additional meanings, for example, to signify a hazard such as poison.
- The Ahmadiyya flag, first designed in the 1930s during the second Caliphate. Just as the black colour absorbs visible light, similarly the black colour symbolizes the absorption of spiritual light.
- The flag of the Chetnik movement in Serbia and former Yugoslavia during the 20th century, with the words "Sloboda ili smrt ('liberty or death') inscribed in white under a skull.
- The flags of the Makhnovshchina and Kholodnyi Yar Republic during the Ukrainian War of Independence (1917-1921).
- The National League of Families POW/MIA flag was adopted in 1972 and represents support for U.S. Vietnam War soldiers, airmen, and sailors, especially those captured by the enemy.

=== Jihadism in the 20th/21st century ===
The "black flag of jihad" as used by jihadist militants since around the late 1990s.

In Ali Soufan's book The Black Banners, he explains the title by noting that quotes from various Hadiths regarding "Black Banners" of a "new army" taking over Khorasan have some kind of prophetic significance with many modern adherents of extremist jihadism. He notes that it is "not a coincidence" that Osama bin Laden made al-Qaeda's flag black. Soufan also notes that there is debate about whether the prophet Mohammed actually spoke some of the quoted Hadiths (such as one attributed to Abu Hurairah). He also notes that Sheikh Salman al-Ouda has said the Black Banner hadiths are not able to be authenticated.

== In society ==
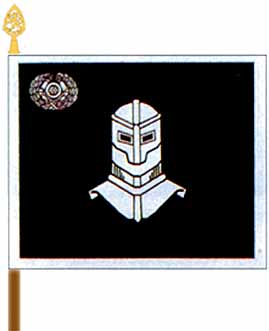
Flag of the Armoured Brigade of the Finnish Army.

Flag of the National League of POW/MIA Families.

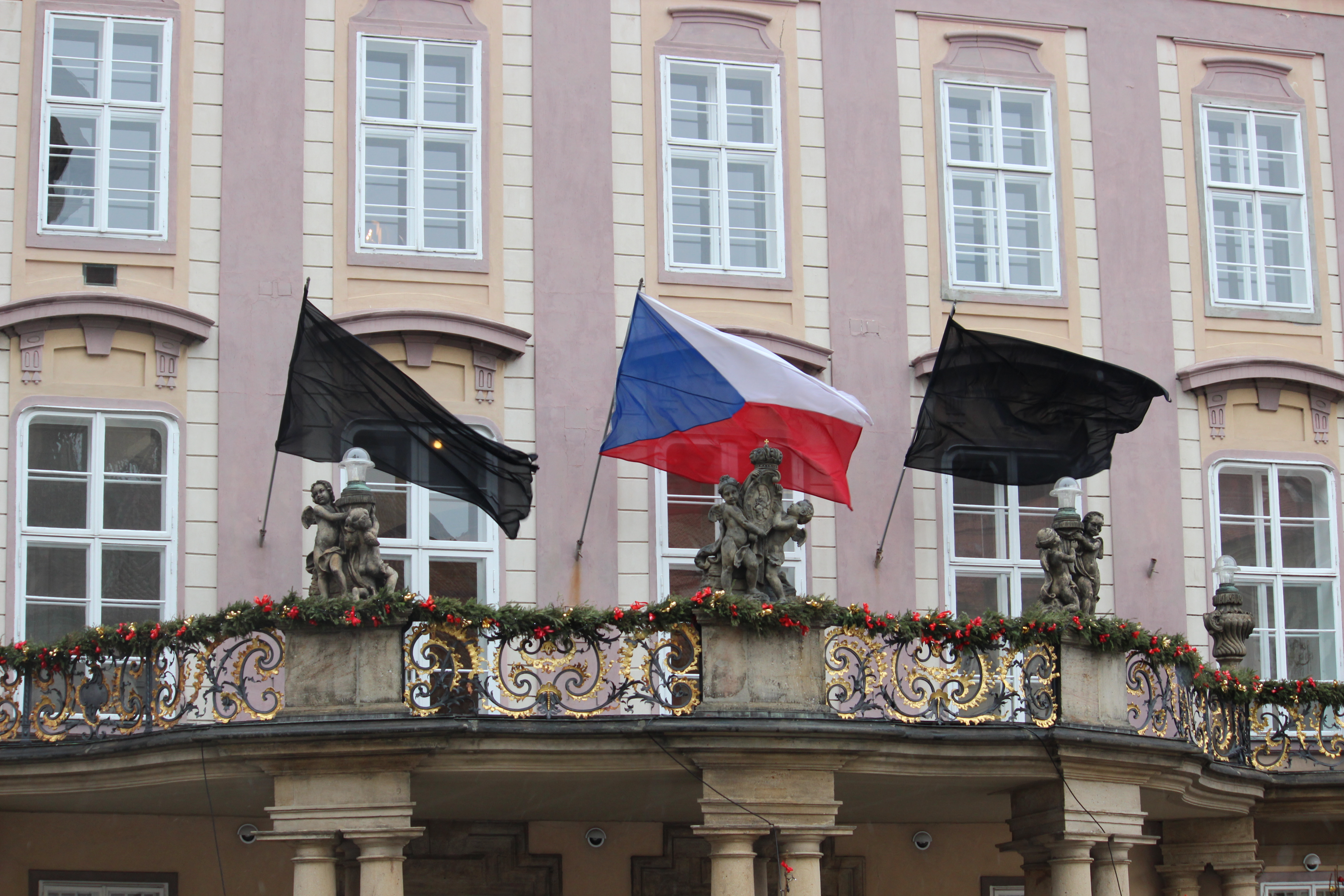
Flag of mourning in Prague Castle.

Flag of Cornwall, a county of England

- Black flags are often associated with funerals in the West, particularly state funerals and public mourning.
- The black flag is the symbol of the Jewish ultra-Orthodox, anti-Zionist group, Neturei Karta. It is flown as a sign of mourning over the creation of the State of Israel, most commonly on Israeli Independence Day.
- The Swedish Pirate Party has a black flag as a symbol, shaped like the letter P.
- In the German and Finnish militaries, black has been the traditional color of armored troops, which carries over to the flags of armored units. In Finland, also combat engineers have a black flag. The Armoured Brigade has a black flag defaced with a helmet, and engineer battalions have the black flags defaced with various symbols.
- The New Zealand Rugby Union team, commonly known as the All Blacks, have a predominantly black flag with a white fern superimposed: see List of New Zealand flags.
- The flag of Cornwall is mostly black with a white cross on it.

== As a signal in competitions and sports ==
The black flag is a racing flag used to signal a driver's disqualification. In sail racing, when the black flag is displayed with the preparatory signal, a boat that is over the starting line in the minute before the starting signal is immediately disqualified without a hearing. In some forms of racing, a black flag is used to disqualify competitors or indicate some other penalty (such as a forced pit stop in NASCAR).

== Fictional black flags ==
In The Silmarillion and other Middle-earth writings of J.R.R. Tolkien, the banner of the evil overlord Morgoth is described as being entirely black with no insignia. In The Lord of the Rings set several thousand years subsequently, the good Dúnedain bore a flag with solid black background as their royal standard, charged in silver with depictions of heirlooms from the founding of Gondor and Arnor including the Palantiri and the White Tree.

Flag of Morgoth

Flag of Gondor

Flag of Mordor

Flag of Minas Morgul

Flag of Isengard

Flag of Umbar

== See also ==
- Red flag (politics)
- Yellow flag
- Green flag
- Blue flag (disambiguation)
- Bonnie Blue Flag
- White flag
