= Firebase (disambiguation) =

Firebase may refer to:

== Military ==
- Fire support base, a type of artillery base
- Forward operating base, a type of military base
- Base of fire, a type of military force

== Computing ==
- Firebase, a subsidiary of Google
  - Firebase application platform, from Firebase Inc.
  - Firebase Cloud Messaging (FCM) from Firebase Inc.; formerly Google Cloud Messaging (GCM)

== Other uses ==
- Any basis of combustion, any one of the three legs of the fire triangle
- The point at which a flame emerges in a fire

== See also ==
- Fire (disambiguation)
- Base (disambiguation)
- FB (disambiguation)
- Firebrace
