= White flag =

Symbol of surrender

- Use: Civil and war flag, naval ensign
- Adopted: 29 July 1899 (Hague Convention I)

White flags have had different meanings throughout history and depending on the locale.

== Contemporary use ==
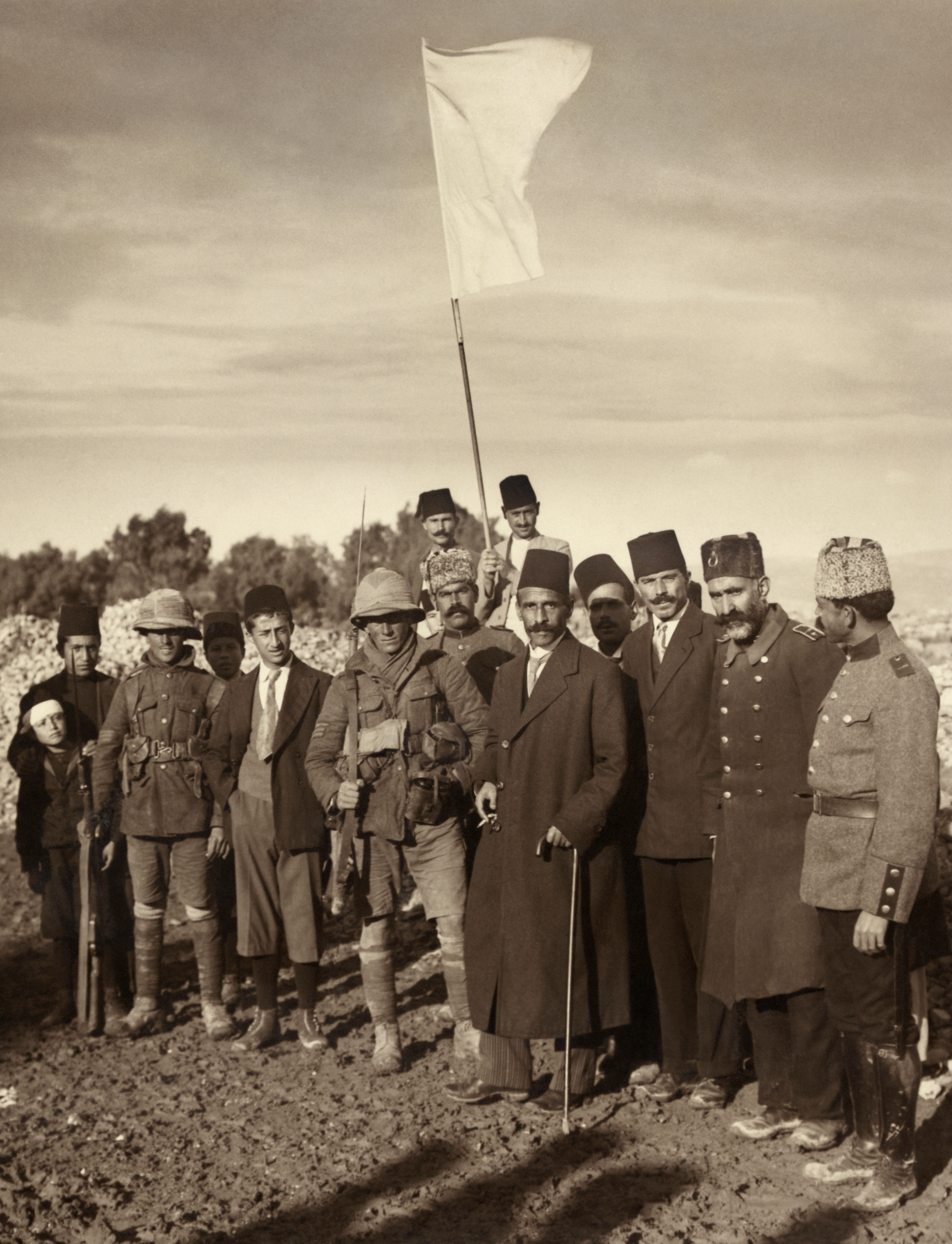
A white flag displayed during the Ottoman surrender of Jerusalem to Britain, 9 December 1917

The white flag is an internationally recognized protective sign of truce or ceasefire and for negotiation. It is also used to symbolize surrender since it is often the weaker party that requests negotiation. It is also flown on ships serving as cartels. A white flag signifies that an approaching negotiator is unarmed, intending to surrender, or wants to communicate. Persons carrying or waving a white flag are not to be fired upon, nor are they allowed to open fire. The use of the flag to request parley is included in the Hague Conventions of 1899 and 1907:

CHAPTER III -- On Flags of Truce

Article 32

An individual is considered a parlementaire who is authorized by one of the belligerents to enter into communication with the other, and who carries a white flag. He has a right to inviolability, as well as the trumpeter, bugler, or drummer, the flag-bearer, and the interpreter who may accompany him.

— Hague Convention of 1899, Laws of War : Laws and Customs of War on Land (Hague II); July 29, 1899
Annex to the Convention, Section II, Chapter III, Article 32

The improper use of the flag is forbidden by the rules of war and constitutes a war crime of perfidy. Numerous cases of such behavior have been reported in conflicts, such as combatants using white flags as a ruse to approach and attack enemy combatants or killings of combatants attempting to surrender by carrying white flags.

=== Origin ===
==== First mentions before widespread, Early Imperial China and Roman Empire ====
The first mention of the usage of white flags to surrender is made during the Eastern Han dynasty (25–220 CE). Writing during the age of the Roman Empire, the historian Cornelius Tacitus mentions a white flag of surrender in 109 CE. Before that time, Roman armies would surrender by holding their shields above their heads.

==== Widespread adoption in the Middle Ages and the Capet Dynasty ====
During the Middle Ages and in a political environment centered on oaths, flying another lord's banner or standard signified changing allegiance and loyalty. Thus, armies would wave the banner of the opposite side to signal surrender.

The French Capetian dynasty utilized a prominent white banner during this period, referred to at the time as the oriflamme. As head of House Capet, Philip II adopted a single white flag as the family's emblem, still closely identified with the Kings of France for several generations afterward. "Its very name – a derivation of 'golden flame' – shows that it was intended from its inception to represent the French crown".

This meaning is affirmed a few years later during a subsequent conflict between the French monarchy and the English throne. At the siege of Fréteval castle in 1194, the English knights defending the castle "came clad in white tunics, barefoot, holding up white cloths" to King Philip and his invading army to indicate their surrender. The color white, synonymous with the royal Capet flag, demonstrated the way medieval visual symbolism intertwined with feudal expressions of submission and dominance.

Through the 13th century, the precedent of utilizing white flags and banners to surrender to the French continued to proliferate after many French victories and across medieval Europe as Philip Augustus expanded the royal domain. Matthew Paris notes how during a 1231 rebellion against King Henry II of England in Wales, the princes pleading for mercy "came before him bearing the king's white banner". This correlated the white flag with signaling the transition of land or rulership.

Thus, the original meaning of waving a white flag was deeply tied to feudal custom, acknowledging and pledging loyalty or sanctuary to a specific lord and his noble standard. By the later Middle Ages, however, the distinct connection of the white symbol to House Capet and French royalty diminished as it gained wider currency as a gesture, indicating any general surrender or truce between opposing armies regardless of feudal loyalties.

Through diffusion over time and across Europe, the white flag of the Capets became divorced from a strict embodiment of Capetian suzerainty in war. Regardless of its shifting meaning, the basis of the tradition itself clearly originated in 12th-century medieval France.

During the Renaissance, the white flag was widely used in Western Europe to indicate an intent to surrender. The color white was not used as the color of the king of France anymore but instead to generally indicate a person was exempt from combat; heralds bore white wands, prisoners or hostages captured in battle would attach a piece of white paper to their hat or helmet, and garrisons that had surrendered and been promised safe passage would carry white batons.

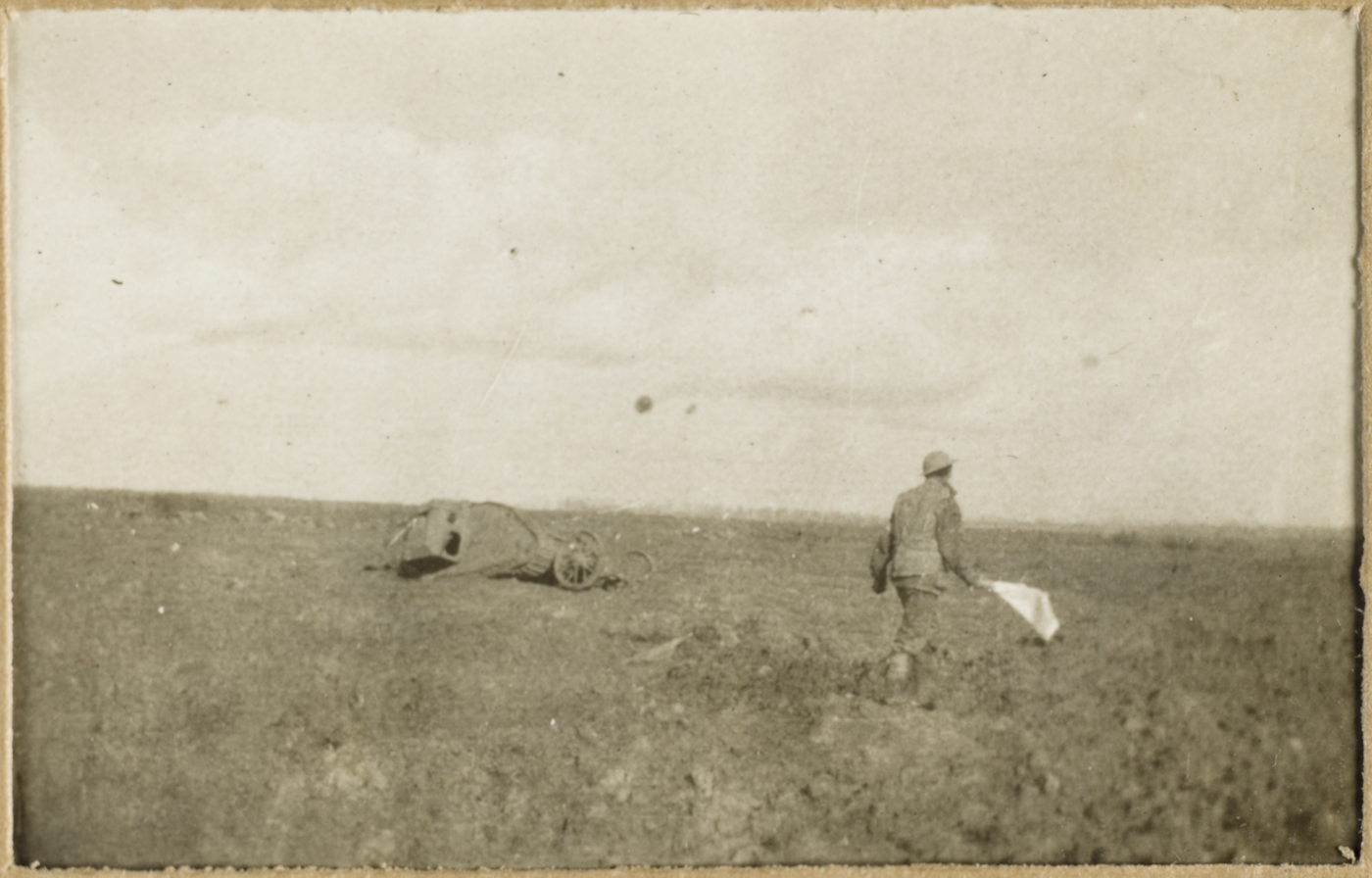
An Australian soldier looking for wounded under the protection of a white flag, Western Front

Its use may have expanded across continents (e.g., Portuguese chronicler Gaspar Correia, writing in the 1550s, claims that in 1502, an Indian ruler, the Zamorin of Calicut, dispatched negotiators bearing a "white cloth tied to a stick", "as a sign of peace", to his enemy Vasco da Gama. In 1625, Hugo Grotius in De jure belli ac pacis (On the Law of War and Peace), one of the foundational texts in international law, recognized the white flag as a "sign, to which use has given a signification"; it was "a tacit sign of demanding a parley, and shall be as obligatory, as if expressed by words".

== Islamic use ==
The Umayyad dynasty (661–750) used white as their symbolic color as a reminder of Muhammad's first battle at Badr.

The Alids and the Fatimid dynasty also used white in opposition to the Abbasids, who used black as their dynastic color. For the same reason, the color white was adopted by other Shia regimes, like the Qarmatians of Bahrayn, and the Zaydi rulers in northern Iran and Yemen.

The Sunni Khanate of Kokand (1709–1876) also used a white banner.

Flag of Afghanistan under Taliban ruling

The white flag was the official flag of the Taliban-ruled Islamic Emirate of Afghanistan between September 1996 and October 1997. It is sometimes used as an unofficial variant of the current flag which includes the Shahada written in black on a white field.

== Ancien Régime in France ==
During the period of the Ancien Régime, starting in the early 17th century, the royal standard of France became a plain white flag as a symbol of purity, sometimes covered in fleur-de-lis when in the presence of the king or bearing the ensigns of the Order of the Holy Spirit.

The white color was also used as a symbol of military command, by the commanding officer of a French army. It would be featured on a white scarf attached to the regimental flag as to recognize French units from foreign ones and avoid friendly fire incidents. The French troops fighting in the American Revolutionary War fought under the white flag.

The French Navy used a plain white ensign for ships of the line. Smaller ships might have used other standards, such as a fleur-de-lis on white field. Commerce and private ships were authorized to use their own designs to represent France, but were forbidden to fly the white ensign.

During the French Revolution, in 1794, the blue, white and red Tricolore was adopted as the official national flag. The white flag quickly became a symbol of French royalists. (The white part of the French Tricolor is itself originally derived from the old Royal flag, the tricolor having been designed when the revolution still aimed at constitutional monarchy rather than a republic; this aspect of the Tricolor was, however, soon forgotten.)

During the Bourbon Restoration, the white flag replaced the Tricolore, which by then was seen as a symbol of regicide.

It was finally abandoned in 1830, with the July Revolution, with the definitive use of the blue, white and red flag.

In 1873, an attempt to reestablish the monarchy failed when Henri of Artois, the Count of Chambord refused to accept the Tricolore. He demanded the return of the white flag before he would accept the throne, a condition that proved unacceptable.

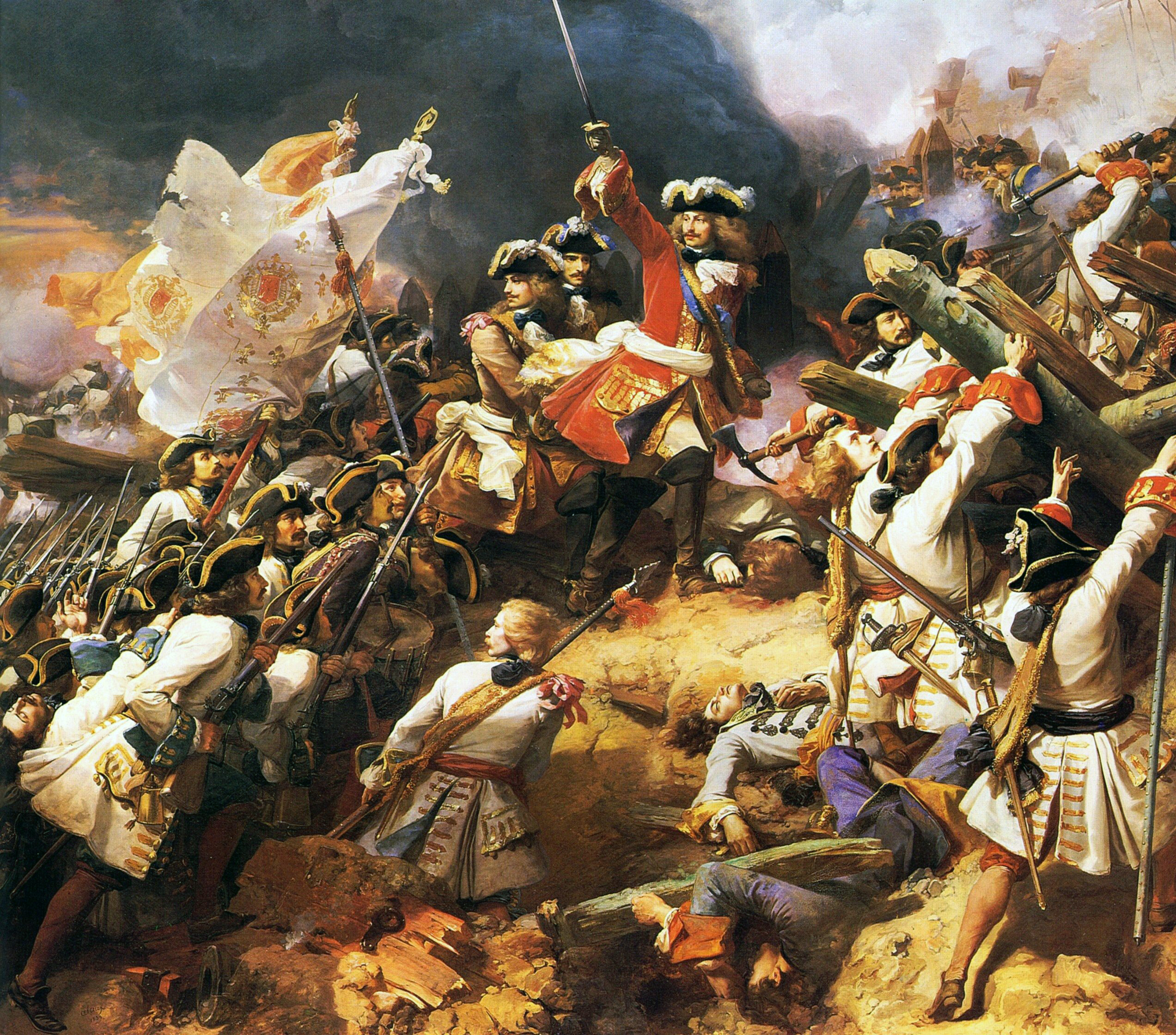
French white regimental flag at the battle of Denain (1712)

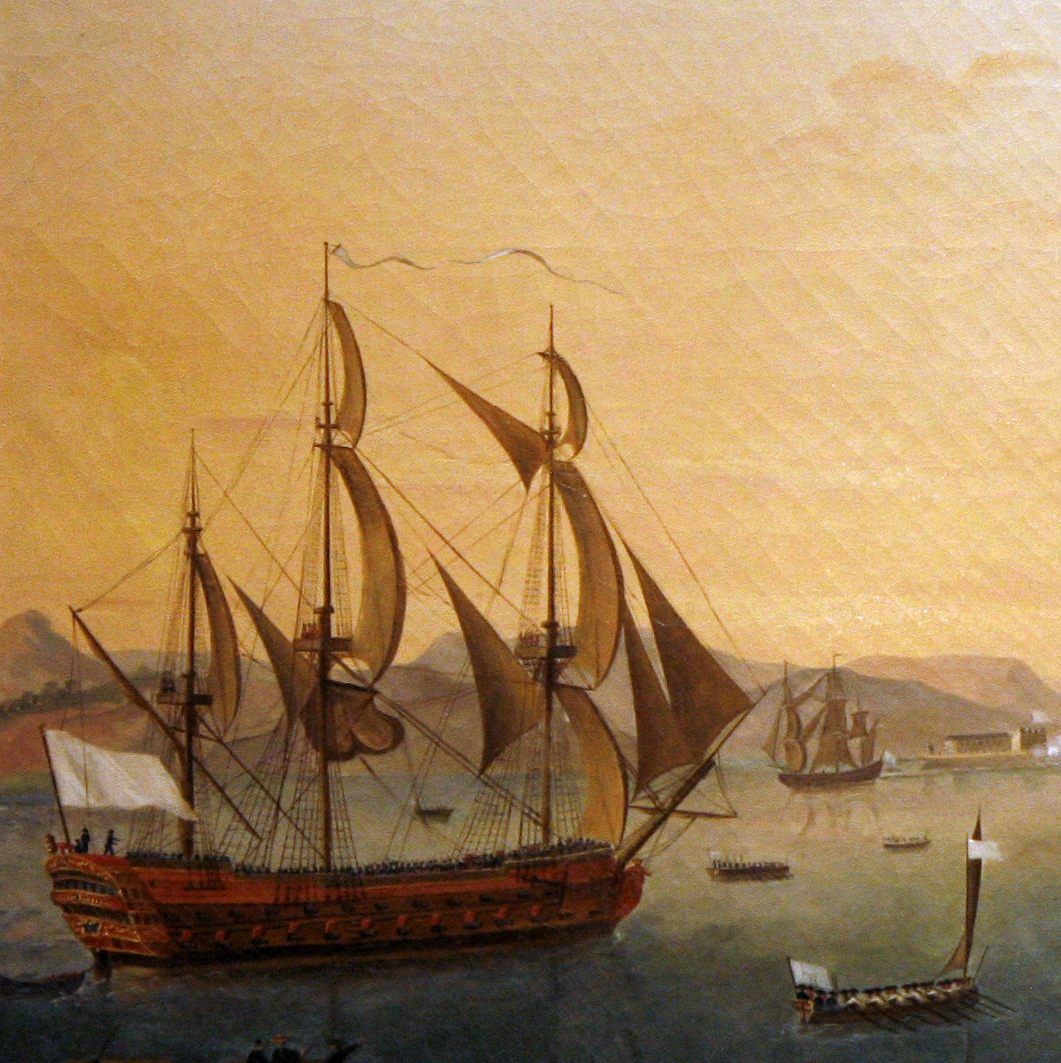
A French ship of the line at the Battle of Martinique (1780)

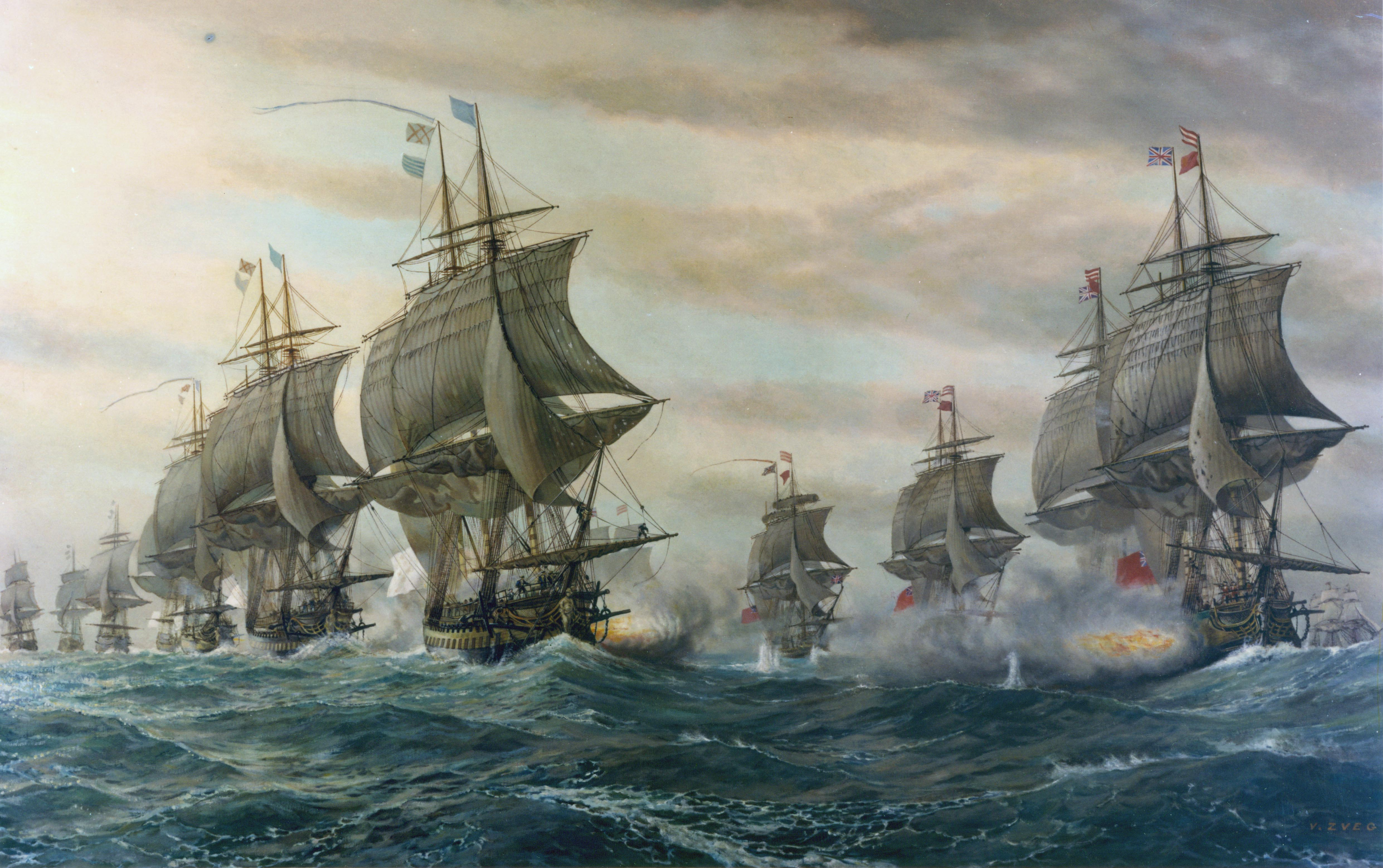
French ships (left), flying the white flag of the Monarchy, at the battle of Chesapeake (1781)

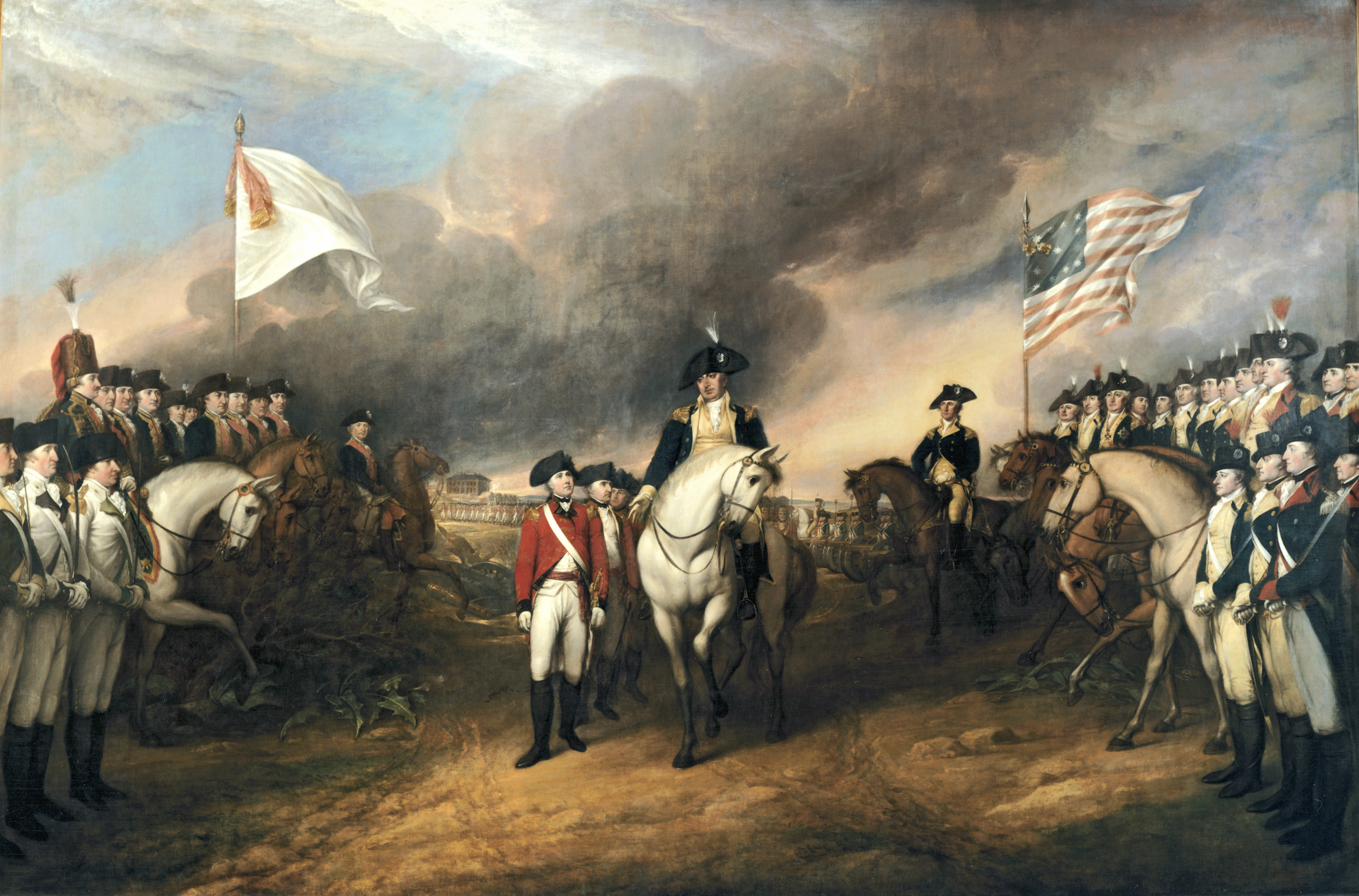
Surrender of the British after Yorktown in 1781. The French (left) are displaying the white ensign.

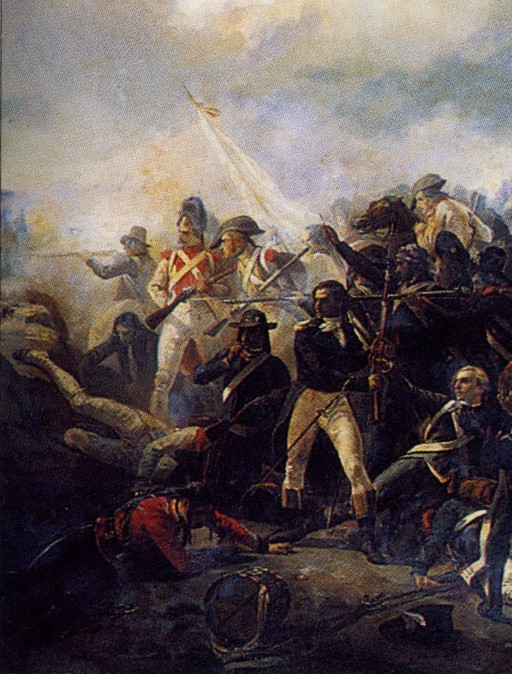
Royalist army used the white Bourbon ensign, during the French Revolutionary Wars (here, the battle of Quiberon, 1795)

== Flag of Antarctica ==
Original flag flown by the Discovery, stored at the Royal Museums Greenwich

In 1929, members of the British Australian and New Zealand Antarctic Research Expedition on RRS Discovery used white cotton sheeting to improvise a courtesy ensign (a flag used as a token of respect by vessels while in foreign waters) for a continent without a flag of its own. It is now in the National Maritime Museum in London. The white flag was used to represent Antarctica on at least two occasions on the voyage to Antarctica. On 1 August 1929, The Times noted that "the ship was flying the Union Jack at her forepeak, the white Antarctic flag at the foremast, and the Australian flag at the stern."

== See also ==
- Chamade, a musical equivalent of a flag of truce
- White Flag (band)
- "White Flag" (Dido song)
- "White flags over Port Stanley"
- List of flags
  - Diplomatic flag
  - List of flags by color combination § White
    - Black Flag (disambiguation)
    - Blue flag (disambiguation) (Blue Revolution)
    - Green flag
    - Red flag (disambiguation)
  - Racing flags § White flag
