= Peel (tactic) =

Infantry retreat technique

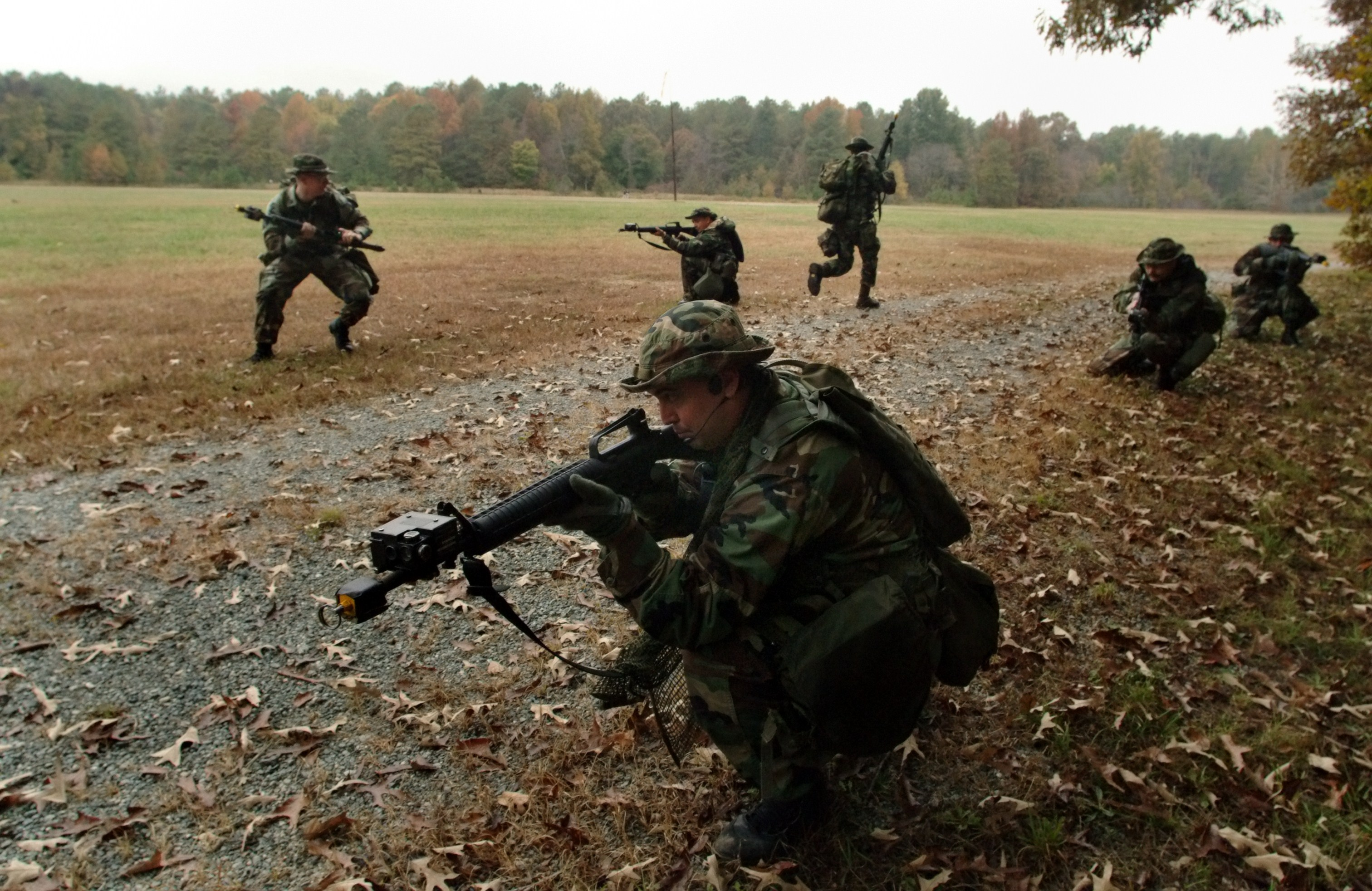
Center peel during patrol formation and contact drills training in the US Navy.

A peel (sometimes nicknamed an Australian peel or Aussie Peeloff) is a type of retreat conducted by infantry which allows them to maintain effective defensive suppressive fire while retreating. Though generally considered a modern-day infantry technique, the concept dates back to Greek and Roman times. This particular tactic is more specifically designed for situations where smaller groups of infantry withdraw from an engagement of a much larger force.

== Types of peel ==
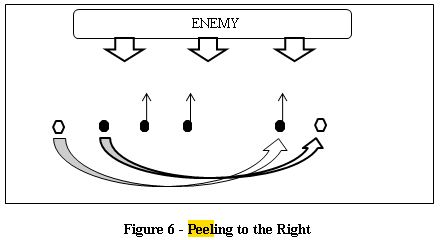
Diagram of an infantry element conducting a peel to the right.

A peel begins with an infantry element deciding to disengage from contact with an opposing force. The soldiers begin by using suppressing fire to delay the enemy's attack and advance. Upon issuance of the verbal command to initiate the peel, the infantryman closest to the enemy, in the opposite direction of the intended post-peel movement, ceases fire and works his way behind the element towards the other side, takes a position beyond from the farthest soldier on this side in the direction of disengagement, and resumes suppressing fire. Then, the process repeats until the party has safely disengaged the target. One specific type of peel is a center peel, in which the retreat is conducted in between two files of the squad in column formation, allowing for the squad to conduct effective suppressive fire to the flanks. The center peel is typically used when linear terrain features dictate that the element must move in column formation, or when the squad unexpectedly makes contact while in a column formation.

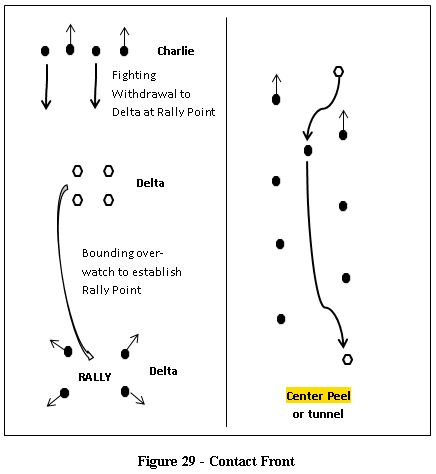
Diagram of an infantry element conducting a center peel.

== References in film and literature ==
The center peel tactic was demonstrated in the final gunfight of the 2003 movie, Tears of the Sun, where Lieutenant Waters (Bruce Willis) directs his men away from a significantly larger group of aggressive Nigerian troops.

This tactic was also shown in episode 6 of season 2 of the Amazon Prime show, Jack Ryan, where a small group of 3 soldiers were ambushed in a ravine.

The peel tactic can also be seen in the 1995 film Heat as the LAPD intercept the heist crew as they are leaving the bank.

== See also ==
- Fire and movement
- Bounding overwatch
- Overwatch (military tactic)
- Siege
