= BF =

BF may refer to:

== People ==
- Best friend, in internet slang
- Boyfriend, a male romantic or sexual partner
- Bayani Fernando (born 1946), Filipino politician

== Places ==
- BF Homes Parañaque, a subdivision in the Philippines
- Bahamas (LOC MARC, obsolete NATO and FIPS country code BF)
- Baitul Futuh, a mosque in London
- Beaver Falls, Pennsylvania, a city in western Pennsylvania
- Bonners Ferry, Idaho, a town in Idaho, US
- Burkina Faso (ISO 3166-1 alpha-2 country code BF)
  - .bf, the ccTLD for Burkina Faso

== Businesses and organizations ==
- Bibliotekarforbundet, the Danish Union of Librarians
- Bluebird Cargo (IATA airline designator BF)
- Border Force, a law-enforcement structure in the UK
- British Fascists, a fascist organisation from the 1920s

== Science and technology ==
- BF (protein), an initialism for B factor, a triggering protein of the alternative pathway of complement activation
- Bayes factor, a ratio used in Bayesian statistics to compare the evidence for two competing models
- Bellman–Ford algorithm, a graph and tree search algorithm
- Blast furnace, a type of metallurgical furnace
- Board foot, a unit of measure of lumber
- Big Falcon Rocket, precursor of SpaceX Starship
- Boron monofluoride (BF), a chemical compound
- Brainfuck, a programming language

== Other uses ==
- Batters faced, a baseball statistic
- BattleForge, a real-time strategy game produced by Electronic Arts
- Battlefront, a contested armed frontier between opposing forces
- B.F.'s Daughter, an American film released in 1948
- Bigfoot, a mythological ape-like creature
- Bongo Frontier, a pickup truck built by Kia Motors
- Breastfeeding
- Blue film, or Pornographic film

== See also ==
- Black Flag (disambiguation)
- FB (disambiguation)
