= Blue board =

Blue board may refer to:

- Blue Board (software) Commodore Bulletin Board system from the 1980s
- Blue sign, used by inland waterways vessels in Europe performing a special manoeuvre
