= Bounding overwatch =

Military tactic

A diagram showing the basic principle of a bounding overwatch maneuver; each bracket shows the overwatch positions taken by each team as they advance to positions 1 through 4 in sequence

Bounding overwatch (also known as leapfrogging, moving overwatch, or the buddy system) is a military tactic of alternating movement of coordinated units to allow, if necessary, suppressive fire in support of offensive forward "fire and movement" or defensive "center peel" disengagement.

As members of a unit (element to platoon level) take an overwatch posture, other members advance to cover; these two groups continually switch roles as they close with the enemy. This process may be done by "leapfrogging" with fireteams, but is usually done within fireteams along a squad/platoon battle line to simulate an overwhelming movement towards the enemy and make it more difficult for the enemy to distinguish specific targets.

This military tactic takes continuous training and focused coordination to be effectively practiced on the modern battlefield. It was first developed in World War II, when the prevalence of man-portable automatic weapons made suppressing fire possible.

== Example of tactic ==
A squad (2–3 fireteams) in an urban combat zone must advance to a building 100 feet away, crossing an intersection they believe might be in enemy rifle sights from elevated buildings. If the team simply made a run for it, they expose themselves to potential enemy fire without protection.

This is where bounding overwatch comes into play.

One fireteam takes an overwatch position while the other team bounds (a bound is a 3–5 second rush) to a new covered position. This way there is always an overwatch team that can react instantaneously to enemy fire (the bounding team would have to stop, take cover, locate the enemy, and aim before they could return fire). Once the covered position is reached by the bounding team, they now assume overwatch positions while the other team then becomes the bounding team.

By using bounding overwatch, this unit is able to effectively move through a hostile urban street and intersection, without unnecessarily exposing themselves to enemy fire.

If enemy contact is made, the overwatch team opens fire and the unit takes up a process called fire and maneuver which is very similar to bounding overwatch in that teams alternate firing and maneuvering. During fire and maneuver, the commander takes more direct control of team movements and positions.

In infantry tactics, leapfrogging (also called The Buddy System) is a technique for advancing personnel and/or equipment on or past a target area being defended by an opposing force. This technique is taught in U.S. Army Basic Training and reinforced with all unit and advanced training throughout a soldier's career. It can be modified for use with equipment as well as personnel.

== Leapfrogging ==
Leapfrogging requires dividing an attacking force into at least two parts (for example Team A and Team B). The teams agree on a signal for role assignment; for existing units, the signal is often preset and practiced. Team A will redirect or suppress the enemy by firing on the target while Team B changes positions. When the signal is given, the teams switch roles: Team B redirects or suppresses while Team A moves. Before changing positions, the moving team will usually identify a location that advances them on the target, has adequate cover and line of sight to engage the target. Variations of this technique may employ more than two teams (with as few as one person) in the suppressing or moving roles. A variation may be chosen based on the size and equipment of the defending force, as well as the distance and frequency of available cover. In situations where the defending force is unaware of the attacking force, it may be possible to hold fire and conduct part or all of the movement without being observed.

== See also ==
- Fire and movement
- Center peel
- Overwatch (military tactic)
- Siege
