= Firebrace =

Firebrace is a surname. Notable people with the surname include:

- Aylmer Firebrace (1886–1972), British Royal Navy officer and fire chief
- Firebrace baronets
- Sir Henry Firebrace (c. 1619–1691), courtier to Charles I, Clerk of the Green Cloth to Charles II
- Isaiah Firebrace (born 1999), Australian singer
- Roy C. Firebrace (1889–1974), British army officer

== See also ==
- Firebase
  - Firebase (disambiguation)
