= Jamie Paulin Ramirez =

American convert to Islam

- Arrested: 2009; Ireland; Irish officials
- Detained at: Federal Correctional Institution, Waseca
- Penalty: 8 years
- Spouse: Ali Charaf Damache

Jamie Paulin Ramirez is an American convert to Islam who confessed to a role in a plot to murder Lars Vilks, a Swedish artist some Muslims accused of blasphemy for having drawn the Islamic prophet Muhammad.

In 2009, Ramirez traveled to Ireland, at the same time as Colleen LaRose, where she married Ali Charaf Damache, who stands accused of recruiting other individuals to a terrorist cell, that plotted to murder Vilks. Commentators noted that both Ramirez and LaRose were blonde, with blue eyes, and that Damache and his colleagues sought out blonde-haired, blue-eyed converts because, once radicalized, they would find it easy to cross borders without suspicion.

Upon her arrival, she married Damache.

Damache's assassination plans centered around LaRose. However LaRose is reported to have found Damache much less impressive in person, and to have tried to tip off the FBI herself, thinking they would pay to return her to the USA. LaRose did return to the United States, and openly acknowledged her role in the plot, implicating Damache and Ramirez. LaRose received a ten-year sentence, and Ramirez an eight-year sentence.
