= Fire and movement =

Basic modern military low-level unit tactic

Schematic depiction of the fire and movement tactic.

Fire and movement, or fire and maneuver, is the basic modern military low-level unit tactic used to maneuver on the battlefield in the presence of the enemy, especially when under fire. It involves heavy use of all available cover, and highly-coordinated exchanges of rapid movement by some elements of the squad or platoon while other elements cover this movement with suppressive fire. It is used both to advance on enemy positions as part of an attack, or withdrawal from current positions under attack by the enemy. The moving and supporting (suppressing) elements may be teams or individuals, and may quickly and continuously exchange roles until the entire unit completes the maneuver objective. Some members will specialize more in different roles within fire and movement as fits their range, equipment, terrain, and ability to maneuver. This is usually applied to standard infantry tactics, but forms of this are also used with armored fighting vehicles or when supported by artillery or airpower.

== Overview ==
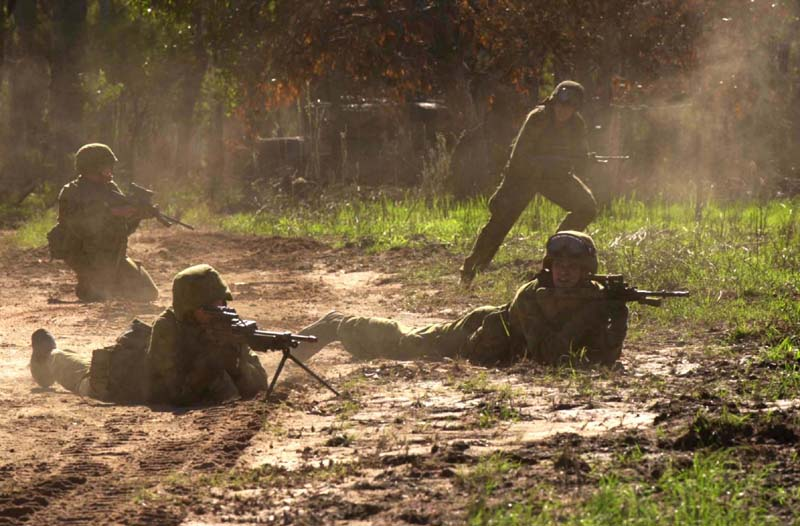
Australian soldiers conducting a fire and movement operation during a combined arms training exercise, 2001

Fire and movement can be performed by any unit made up of at least two soldiers. The first part of the military unit suppresses the enemy by firing from behind cover, while the second advances. After a short time, the advancing unit will halt behind cover and open fire, allowing the first unit to advance. The two parts of the unit will repeat the cycle until the objective is met. Enemy suppression can also be achieved with direct and/or indirect fire from combat support units. Artillery, mortars and armor are a few examples of combat support units often used in fire and movement.

In the United States military, a basic fire and movement tactic is called bounding overwatch. There also exists several variations of overwatch, generally adding further description to more accurately describe the specific maneuver.

A unit fires upon an enemy to distract or suppress them allowing another unit to assault, flank or encircle the enemy. The enemy will be pinned down and cannot react, and will be forced to take cover until the flanking unit engages them.

=== Phase 1: Suppression ===
Heavy and continuous suppressive fire keeps an opponent in a defensive posture (hunkered in their foxholes instead of taking aimed shots) and therefore limits the enemy's overall firepower. Suppressive fire also prevents the enemy from properly assessing the attack and organizing a coherent and coordinated defense or counter-attack.

=== Phase 2: Advance ===
While a base of fire is set up, the second unit will advance to cover in front, in the process setting up a new base of fire at this point. After a new base of fire has been set up, the first unit will advance, under cover of the new fire base, to a new position and set up another base of fire.

=== Phase 3: Assault ===
These actions are repeated until the units have closed upon the enemy position. At this point they engage directly with the enemy, often with grenade-throwing, close-quarters battle techniques, and hand-to-hand combat.

== History ==
The Swedish king Gustavus Adolphus was likely the first to use the tactic in wartime, in the Thirty Years' War, against his Habsburg opponents.

Fire and movement became particularly important when more and more rifled muskets and breech-loading weapons, later followed by machine guns, were fielded on the battlefields of the 19th century. The increased accuracy, range and rate of fire translated into more firepower, allowing smaller units to operate more independently. This marked the transition from first- to second-generation warfare that saw the increasing application of fire and movement on the tactical level.

During the First Boer War, it was a standard Boer tactic, and contributed to a series of victories, culminating at the Battle of Majuba Hill.

According to Stephen Biddle, the effective use of fire and maneuver was the key to ending the stalemates on the lines of the Western Front during the final months of World War I. Since that time, he argues, mastery of fire and maneuver has been one of the central components of successful military tactics in modern land warfare.

== In film ==
This tactic was used in the British film, Bravo Two Zero. A small unit of SAS soldiers is attacked from the rear in open desert by a mechanized unit of the Iraq Army. Turning to face the threat, the SAS fought in a series of bounds and overwatches while utilizing overwhelming firepower to get within hand grenade range, thereby eliminating the attack from the rear.

The tactic is also used in the Michael Mann film Heat. After a bank robbery is foiled by police, the criminal gang use their overwhelming firepower (automatic rifles, versus the police's handguns and shotguns) to escape. The film is frequently cited as one of the most realistic depictions of fire and movement in cinema, and has been shown to Army and Special Forces members as a classic example of the practice. Ex-Special Air Service member Andy McNab was a technical advisor for the film.

Fire and Cover tactics are used in the film Full Metal Jacket when they move into the destroyed city to engage the sniper.

== See also ==
- Bounding overwatch
- Center peel
- Infiltration tactics
- Overwatch (military tactic)
- Siege
