= FB =

FB, Fb, or fb may refer to:

== Arts and media ==
- F♭ (musical note)
- FB (band), an electronic music collaboration of Benny Benassi and Ferry Corsten
- Facebook, a social networking website, also known as FB.com
  - Meta Platforms, formerly Facebook Inc (Nasdaq: FB), parent company of Facebook
- Friendship book, a booklet swapped amongst pen pals
- Frostbite (game engine), a video game engine
- FB, known as Trucksy in the US, an old green pickup truck from Roary the Racing Car
- Fat Bastard, a character in Austin Powers films

== Science and technology ==
=== Computing ===
- Framebuffer, in computer technology
- FreeBASIC, a 32-bit compiler using BASIC syntax for DOS, Windows, and Linux
- FictionBook, an open XML-based e-book format hailing from Russia

=== Other uses in science and technology ===
- F B swamp vehicle, a Japanese military vehicle used for crossing difficult swampy terrain
- Fast busy, or reorder tone, a type of telephone signal
- Feedback, in signaling systems
- Femtobarn, a small unit of area used in high energy physics
- Fluidized bed, a special technology used in energy, reactor, chemical engineering etc.
- Ninth generation Honda Civic
- Hyundai FB, a series of buses manufactured by Hyundai Motor Company
- Foreign body, any object originating outside the body

== Sport ==
- Fenerbahçe, a Turkish sports club
- Fly ball, a type of batted ball or a pitching stat in baseball
- Football
- Fullback (American football), a position in American football
- Full-back (association football), a position in association football

== Other uses ==
- Bulgaria Air (Bulgarian: България еър, IATA code FB), the flag carrier airline of Bulgaria
- Firebase or Fire support base, an artillery encampment
- Footbridge (fb on some maps), a bridge designed for pedestrians
- Fremont Bank, a US based retail and commercial bank
- FB "Łucznik" Radom, a Polish defence industry enterprise from Radom that produces firearms

== See also ==
- BF (disambiguation)
