= White flags over Port Stanley =

Statement by Margaret Thatcher

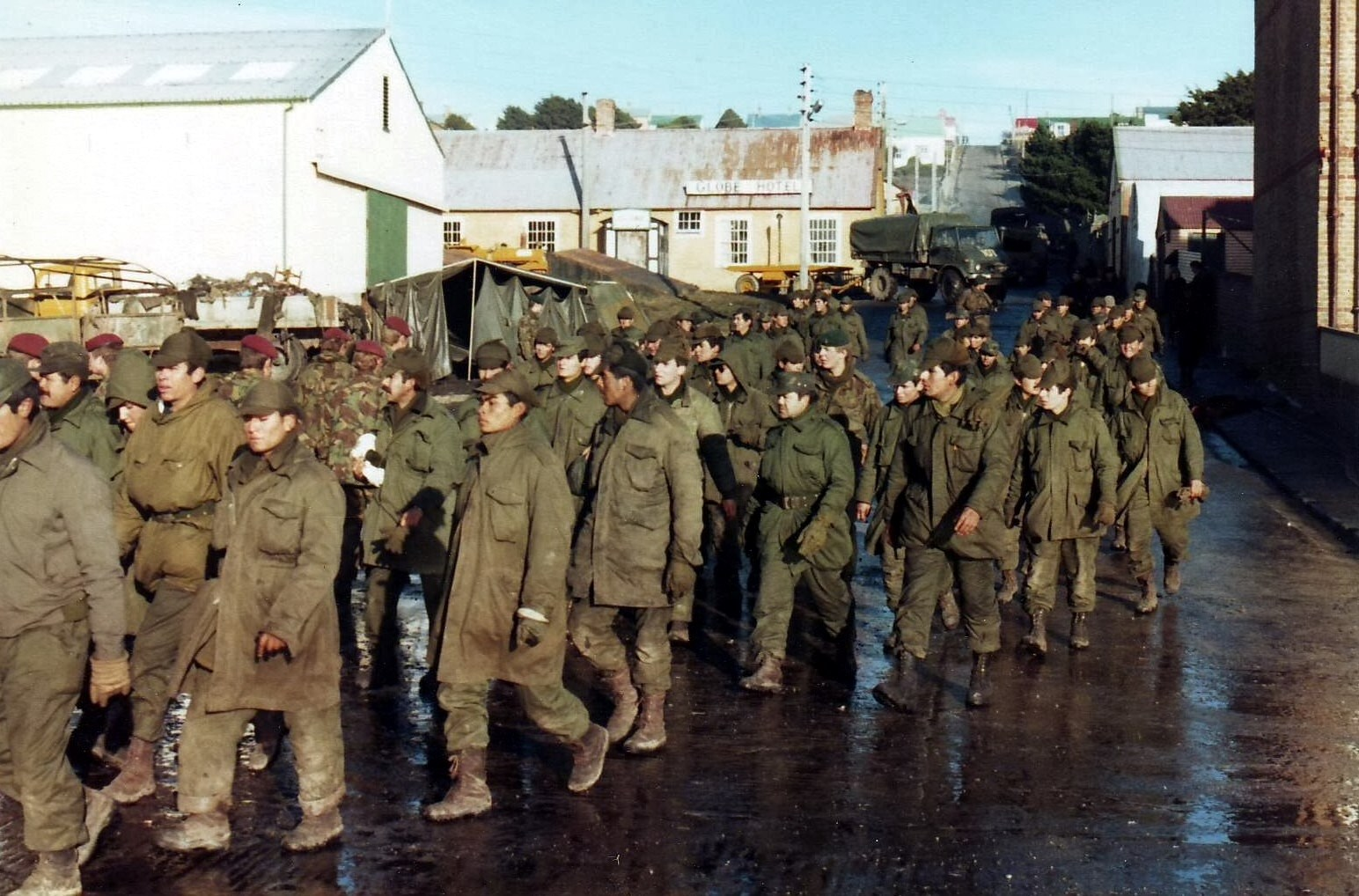
Argentine prisoners of war in Port Stanley, 16 June 1982

At 10:15 pm (BST) on the night of 14 June 1982, British prime minister Margaret Thatcher announced to the House of Commons that negotiations had begun for the surrender of the Argentine invasion force in the Falkland Islands, ending the Falklands War. Her statement noted that "they are reported to be flying white flags over Port Stanley", the capital of the Falklands. This was based on an erroneous report from a front-line unit; in fact, no white flags are known to have been flown, though Argentine resistance ended, and a ceasefire was in place. The surrender was finalised by 1:30 am BST on 15 June. Thatcher's statement was welcomed from all sides in the House, and she left to join celebrating crowds in Downing Street. She later described the statement as "perhaps the proudest moment of my life".

== Background ==
Map of the Battle of Wireless Ridge, showing the locations of earlier engagements

Argentina invaded the British dependent territory of the Falkland Islands on 2 April 1982 and South Georgia on 3 April. An Argentine military governor, Brigadier General Mario Benjamín Menéndez, was installed to administer the territory. The Conservative government of Margaret Thatcher quickly assembled a task force to retake the islands, with the first elements sailing south on 5 April. British troops landed at San Carlos Bay on 21 May and fought their way across East Falkland towards the capital, Port Stanley. On 11 June British forces, by now led by Royal Marines Major General Jeremy Moore, launched their attack on the outer ring of the Argentine Port Stanley defences in the battles of Two Sisters, Mount Harriet and Mount Longdon. After a pause to reposition troops and ammunition, the British launched the 13 June attacks on Mount Tumbledown, a key feature in the defences, and Wireless Ridge, which overlooks Port Stanley. After taking these positions, the British troops noticed the Argentine forces withdrawing into Port Stanley and began an advance towards the town.

== White flags ==
Port Stanley, 16 June 1982

Major Bill Dawson, the second-in-command of the 7th Duke of Edinburgh's Own Gurkha Rifles who were part of the advance, reported hearing from the unit's A Company that a white flag was visible in Port Stanley. He was filmed leaving his communications tent on Two Sisters mountain, still wearing his headphones, to tell waiting reporters, "I can confirm that white flags are flying over Stanley, the Argentines have surrendered – Bloody marvellous". Shortly afterwards an RAF pilot flying a Hawker Siddeley Harrier GR. 3 was ordered to abort a ground attack run by his ground-based forward air controller due to the report of white flags. The pilot reported this news to Captain Linley Middleton and Rear Admiral Sandy Woodward upon his return to HMS Hermes. This was the first that the naval task force, commanded by Woodward, had heard of the flags.

The Falkland Islanders in Port Stanley always insisted they had seen no white flags. Dawson stated in 2002 that the report of white flags was probably a mistake as he could find no one from A Company that admitted to making the initial report. Dawson considered that "it was probably someone's washing hanging on a clothes line". The commander of 3 Commando Brigade, Brigadier Julian Thompson, noted that the brigade's reconnaissance unit heard the message "white flags over Stanley" over the radio, but on looking at Port Stanley through their binoculars could see nothing that corroborated the report. A marine reported a white object, but he stated that "it looks more like someone's knickers on the line". Lieutenant Colonel David Chaundler of the 2nd Battalion, Parachute Regiment, which led the advance into Stanley recalled seeing no white flags and thought that Dawson was speaking metaphorically.

== Thatcher's statement ==
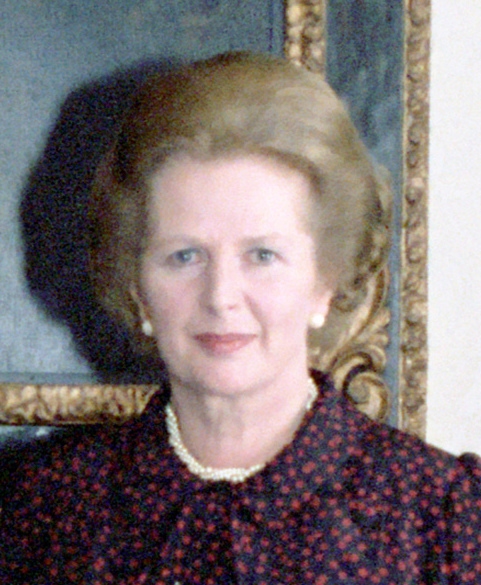
Thatcher in June 1982

Prime Minister Margaret Thatcher had spent 13 June at the Royal Navy's Northwood Headquarters in Hertfordshire, observing the war's final battles. On the morning of 14 June, she held a tense meeting with her war cabinet, whose members were expecting news of an Argentine collapse. The first reports of white flags over Port Stanley had reached London by around 1 pm BST (9 am Falklands time). Thatcher, intent on controlling the moment of the announcement, imposed a press blackout. She wanted the report to be broadcast live on the ITN News at Ten, snubbing the earlier BBC Nine O'Clock News.

The House of Commons sat from 2:30 pm that day in a session dominated by routine answers to questions made by ministers for the Department of Industry and the attorney-general Michael Havers. Discussions on several foreign and defence matters followed this. At 4 pm, the House entered a lengthy debate on a motion by Labour member of parliament (MP) for Doncaster Harold Walker to send a humble address to Elizabeth II to annul orders made by the Conservative government abolishing eight industrial training boards. The motion was unsuccessful, and Thatcher was among those that voted against it at 10 pm.

After the vote, at around 10:15 pm (6:15 pm Falklands time), Thatcher raised a point of order to the speaker, George Thomas, asking to provide information to the House on the Falklands War. Thomas granted her permission, and she made the following statement:

After successful attacks last night, General Moore decided to press forward. The Argentines retreated. Our forces reached the outskirts of Port Stanley. Large numbers of Argentine soldiers threw down their weapons. They are reported to be flying white flags over Port Stanley. Our troops have been ordered not to fire except in self-defence. Talks are now in progress between General Menendez and our Deputy Commander, Brigadier Waters, about the surrender of the Argentine forces on East and West Falkland. I shall report further to the House tomorrow.

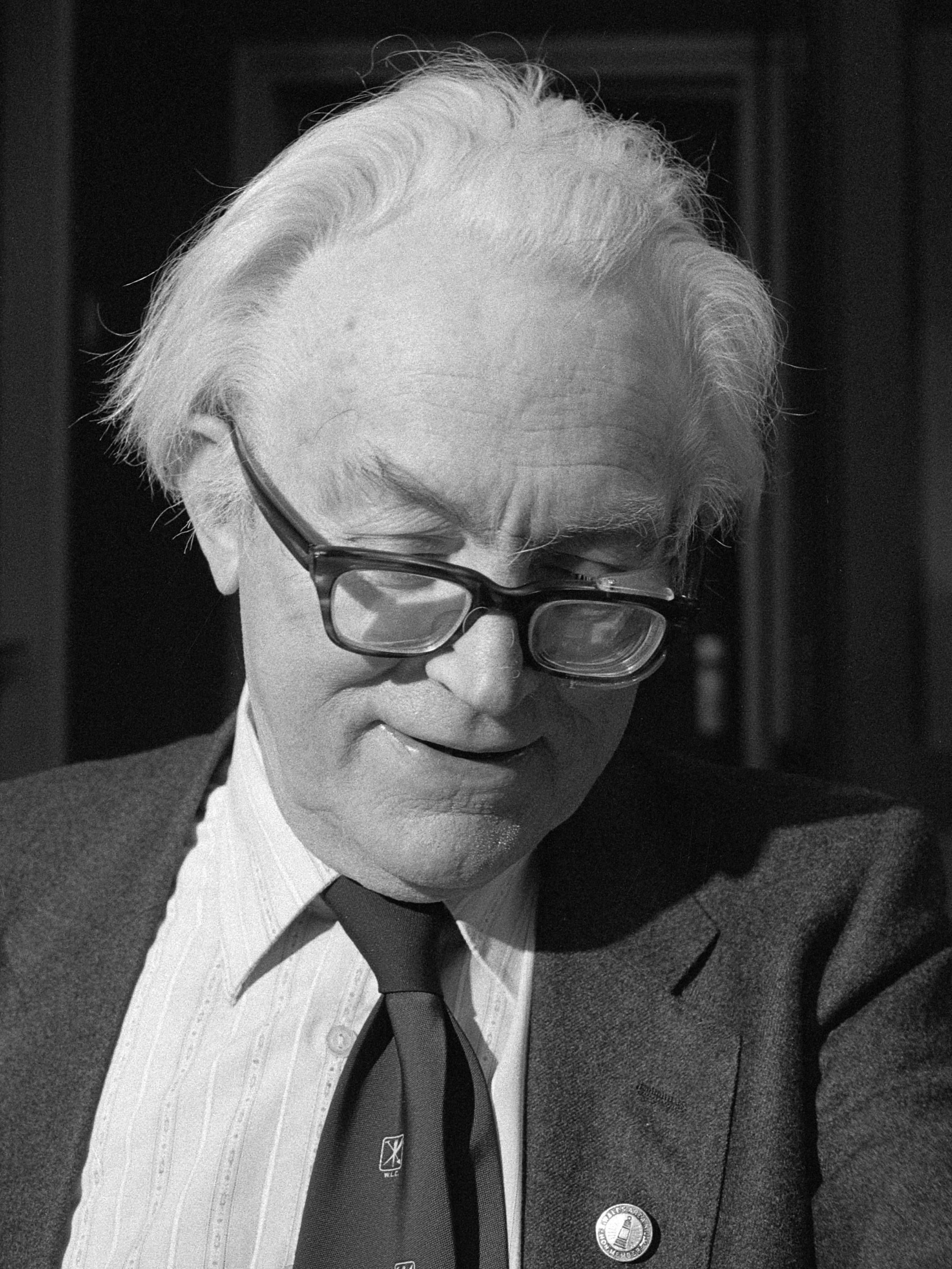
Labour leader Michael Foot (pictured in 1981) thanked Thatcher for her statement

The statement was followed by cries of hear, hear, the traditional expression of acclamation, from across the House. The Leader of the Opposition, the Labour Party's Michael Foot, spoke to thank Thatcher for sharing the news and to welcome "an end to the bloodshed". He stated that there would be "widespread, genuine rejoicing", echoing a remark made by Thatcher in April 1982 following the successful liberation of South Georgia by British forces. Foot acknowledged that he had disagreements with Thatcher on some issues, including the origin of the war, but hoped that the House could work to "transform what has occurred into benefits for our country as a whole" and his party would work towards this.

Liberal Party leader David Steel also spoke to say that the whole House should rejoice at the news. The deputy leader of the Social Democratic Party, David Owen, offered his congratulations and his condolences to the families of those who lost their lives. Thatcher had requested the attendance of the Permanent Under-Secretary of State for Foreign Affairs, civil servant Antony Acland, and he had rushed to the chamber from a dinner at the Spanish embassy. He watched the statement from the Officials' Box alongside Admiral Terence Lewin and Cabinet Secretary Robert Armstrong.

After the responses to the statement were concluded, Foot stated that some business remained scheduled for the day but that he thought the House should now adjourn. The Conservative leader of the House, John Biffen, dissented and requested that a motion relating to public health in Scotland be allowed to proceed. Labour MPs Christopher Price and Bruce Millan also spoke regarding the adjournment, suggesting that the House was in favour of it. The Speaker indicated he would adjourn but allowed a half-hour discussion on the paper industry to proceed, with the business being concluded at 11:51 pm.

Upon leaving the House, Thatcher returned to her official residence at Downing Street, where she mingled with a crowd of supporters singing "Rule, Britannia!". At this point, she stated to reporters, "we knew what we had to do and we went about it and did it. Great Britain is great again."

== Subsequent events ==
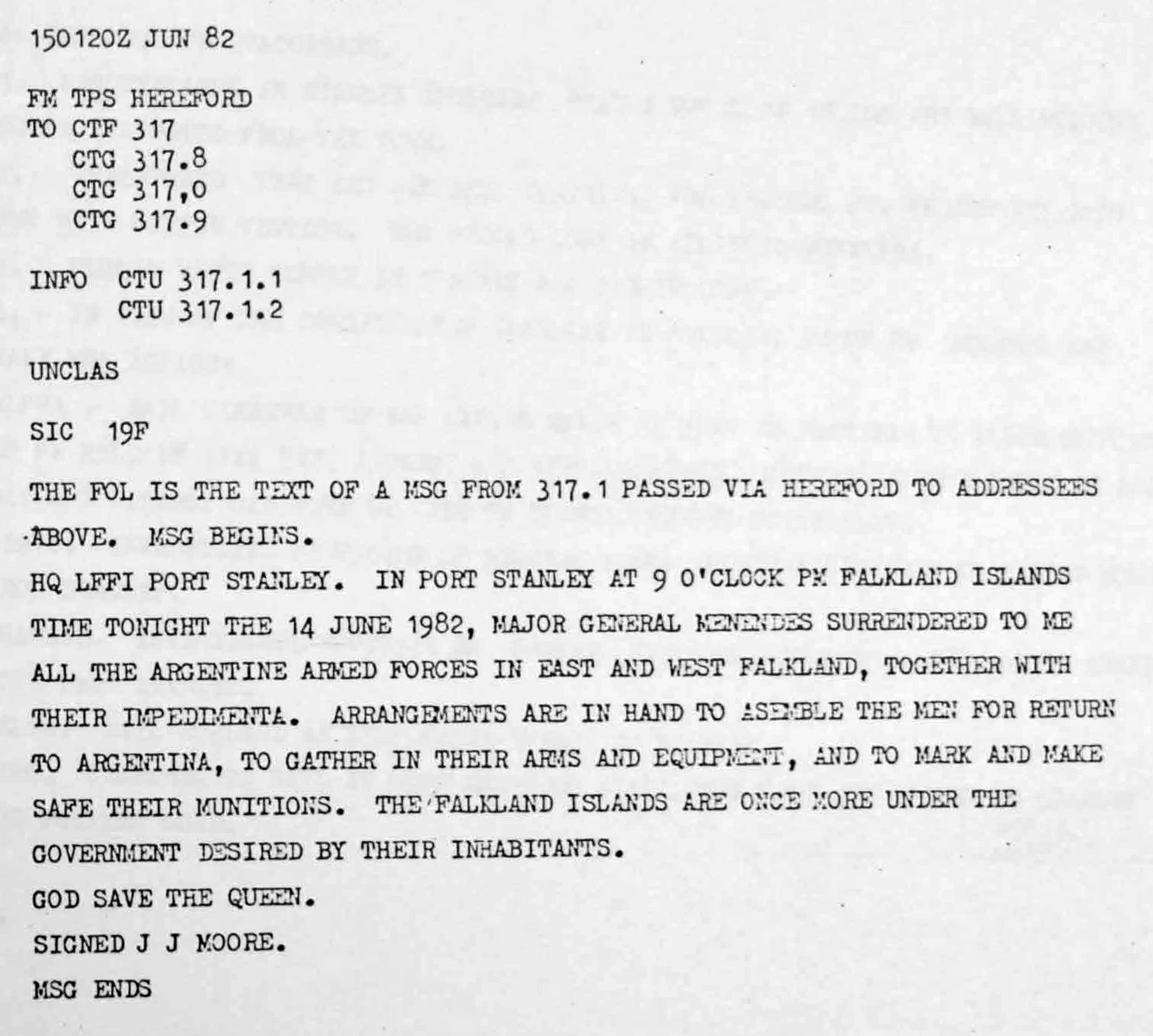
Telegram of 01:20 Zulu time (2.20 am BST) of 15 June notifying London of the Argentine surrender

In the Falklands, a ceasefire came into effect after it became clear to the Argentine command that there was nothing to be gained from continuing the fight. General Moore entered Port Stanley at 9:30 pm on 14 June (1.30 am on 15 June in BST) to sign the official Argentine surrender. The surrender was backdated to 8:59 pm (12:59 am BST) so that in the military's Zulu time (23:59) it had the same date of 14 June, to avoid confusion. British forces occupied Port Stanley on the morning of 15 June and disarmed the Argentine troops. The liberation of Thule in the South Sandwich Islands, which had been occupied by Argentina in the years leading up to the war, was completed by 20 June. The approximately 11,000 Argentine prisoners taken during the war were repatriated to Argentina by 14 July. The victory revived Thatcher's domestic popularity and was a key factor in her 1983 election win. Thatcher later stated that her Commons statement of 14 June was "perhaps the proudest moment of my life".
