= Colleen LaRose =

American supporter of terrorism

- Born: Colleen Renée LaRose; June 5, 1963 (age 63); Michigan, United States
- Other names: Jihad Jane, Fatima LaRose
- Parent(s): Richard LaRose; Cecil Wilkinson (stepfather)
- Status: Pleaded guilty to all charges on February 1, 2011. Released in November 2018.
- Motive: Jihad
- Conviction: terrorism-related charges
- Criminal charge: 1) conspiracy to provide material support to terrorists; 2) conspiracy to kill a person in a foreign country; 3) making false statements to the FBI; and 4) attempted identity theft (unsealed March 9, 2010)
- Penalty: 10 years

Colleen Renée LaRose (born June 5, 1963), also known as Jihad Jane and Fatima LaRose, is an American citizen who was convicted and sentenced to 10 years for terrorism-related crimes, including conspiracy to commit murder and providing material support to terrorists.

She had married at age 16 and never finished high school. After a quick divorce, she later married again at age 24, and divorced after a decade. She had moved from Texas in 2004 to live in Pennsburg, Pennsylvania. After personal losses and attempting suicide in 2005, she converted to Islam.

She was prosecuted in the United States District Court for the Eastern District of Pennsylvania.

LaRose was taken into custody in October 2009, and her arrest was made public on March 9, 2010, after seven alleged co-conspirators were arrested in Ireland (five of whom were later released by the Irish authorities). Among those arrested in Ireland (later released by the Irish authorities, but then arrested by U.S. authorities and charged as a co-defendant with LaRose in a superseding indictment) was Jamie Paulin Ramirez, an American woman from Colorado, whose parents say she was recruited by LaRose. Specifically, LaRose was charged with trying to recruit Islamic terrorists to wage violent Jihad and of plotting to murder the Swedish artist Lars Vilks, who had drawn a cartoon of the Islamic prophet, Muhammad.

She was arraigned and initially pleaded not guilty on March 18, 2010. She faced a maximum penalty of life in prison, and a $1-million fine. On February 1, 2011, she pleaded guilty to all charges against her. She was convicted on January 6, 2014, and sentenced to 10 years. She was released from prison on November 2, 2018.

== Background ==
LaRose was born in Michigan and grew up in Detroit. She has one sister, Pamela, who is three years older. Their parents divorced when Colleen was 3. She was raped by her biological father from about age 7 to age 13, when she ran away and became a prostitute.

LaRose was briefly married at the age of 16 to Sheldon Barnum, who was 32 at the time. A miscarriage left her unable to have children. Eventually, she moved to Texas. LaRose later married Rodolfo "Rudy" Cavazos in 1988, when she was 24 years old; the marriage ended in divorce ten years later in 1998.

LaRose moved to the Philadelphia area in 2004 to live with her new boyfriend, Kurt Gorman, whom she had met in Ennis, Texas, when he was on a business trip. She helped him care for his aging father.

Spurred by the deaths in short order of her brother and father, LaRose apparently attempted suicide on May 21, 2005, by consuming eight to ten cyclobenzaprine pills along with alcohol. Her sister Pam in Texas had been worried about her and called 911 to alert police. LaRose told responding police that she did not want to die. She lived with Gorman for about five years. During that period, she apparently converted to Islam and became radicalized, however, Gorman said that she "never talked about international events, about Muslims, anything".

=== Conversion to Islam ===
Her interest in Islam was sparked by a Muslim man she met in a bar in Amsterdam. After returning to Pennsylvania she began reading Muslim websites and signed up at a Muslim dating site. She learned the basics of Islam from a mentor in Turkey and converted "via instant messenger". "I was finally where I belonged," she recalled. She took the Muslim name Fatima. She became fixated with YouTube videos of attacks on Muslims by Israel and America. She posted copies of what appear to be attacks on U.S. troops in Iraq. Her Myspace profile featured messages such as "Palestine We Are With You" and "Sympathize With Gaza". In her profile, she said she is a recent convert to Islam. Her Myspace profile also reportedly included a post that read: "I support all the Mujahideen [Muslim warriors] I hate zionist & all that support them!"

On June 20, 2008, she posted a comment to the YouTube account "JihadJane" (account has since been suspended), saying that she was "desperate to do something somehow to help" suffering Muslims, according to authorities. She sent emails expressing her desire to become a martyr.

One of her co-conspirators allegedly identified Lars Vilks as a target; the Swedish artist who had outraged some Muslims by drawing a cartoon of Muhammad. LaRose was directed, on March 22, 2009, to go to Sweden, to find and kill Vilks to frighten "the whole Kufar [non-believer] world". According to her indictment, she responded in writing: "I will make this my goal till I achieve it or die trying".

On July 1, LaRose allegedly posted an online solicitation for funds to support terrorism. The FBI contacted her and interviewed her on July 17, 2009, and she denied soliciting funds for terrorism, or using the online screen name of "JihadJane." Fearing the FBI might know more she immediately booked a flight to Europe.

On August 23, 2009, LaRose stole Gorman's passport and flew to Western Europe. Prosecutors say the purpose of the trip was "to live and train with jihadists, and to find and kill" Vilks. She joined an online community hosted by Vilks on September 8. On September 30, she allegedly told an online co-conspirator that it would be "an honor & great pleasure to die or kill" for him, and promising that "only death will stop me here that I am so close to the target!" To a close friend she confessed, "When our brothers defend our faith [and] their homes, they are terrorist. Fine, then I am a terrorist and proud of this."

During her time in Europe, she reportedly traveled in London, the Netherlands, and, for approximately two weeks, in Ireland. In Europe, she first met Muslims in person; they were extremists who were devout and committed to the cause. They taught her to pray, and she was fully accepted as a Muslim. She had begun to become disillusioned when family illness back in America led her to "pause" and return home.

== Arrest, indictment, and arraignment ==
LaRose was arrested on October 16, 2009, in Philadelphia. In a court appearance before a federal magistrate on October 17, she agreed to pretrial detention, but did not enter a plea. She was kept in custody in Philadelphia without bail until her indictment was unsealed, to protect another investigation.

LaRose's indictment charged that along with five unindicted co-conspirators (in South Asia, Eastern Europe, Western Europe, and the U.S.), she used the Internet to communicate with potential jihadists outside the U.S., conspired to commit murder, and financed terrorism.

Among those involved in the plot was Mohammad Hassan Khalid, a fifteen-year-old Pakistani immigrant living with Asperger syndrome; Khalid, the youngest person ever to be prosecuted for terrorism offences in the US, eventually joined the Quilliam Foundation to fight radicalization. LaRose was charged with conspiracy to provide material support to terrorists, conspiracy to kill in a foreign country, making false statements to the FBI, and attempted identity theft. Swedish authorities said they were aware of the arrest before it happened.

LaRose was arraigned on March 18, 2010, and pleaded not guilty to all four counts. United States magistrate judge Lynne Sitarski set her trial date for May 3, 2010; during the interim she remained in federal custody. If convicted, she faced a maximum penalty of life in prison, and a $1-million fine. On February 1, 2011, LaRose changed her plea to all charges. She was confined to her cell often for 23 hours a day but managed to become engaged to a fellow prisoner who promised to convert to Islam upon release. They met through "talking on the bowls", prison slang for scooping out toilet cell bowl water, calling and listening through the plumbing pipes.

=== Arrests in Ireland ===
The same day as the unsealing of LaRose's indictment, four men and three women in their 20s and 40s were arrested in Waterford and Cork, Ireland, in connection with an alleged plot to assassinate Vilks. Irish police said most of those arrested were foreign residents of the country.

They reportedly included three Algerians (two of them a married couple), a Croatian Muslim convert, a Palestinian, a Libyan, and a U.S. national—Jamie Paulin Ramirez. Five of the people were released in early March 2010, while Ali Charaf Damache, a 10-year Algerian resident of Ireland, and the Libyan, Abdul Salam al-Jahani, were ordered held without bail.

LaRose spoke online about her plans with at least one of the suspects apprehended in Ireland, according to a U.S. official. Her main contact in Ireland was believed to be Damache, who lived in Waterford with Ramirez. Gardaí believe LaRose may have visited Ireland to contact the suspects in 2009.

LaRose was the only American woman in recent years to have been charged in the U.S. with similar terrorist violations. Some terrorism experts pointed to LaRose's apparent mental instability, arguing she was an anomaly and not representative of a trend towards women jihadists.

== See also ==
- Domestic terrorism
- Samantha Lewthwaite
- José Padilla
