= Black Flag =

Black Flag or black flag may refer to:

== Flags ==
- The Black Standard, a legendary flag in Islamic tradition
- The Anarchist black flag
- The Jolly Roger, flag associated with piracy
- The Pan-African flag, a trans-national unity symbol
- Black flag (racing)
- Black flag disqualification, type of starting penalty in sailing

== Arts, entertainment, and media ==
- Black Flag (band), an American hardcore punk band
- Black Flag (comics), a comic book superhero team from Maximum Press
- Black Flag (Ektomorf album), a 2012 album by Ektomorf
- Black Flag (Machine Gun Kelly mixtape), 2013
- "Black Flag" (song), a 1992 song by King's X
- BLACK FLAG FREESTYLE, a song by Denzel Curry and That Mexican OT from King of the Mischievous South Vol. 2
- Black Flag (newspaper), a publication in Britain
- Assassin's Creed IV: Black Flag, 2013 videogame by Ubisoft
- Black Flags: The Rise of ISIS, a 2015 Pulitzer prize-winning book by Joby Warrick

== Places ==
- Black Flag, Western Australia, an abandoned town named after the Black Flag gold mine and farm

== Other uses ==
- Ali Charaf Damache, a terror suspect with the nom de guerre "the Black Flag"
- Black Flag (insecticide)
- Black Flag Army, a militia in Vietnam and southern China, 1860s-1885
- Chernoe Znamia, a 20th-century Russian anarchist organisation
- Ferraria crispa, a plant also known as black flag
- Waving the Black flag, a euphemism for no quarter
