= Ali Charaf Damache =

- Born: August 21, 1965 (age 61); Algeria
- Arrested: 2015; Spain
- Citizenship: Algeria, Ireland
- Other names: Black Flag; The Black Flag
- Spouse: French wife (name unknown); Mary Cronin (m. 2002); Jamie Paulin Ramirez (m. 2009)

Ali Charaf Damache (born 21 August 1965) is a citizen of Algeria and Ireland who was the first suspected terrorist to be extradited to the US during the first Donald Trump presidency. He was alleged to have been the ringleader of a cell tasked with killing Lars Vilks, a Swedish artist some Muslims accused of blasphemy for having drawn the Islamic prophet Muhammad in a cartoon.

Although he was born in Algeria, he grew up in France.

In 2009, Damache married Jamie Paulin Ramirez, an American convert to Islam he met online, through a dating site for American Muslims. Ramirez would go by the nickname "Jihad Jamie", and would eventually receive an 8-year sentence for playing a role in the plot to kill Vilks. Ramirez and Colleen LaRose, another American convert to Islam, traveled to Ireland to participate in the murder plot. Ramirez and Damache wed the day she arrived in Ireland. Both Ramirez and LaRose were blonde, with blue eyes. Commentators would assert that Damache and his colleagues sought out blonde-haired, blue-eyed converts because, once radicalized, they would find it easy to cross borders without suspicion.

Law enforcement officials in Ireland arrested Damache and six other individuals, in Ireland, in 2010, after learning of the plot against Vilks. LaRose, who went by the nickname "Jihad Jane", is reported to have tipped off authorities herself, after she grew disenchanted with Damache. While he had impressed her, online, she was disappointed after meeting him in person, and seeing he had trouble paying his bills.

LaRose returned to the US, where she pled guilty and received a ten-year sentence. Damache was only charged with sending a threatening text message. Damache was arrested by the Irish police pursuant to an extradition request from the United States but was released by an Irish court.

Spain arrested Damache, in December 2015, at the request of the US. The US had charged Damache with trying to recruit others to terrorism, and leading the cell that included LaRose. The US announced they had received Damache on July 21, 2017.

In 2018, Damache pleaded guilty to terrorism offences and received a 15-year jail sentence. He was notified by the Minister for Justice of Ireland of the intention to revoke his Irish citizenship, but he appealed this in the Irish courts. In October 2020 he won his appeal on the grounds of the unconstitutionality of the relevant section of the Irish citizenship act.
