= Blue flag =

Blue flag or Blue Flag may refer to:

Sport and recreation

- Blue Flag beach, a beach or marina that meets certain quality standards
- Blue Flag, the flag of Chelsea F.C.
- Blue flag, a particular Flag#Swimming flags
- Blue flag, a particular Racing flags#Blue flag

Botany

- Larger Blue Flag or Iris versicolor, a type of iris
- Slender Blue Flag or Iris prismatica, a type of iris

Transport

- Blue flag, a particular Flag#Railway flags in railway use.
- Blue sign used by European waterways vessels passing on the starboard side

Military

- Blue Flag (Israeli Air Force exercise), the name of an Israeli Air Force exercise
- Blue Flag (United States Air Force exercise), the name of a United States Air Force command and control exercise

Other

- Blue Flag (manga), a manga series by Kaito.
- "The Blue Flag", World War I song composed by Carrie Jacobs-Bond
- Blue Flag, common representation of the street gang Crips
- A political flag used to represent conservatism

== See also ==
- Bonnie Blue Flag
