= Fremont Bank =

Retail and commercial bank in California

- Type: Private
- Industry: Banking
- Founded: 1964
- Headquarters: Fremont, California
- Key people: Andrew Mastorakis, President & CEO
- Revenue: $17,600,000
- Number of employees: 500+
- Website: www.fremontbank.com

Fremont Bank is a retail and commercial bank and California mortgage lender. Founded in 1964, Fremont Bank is one of the oldest independent family-owned and managed banks in the state. It has 20 branches across the counties of Alameda, Contra Costa, Santa Clara, San Francisco and Monterey with retail loan offices in Sacramento and Los Angeles counties.

== History ==
Fremont Bank was founded in 1964 by Morris Hyman, a World War II veteran who came to the Bay Area with his family in 1945. Morris died in October 2005. His three children now manage Fremont Bank.

In 1968, Fremont Bank launched one of the first iterations of Saturday banking. In the late 1980s, Fremont Bank developed the “No Closing Cost” Loan Program which reduced the borrowers' costs of refinancing their mortgage with fees refunded at closing. These fees were a direct result of changes in mortgage lending practices that involved title insurance policies, appraisals, escrow services, and other changes that affected mortgage lending. The "No Closing Cost" loan was charged at a slightly higher rate and sold in the secondary market at a price high enough to cover the closing costs and bank overhead while generating a profit for the bank.

== Community efforts ==
The ’’Fremont Bank Foundation’’ (FBF) was established in 1995 under the direction of Fremont Bank's late founder, Morris Hyman, and his late wife, Alvirda. FBF is an independent, private, grant making foundation that is solely funded by Fremont Bank. Formed with an initial investment of $20,000, the Foundation now receives a significant percentage of Fremont Bank's pre-tax income each year. These funds allow Fremont Bank to fund local nonprofit organizations. Their greatest contribution to date has been $3,800,000 for a new critical care facility at Washington Hospital in Fremont.
