= Overwatch (military tactic) =

Military tactic

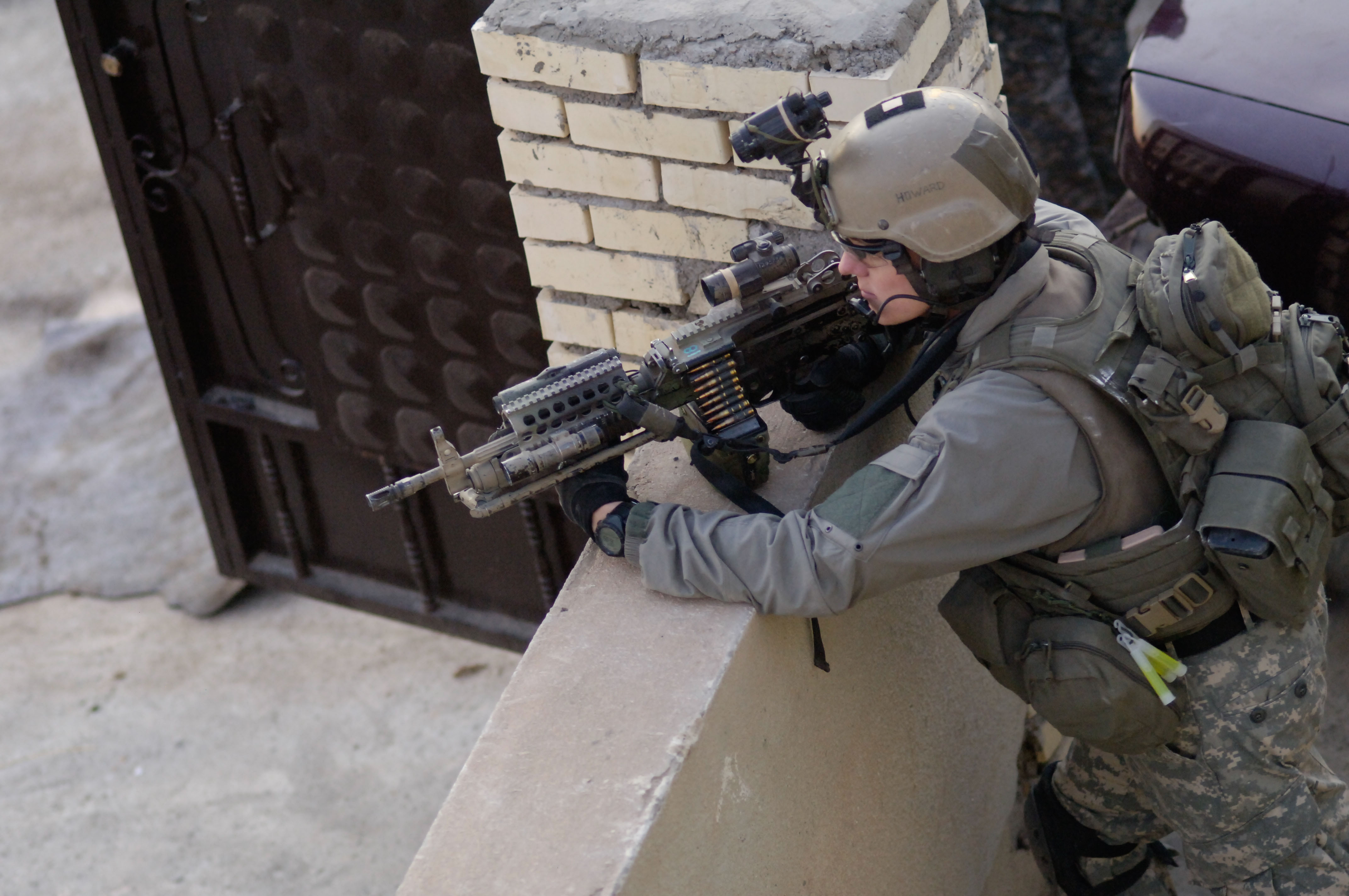
A U.S. Army Ranger armed with an M249 light machine gun provides overwatch security on an objective during a mission in Iraq, 2006

Overwatch is a force protection tactic in modern warfare where one small military unit, vehicle, or aircraft supports another friendly unit while the latter executes fire and movement tactics. The term was coined in U.S. military doctrine in the 1950s.

An overwatching unit typically takes a vantage position (usually a high ground or tall structure with good defilade) where it can observe the terrain far ahead, especially likely enemy positions and movements. This allows it to act as a warning system against hostile aggression and provide effective covering fire for advancing friendly units.

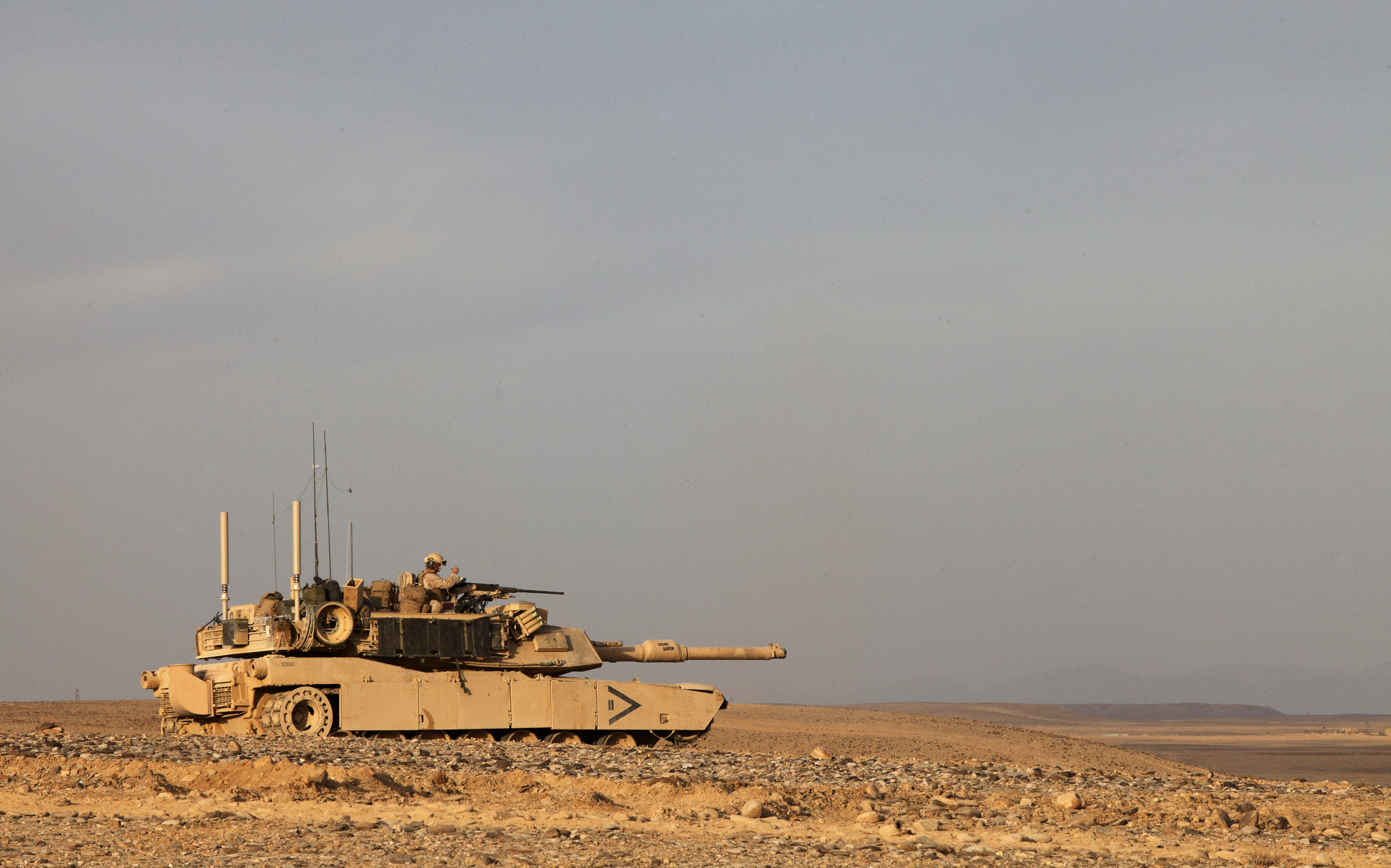
A U.S. Marine Corps M1A1 Abrams tank assigned to Delta Company, 1st Tank Battalion, provides overwatch security in support of Operation Dynamic Partnership in Shurakay, Helmand province, Afghanistan, Feb. 12, 2013.

== See also ==
- List of established military terms
- Combined arms
- Bounding overwatch
