= Blue sign =

Flag displayed by vessels when passing

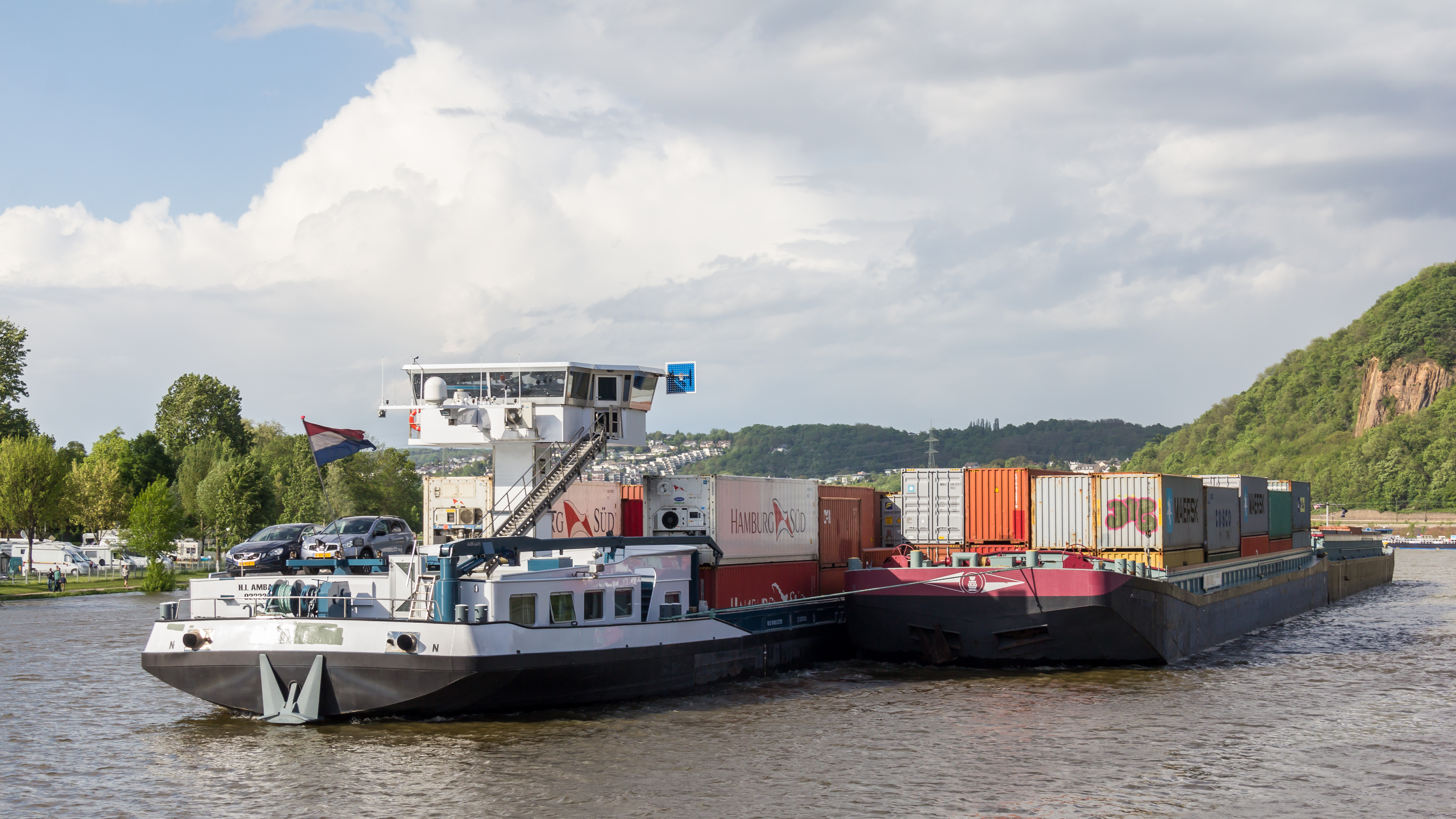
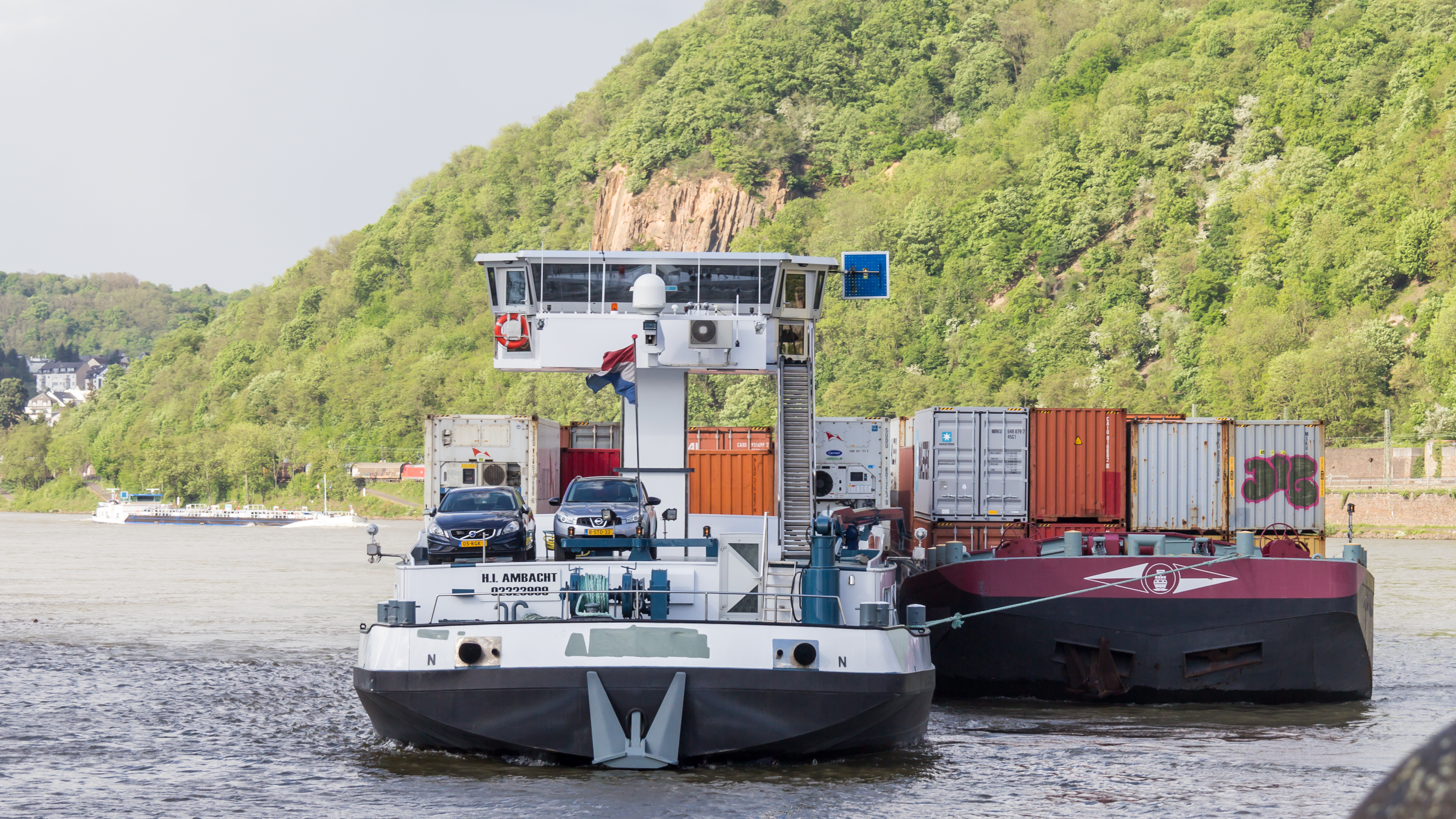
Blue sign activated, during starboard passing

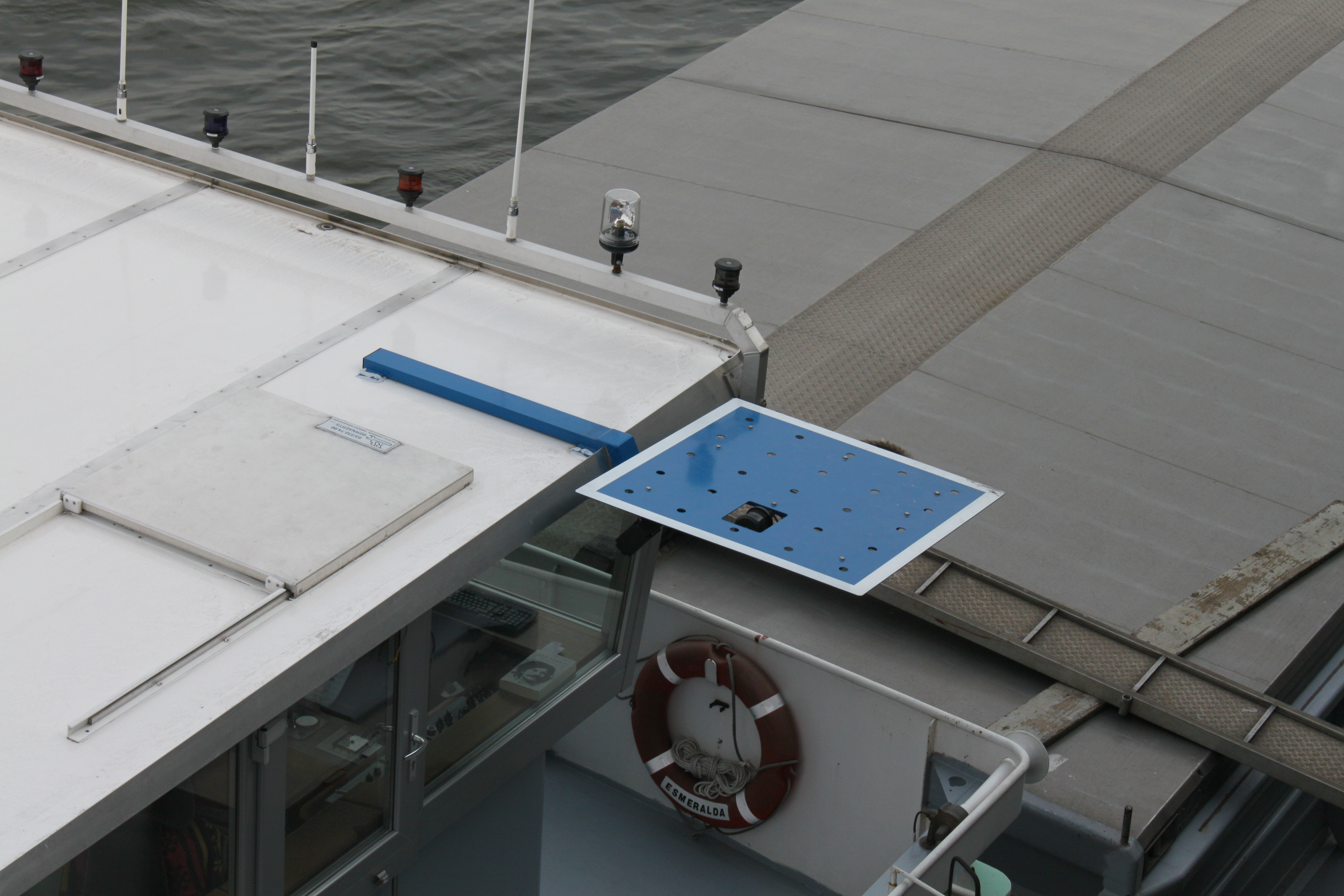
Rotating-style blue sign laying flat when not active. There is a 5 cm white border and the light is in the centre

A blue sign or blue board is used by inland waterways vessels within the Trans-European Inland Waterway network when performing a special manoeuvre or passing on the starboard side. On navigable waterways vessels normally pass each other on the port-side, so the display of the blue sign and flashing white light signal intention to pass each other on the starboard-side. This process is known as blue boarding or historically blue flagging.

The Code Européen des Voies de la Navigation Intérieure (CEVNI) regulations require upstream vessels operating on the opposite side to display a light-blue sign and scintillating (flashing) white light. Article 3.03 states that the board must be rectangular and 1-metre × 1-metre for large vessels, or 0.6-metres × 0.6-metres for small vessels.

The presence and status of the blue sign is transmitted by the ship's Inland-Automatic Identification System (Inland-AIS) transponder to other vessels. The status of the sign is transmitted using two bits of the "regional application flags"/"special manoeuvre field" in the AIS position reports. This must be transmitted every ten seconds.
