= Suppressive fire =

Weapons fire that degrades the performance of an enemy force

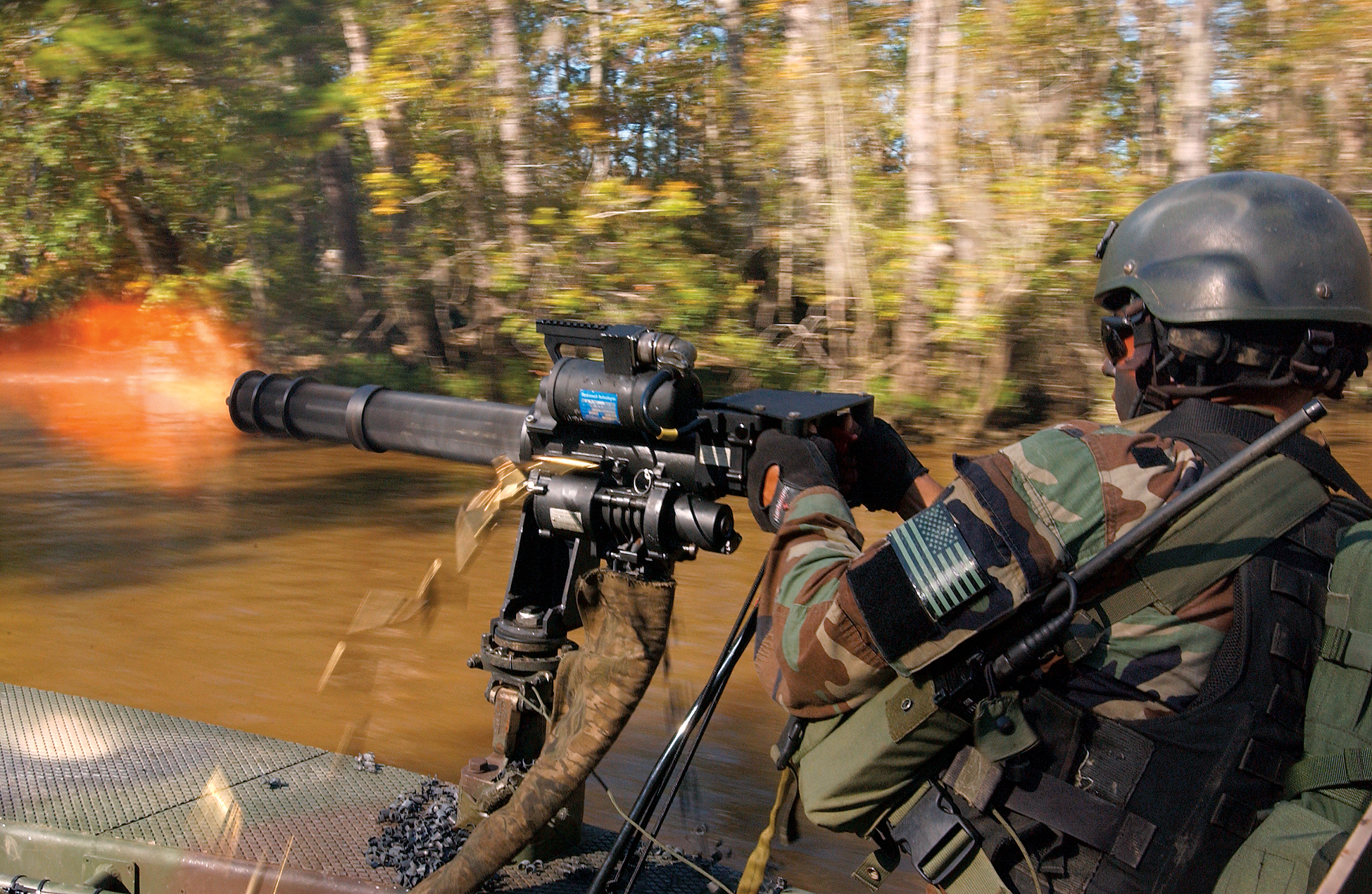
A Special Warfare Combat Crewman laying down suppressive fire with an M134 Minigun during a training exercise

Suppressive fire is a military tactic used to indirectly and temporarily immobilize an enemy by applying continuous firepower on the enemy's position. In military science, and according to the definition of the North Atlantic Treaty Organisation (NATO), suppression fire is: "Fire that degrades the performance of a target below the level needed to fulfil its mission." When used to protect exposed friendly troops advancing on the battlefield, it is commonly called covering fire. It is one of three types of fire support, which is defined by NATO as "the application of fire, coordinated with the maneuver of forces, to destroy, neutralise or suppress the enemy."

Before NATO defined the term, the British and Commonwealth armies generally used "neutralisation" with the same definition as suppression. NATO now defines neutralisation as "fire delivered to render a target temporarily ineffective or unusable."

== Usage ==
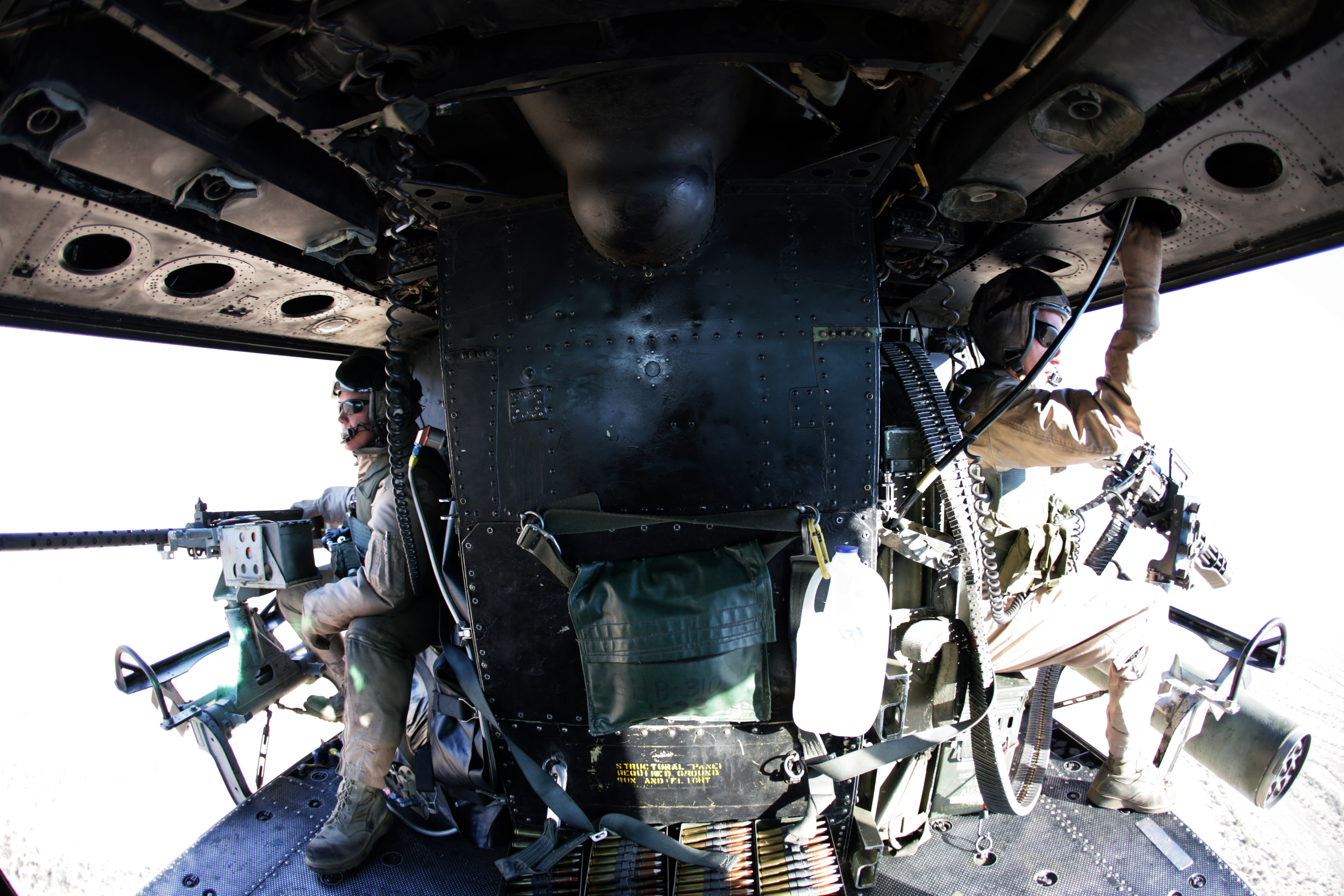
Two US Navy crew chiefs look over the horizon with their .50-cal machine gun and Minigun. Door gunners use machine guns to provide suppressive fire when the helicopter has to land in a hostile area.

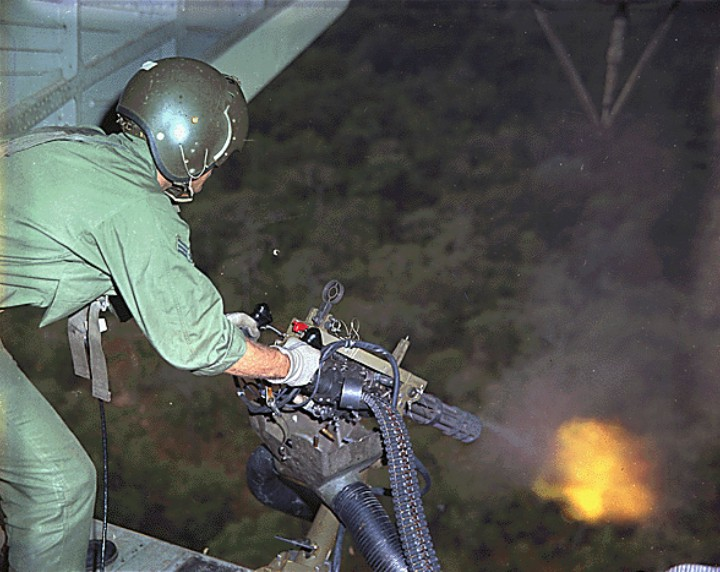
A rotating-barrel minigun being fired from a gunship in Vietnam during the war.

Suppressive fire usually achieves its effect by threatening casualties to individuals who expose themselves to it, forcing them into inactivity and ineffectiveness by the necessity of staying behind cover. Suppression may be more or less effective depending on the morale, motivation, and leadership of the target troops to act during ongoing suppressive fire. Non-lethal suppression is another possible approach, such as using smoke to "blind" enemy observation, or using illuminating flares at night to suppress enemy activities by denying them the cover of darkness.

Suppressive fire is often used as covering fire, defined by NATO as: "Fire used to protect troops when they are within range of enemy small arms." This is sometimes called "winning the firefight" in an infantry-only action. However, suppressive fire may also be used against indirect firers, enemy air defenses, or other military activities such as construction work or logistic activities, or to deny an area to the enemy for a short period of time. Suppression fire is unsuitable for prolonged area denial due to ammunition supply constraints.

Suppression can be delivered by any weapon or group of weapons capable of sustaining the required intensity of fire for the required period of suppression. Suppressive fire capabilities vary widely because the suppressive effect area varies widely. For example, a rifle or machine gun bullet may only have a suppressive effect within about one metre of its trajectory, whereas a single artillery shell may suppress a few thousand square metres around its burst. Furthermore, sustained suppression over more than a few minutes may be difficult to achieve with small arms fire for logistic reasons: air delivered suppression is similarly affected by payload limits. In contrast, artillery can suppress an area for an extended period.

The purpose of suppression is to stop or prevent the enemy from observing, shooting, moving, or carrying out other military tasks that interfere (or could interfere) with the activities of friendly forces. An important feature of suppressive fire is that it is usually only effective while it lasts, and while it has sufficient intensity.

Suppressive fire is a tactic to reduce casualties to friendly forces and enable them to conduct their immediate mission. For example, a suppressed target will be unable to engage vulnerable forces that are moving without cover. This enables forces to advance to new positions or close with the enemy. For example, a United States Marine Corps article notes that "communication and suppressive fire are what enables movement on the battlefield, giving Marines the upper hand." Suppressive fire may be used to enable a helicopter or boat to land, or to extract soldiers from a battle zone (the latter is called a "hot extraction").

Suppressive fire is typically used as covering fire against the enemy in the close combat zone. However, suppressive fire delivered by artillery and other methods of indirect fire can be used to suppress targets of any type, most notably as counter-battery fire against indirect fire units. NATO also defines "suppression of enemy air defenses" (SEAD), which has a broader definition and includes materiel damage. An important consideration in the application of suppressive fire from indirect fire systems (e.g. mortars, artillery and ships) and aircraft is the safety of the attacking troops. Fragmenting munitions are indiscriminate and potentially lethal in all directions around the point of burst although the pattern and extent of the lethal area depends on several variable factors, some specific to each situation.

The primary intended effect of suppressive fire is psychological. Rather than directly trying to kill enemy soldiers, it makes the enemy soldiers feel unable to safely perform any actions other than seeking cover. Colloquially, this goal is expressed as "it makes them keep their heads down" or "it keeps them pinned down". However, depending on factors including the type of ammunition and the target's protection, suppressive fire may cause casualties and/or damage to enemy equipment.

Suppressive fire requires sufficient intensity over the target area, intensity being the suppressive effect per unit of target area per unit of suppression time. Weapons vary widely in their suppressive capabilities, which are the threat signaled by the noise of projectiles in flight and their impact.

In modern warfare, overwatch is a force protection tactic: the state of one small unit or military vehicle supporting another unit, while they are executing fire and movement tactics. An overwatching, or supporting unit has taken a position where it can observe the terrain ahead, especially likely enemy positions. This allows it to provide effective covering fire for advancing friendly units. An ideal overwatch position provides cover for the unit, and unobstructed lines of fire. It may be on a height of ground or at the top of a ridge, where a vehicle may be able to adopt a hull-down position. If the overwatching unit is in a position to fire over advancing friendly units, great care must be taken not to let fire fall short. The friendly units should be within tracer burnout (the range at which tracer rounds are visible).

== History ==
During the Battle of Pavia of 1525, faced against the French heavy cavalry, Fernando d'Ávalos implemented the technique of using his Spanish and Italian arquebusiers to cover the advance of his light cavalry with a continuous fire from sheltered positions. This model, which upgraded with firearms the tactics used by the English archers in the Battle of Falkirk in 1298, was adopted by King Gustavus Adolphus of Sweden in the 17th century.

World War I marked a steep change because of the development of artillery techniques and the protection provided by trenches. By late 1915, the British Expeditionary Force realised that the effects of artillery fire could not smash an opening in German trench lines or reliably destroy enemy artillery at critical times. They therefore developed artillery techniques to suppress the enemy in trenches to allow their infantry to approach them and to suppress the enemy artillery at critical stages to protect attacking infantry. Thereafter, suppression became the defining British artillery tactic, although it had been first used in the Boer Wars. A moving barrage could suppress a line of front providing covering fire for an attack several miles wide. Shrapnel was the usual ammunition used by the British Army in its barrages. Suppressive fire was used against enemy artillery that attacked the assaulting troops with indirect fire.

Infantry minor tactics also evolved and suppression became a key element in 'winning the fire fight'. This was greatly facilitated by the increase in the availability of machine guns, from before World War I and later. However, suppression by infantry direct fire weapons is generally only tactically useful against targets that do not have mutual support from adjacent positions and ammunition stocks may only be available for several minutes of sustained firing.

In World War II amphibious assaults, naval warships would open fire with their main armaments at known or suspected enemy artillery, mortar, or machine gun positions, on or behind the landing beaches, to suppress enemy fire from these positions which could be directed against the landing troops. The rise of mass usage of aircraft and aerial assaults also gave rise to bombing runs and strafing runs, serving as oft-used means of suppressing enemy forces, disrupting enemy lines, and inflicting heavy damage on the enemy all at once, using concentrated fire from machine guns and/or carried-on explosives to pin down entire swathes of territory. Firebombs were also used for suppression, area denial, and extensive psychological effect. The Vietnam War and the commonplace implementation of napalm furthered this concept.

== Weapons used ==
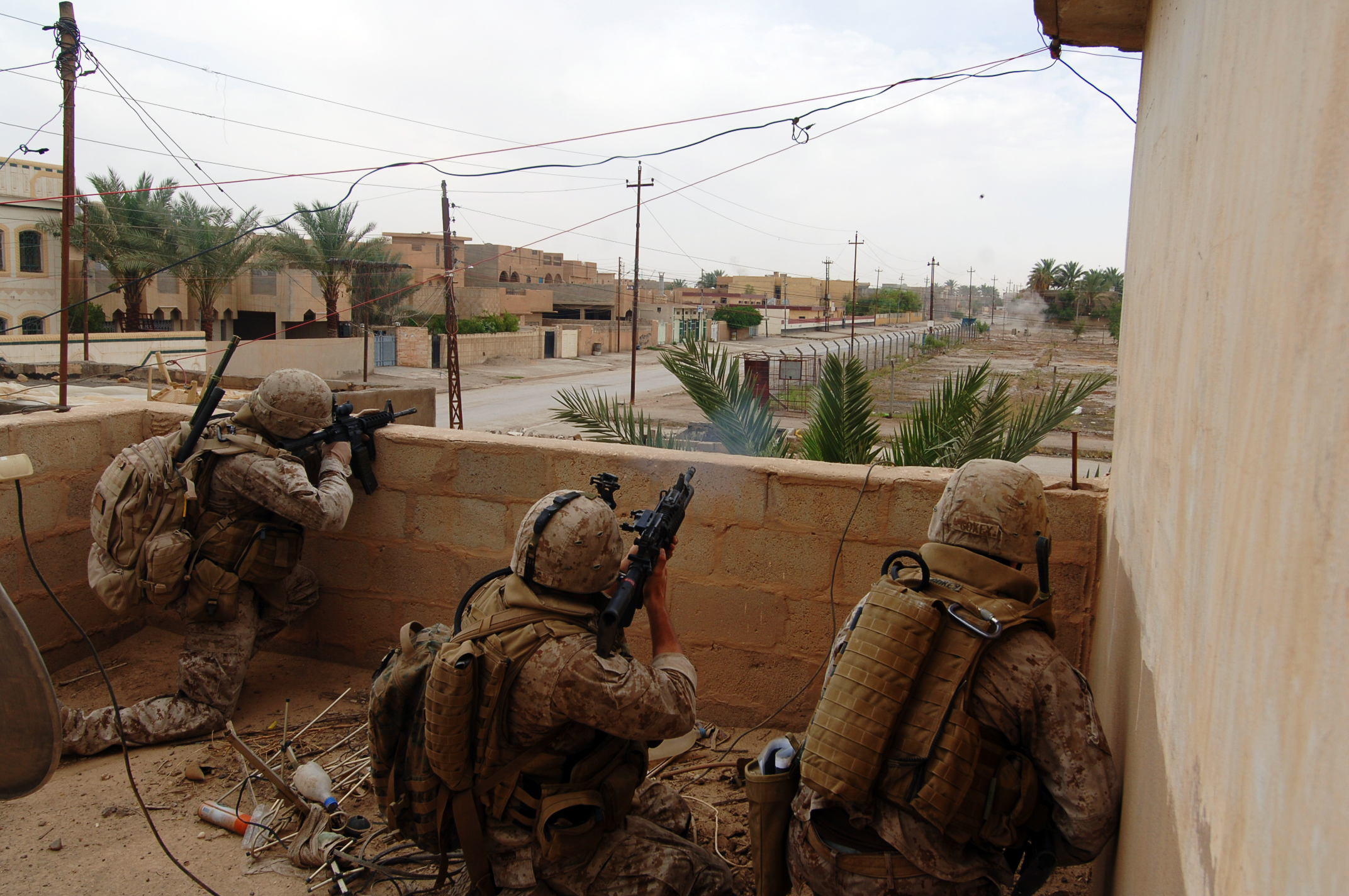
Two US Marines providing covering fire with a M4 carbine and a 40 mm M203 grenade launcher while a Marine from Air Naval Gunfire Liaison Company spots targets in Ramadi, Iraq, 2006.

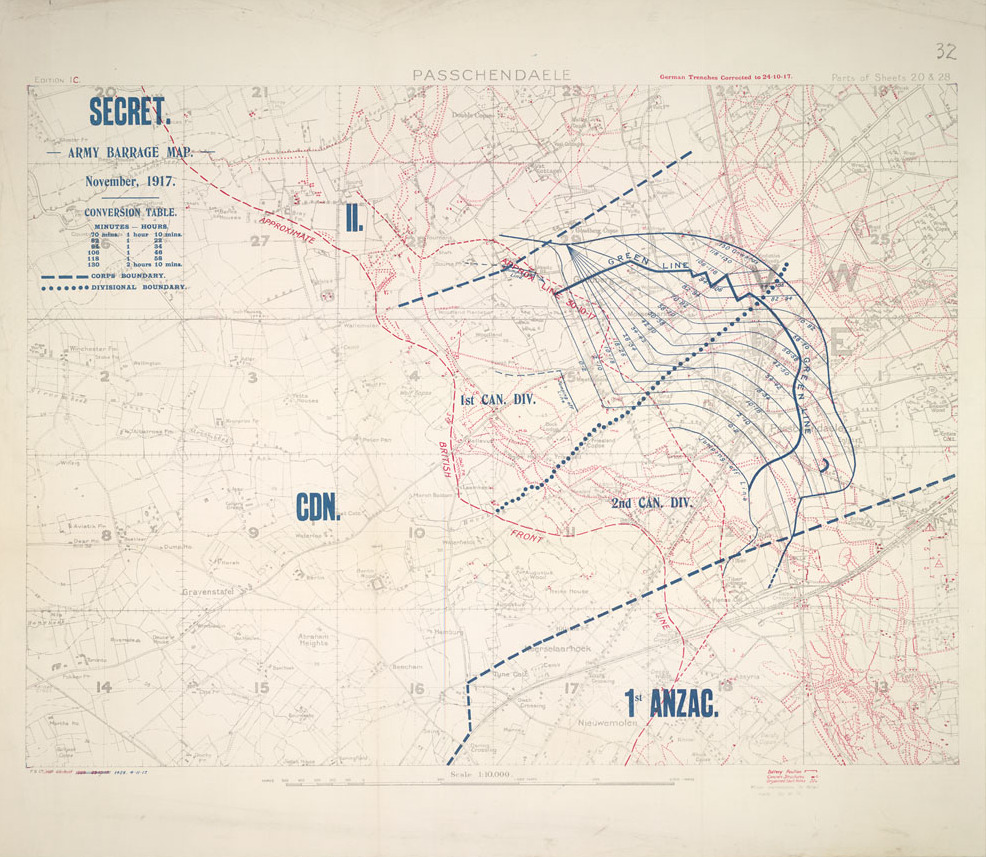
Map of artillery barrages during the Second Battle of Passchendaele (1917) showing the creeping fire to protect an advance.

Suppressive fire can be delivered by any weapon or group of weapons capable of delivering the required intensity for the required period of suppression. Suppressive fire may be direct or indirect. However, suppressive fire capabilities of different weapons vary, most notably in the size of the area of their suppressive effect.

=== Indirect fire weapons ===
There are several variations for applying artillery (and mortar and naval gun) fire for suppressive effect. In World War I a moving barrage was the normal method; shrapnel shells were fired to place their bullet cone ahead of the advancing infantry with their aimpoints moved 100 yard further forward every few minutes on a front of several kilometres to support an attack by several divisions or corps. High Explosive (HE) barrages were also used in World War II, including to cover the advance of tanks by suppressing anti-tank gunners.

However, HE concentrations against specific targets became more common and gradually replaced the barrage. With a concentration the fire starts when attacking forces become vulnerable to the target and lifts off the target when the attacking forces reach an agreed distance from it. The suppressive effect lingers for a short period, about 2 minutes, after the artillery fire stops.

A suppressive concentration by a single battery can suppress a position of around 250x250 metres and may be used to support a platoon or company attack on a single or succession of objectives. For larger operations many batteries may be involved against many targets and move their fire to different targets as the operation progresses.

While HE is most used for suppression, smoke screens can also be used to suppress by obscuring the enemy's view, this is effective against an enemy with direct fire weapons. Modern smoke is impenetrable to modern thermal imaging sights. In peace support operations, illuminating with parachute flares has been used to thwart activities by a warring party.

For artillery batteries, the last-ditch mission that a forward observer can call up is "immediate suppression". This orders every gun in any concerned battery to immediately fire whatever round and fuse is loaded, possibly from someone else's, or more than one callsign's mission. The FO may end up getting white phosphorus illumination, DPICM, and VT-HE rounds on the target in the same shot.

=== Direct fire weapons ===
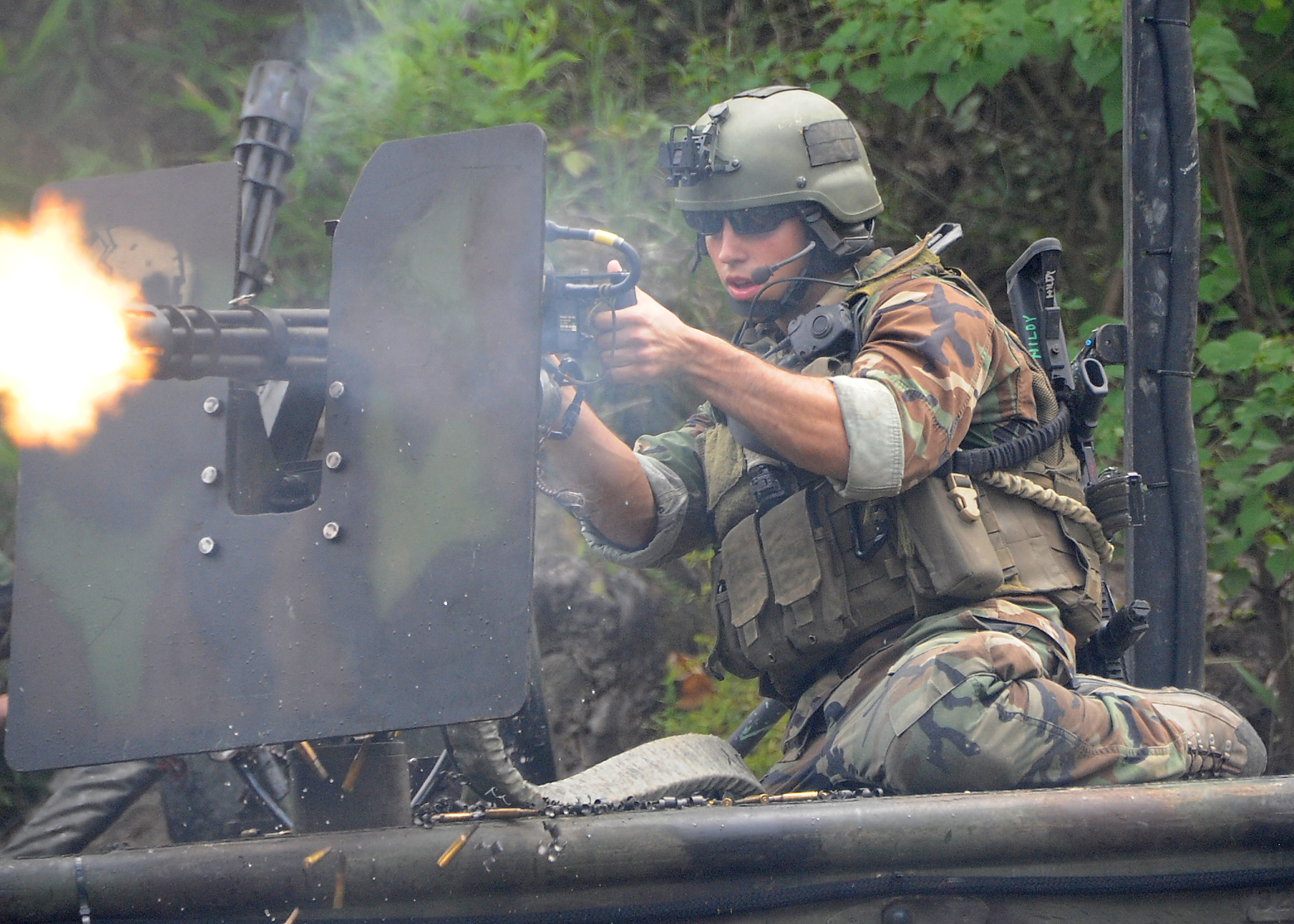
U.S. Navy special warfare combatant-craft crewman (SWCC) of Special Boat Team 22 conducts training.

A rifle or machine gun bullet only has a suppressive effect within about one metre of its trajectory. However, both can be used to suppress an enemy within a small area, often called "winning the fire fight".

Machine gun fire is also available from armoured fighting vehicles and aircraft, notably helicopters and perhaps fixed wing aircraft such as AC-130. Automatic cannon (20–40 mm) or grenade fire may also be available and fire from larger direct fire systems such as tanks. However, limited ammunition loads mean that such systems are better suited to destructive fire against precisely identified targets unless the required suppression time period is short.

In Afghanistan, the Mujahideen often modified RPG-7 rocket launchers for use against Russian helicopters by adding a curved pipe to the end of the blast tube, which diverted the backblast, allowing the RPG to be fired upward at aircraft from a prone position. At the time, Soviet helicopters countered the threat from RPGs at landing zones by first clearing them with saturation anti-personnel suppression fire from machine guns.

The Russians used the Dragunov sniper rifle at the platoon level for providing special long-distance disrupting and suppressive fire on the battlefield, even with sudden close encounters with enemy troops in mind.

== See also ==
- Harassing fire
