= List of military tactics =

This article contains a list of military tactics.

The meaning of the phrase is context sensitive, and has varied over time, such as the difference between "strategy" and "tactics".

== General ==
- Exploiting prevailing weather – the tactical use of weather as a force multiplier has influenced many important battles throughout history, such as the Battle of Waterloo.
- Fire attacks – reconnaissance by fire is used by apprehensive soldiers when they suspect the enemy is nearby.
- Force concentration – the practice of concentrating a military force against a portion of an enemy force.
- Night combat – combat that takes place at night. It often requires more preparation than combat during daylight and can provide significant tactical advantages and disadvantages to both the attacker and defender.
- Reconnaissance – a mission to obtain information by visual observation or other detection methods, about the activities and resources of the enemy or potential enemy, or about the meteorologic, hydrographic, or geographic characteristics of a particular area.
- Smoke screening – the practice of creating clouds of smoke positioned to provide concealment, allowing military forces to advance or retreat across open terrain without coming under direct fire from the enemy.

== Eight classic maneuvers of warfare ==
1. Penetration of the center: This involves exploiting a gap in the enemy line to drive directly to the enemy's command or base. Two ways of accomplishing this are separating enemy forces then using a reserve to exploit the gap (e.g., Battle of Chaeronea (338 BC)) or having fast, elite forces smash at a weak spot (or an area where your elites are at their best in striking power) and using reserves to hold the line while the elite forces continue forward, exploiting the gap immediately (i.e., blitzkrieg).
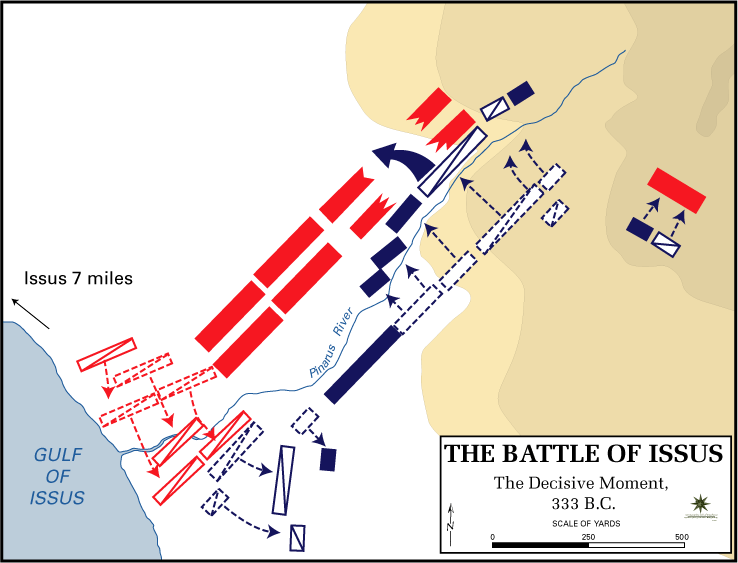
  Battle of Issus, a classic example of the single envelopment
2. Attack from a defensive position: Establishing a strong defensive position from which to defend and attack your opponent (e.g., Siege of Alesia and the Battle of Stalingrad). However, the defensive can become too passive and result in ultimate defeat.
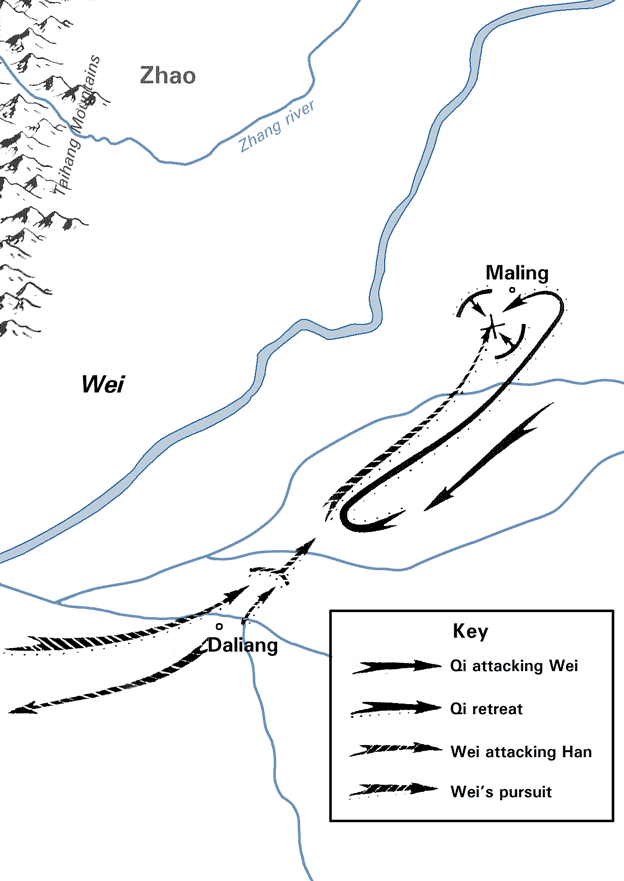
  Battle of Maling, the earliest known use of the feigned retreat
3. Single envelopment: A consolidated prong (flank) beating its opponent opposite end, and with the aid of holding attacks, attack an opponent in the rear. Sometimes, the establishment of a strong, hidden force behind a weak flank will prevent your opponent from carrying out their own single envelopment. (e.g., Battle of Rocroi).
4. Double envelopment: Both flanks defeat their opponent opposite and launch a rear attack on the enemy center. Its most famous use was Hannibal's tactical masterpiece, the Battle of Cannae, and it was frequently used by the Wehrmacht on the Eastern Front of World War II. It was also executed to perfection by Khalid ibn al-Walid in the decisive Battle of Yarmuk in 636 AD.
5. Attack in oblique order: This involves placing your flanks in a slanted fashion (refusing one's flank) or giving a vast part of your force to a single flank (e.g., Battle of Leuthen). The latter can be disastrous, however, due to the imbalance of force.
6. Feigned retreat: Having a frontal force fake a retreat, drawing the opponent in pursuit and then launching an assault with strong force held in reserve (such as the Battle of Maling and the Battle of Hastings).
7. Indirect approach: Having a minority of your force demonstrate in front of your opponent while the majority of your force advance from a hidden area and attack the enemy in the rear or flank (e.g., Battle of Chancellorsville).
8. Crossing the "T": A classic naval maneuver in which a line of warships crosses in front of a line of enemy ships, allowing the crossing force to bring all its broadside guns to bear while the enemy can only return fire with their forward guns (such as at the Battle of Tsushima). However, the maneuver can be countered by breaking through the opposing line at a perpendicular angle to divide and defeat the fleet in detail, as seen at the Battle of Trafalgar.

== Tactics ==
=== Deception ===
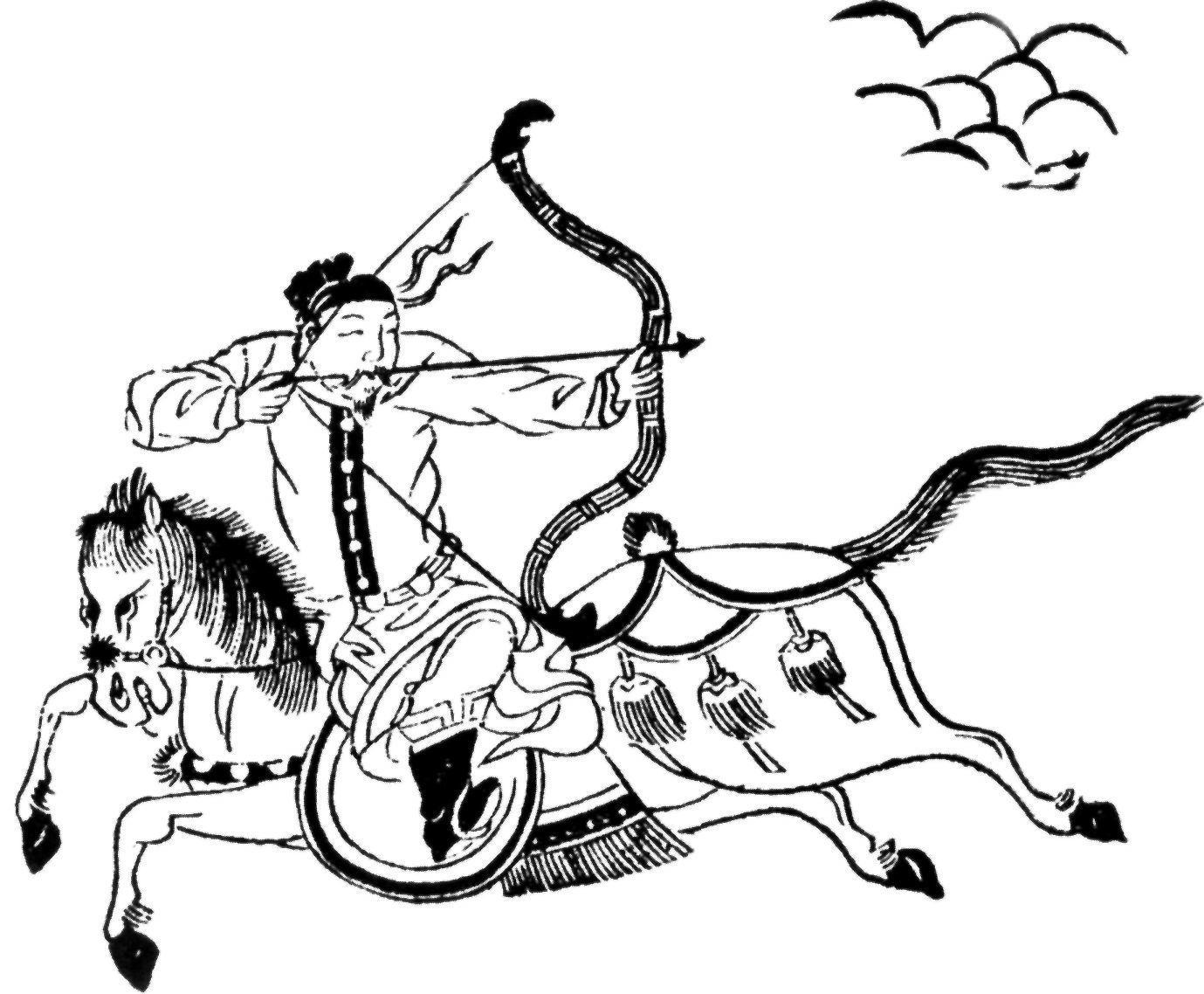
A mounted archer of the Ming Dynasty Army fires a parthian shot

In the 4th century BCE, Sun Tzu said "the Military is a Tao of deception". Diversionary attacks, feints, decoys; there are thousands of tricks that have been successfully used in warfare, and still have a role in the modern day.

- Perfidy: Combatants tend to have assumptions and ideas of rules and fair practices in combat. Those who raise surrender flags to lure their attackers in the open, or who act as stretcher bearers to deceive their targets, tend to get especially disliked.
- False flag: An ancient ruse de guerre – in the days of sail, it was permissible for a warship to fly the flag of an enemy power, so long as it properly hoisted its true colors before attacking. Wearing enemy uniforms and using enemy equipment to infiltrate or achieve surprise is also permissible though they can be punished as spies if caught behind enemy lines.
- Demoralization (warfare): A process in psychological warfare that can encourage them to retreat, surrender, or defect by deterioration of the opposite force's morale rather than defeating them in a regular warfare.
- Disinformation
- Military camouflage
- Stealth technology
- Feint
- Electronic countermeasures
  - Electronic counter-countermeasures
  - Radio silence – while traveling, a fleet will refrain from communicating by radio to avoid detection by enemy forces
  - Holding attack

=== Defensive ===
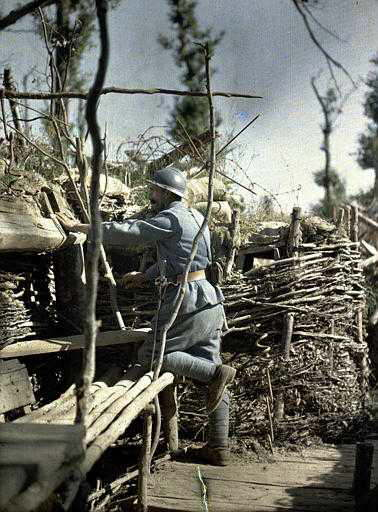
Defensive trenches were used commonly during World War I

- Basic principles
  - Mutual support (e.g., by crossfire)
  - Echelon formation
  - All round defence
  - Force dispersal
- Fighting withdrawal
  - Booby traps
- Counter attack
  - Counter battery fire
  - Rapid reaction force
- Delaying defence
  - Break contact
- Hedgehog defence
  - military bottleneck
- Pakfront
- Fortification
  - Field works (entrenchments)
    - Over head protection
    - Revetting
    - Shell scrapes
    - Defensive fighting position
- Use and improvement of terrain
  - Use of the High ground
  - Protection
  - Natural barriers – e.g., rivers
  - Reverse slope defence
  - Obstacles and barriers – man made
    - Barbed wire
    - Anti-vehicle ditches
    - Anti-vehicle berms (knife edges)
- Multiple axis of movement

Electronic countermeasures

=== Offensive ===
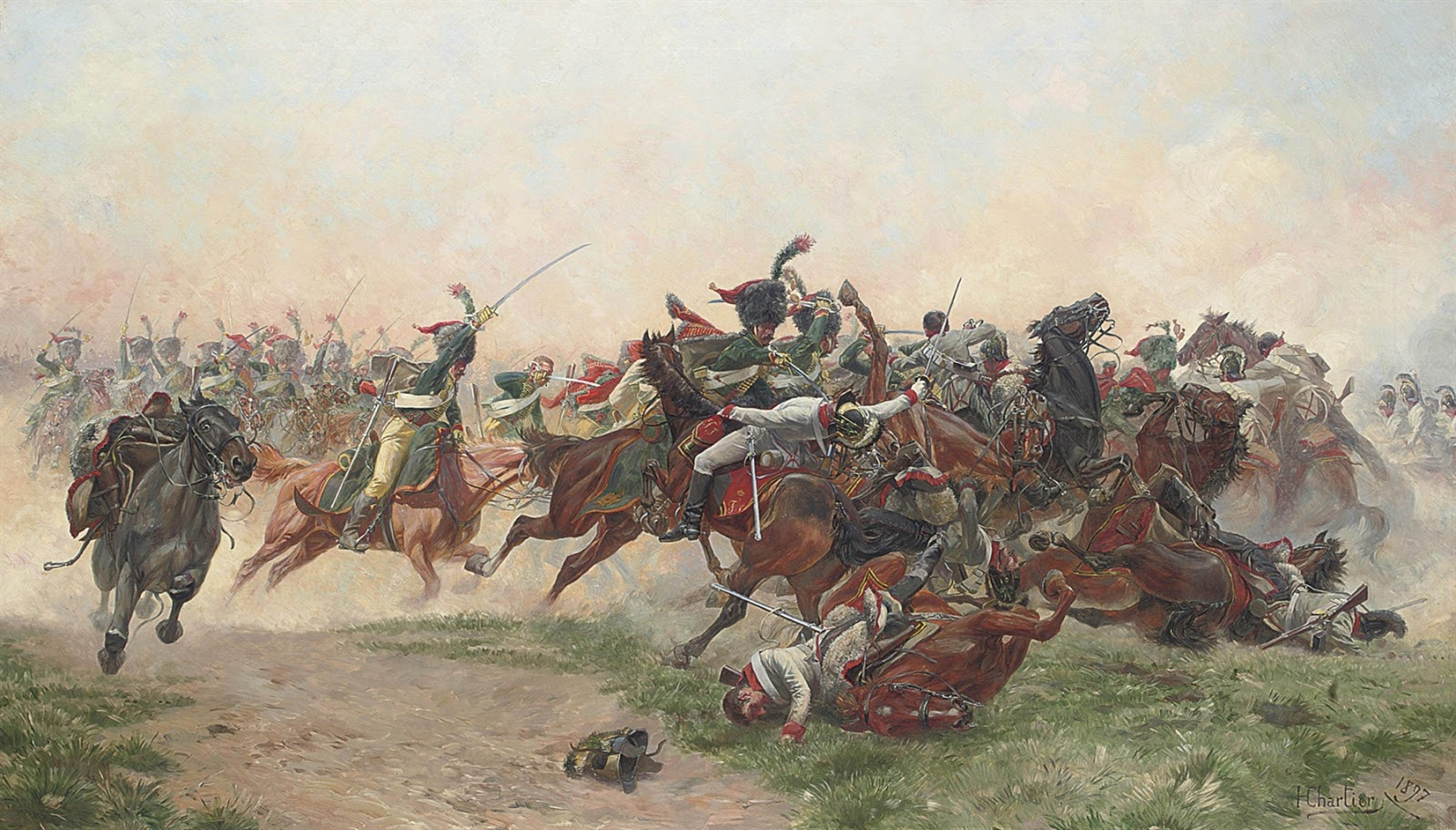
The cavalry charge is a quintessential offensive military tactic

- Use of a Kill zone
- Ambush
- Skirmish
- Trench raiding
- Peaceful penetration
- Rapid dominance
  - Blitzkrieg – a method of warfare whereby an attacking force is spearheaded by a dense concentration of armoured and motorized or mechanized infantry formations, and heavily backed up by close air support.
  - Carpet bombing – also known as saturation bombing, is a large aerial bombing done in a progressive manner to inflict damage in every part of a selected area of land.
  - Shock tactics
  - Swarming
- Planned attack
  - Use of supporting fire
  - Flying wedge (used by Alexander the Great)
  - Armoured spearhead
  - Encirclement
  - Hammer and anvil
  - Frontal assault
  - Human Wave Attack
  - Penetration or infiltration
  - Pincer movement – an army assaults an enemy by attacking two sides at opposite locations, often planning to cut off the enemy from retreat or additional support in preparation for annihilation.
  - Bull horn formation – an army assaults an enemy force by sending troops to the enemy's flanks and by attacking their front attacking three areas at once, often planning to cut off any retreat or support as well as confusing the enemy in preparation for annihilation.
  - Flanking maneuver
  - Defeat in detail
- Interdiction – severing or disrupting lines of communication and supply
  - Air interdiction
- Control MSR (main supply routes)
- Envelopment
  - Circumvallation
  - Siege (For attacking fortified places)
    - Mouse-holing
  - Vertical envelopment
    - Airborne forces
    - Air mobile forces
- Rapid deployment
  - Capturing key points
  - Airborne operations
  - Air mobile operations
  - Amphibious operations
  - Motorized operations
  - Tank desant
  - Mechanized operations
  - Armored operations
  - Raiding – a small team is inserted deep behind enemy lines to capture a high-value individual or destroy a vital enemy installation then extracted before the enemy can respond.
- Exhausting - sending in small teams of soldiers to wear out the enemy each day and then strike with all of your forces.
- Disrupting communications
  - Radar jamming
  - Radio jamming

=== Small unit ===
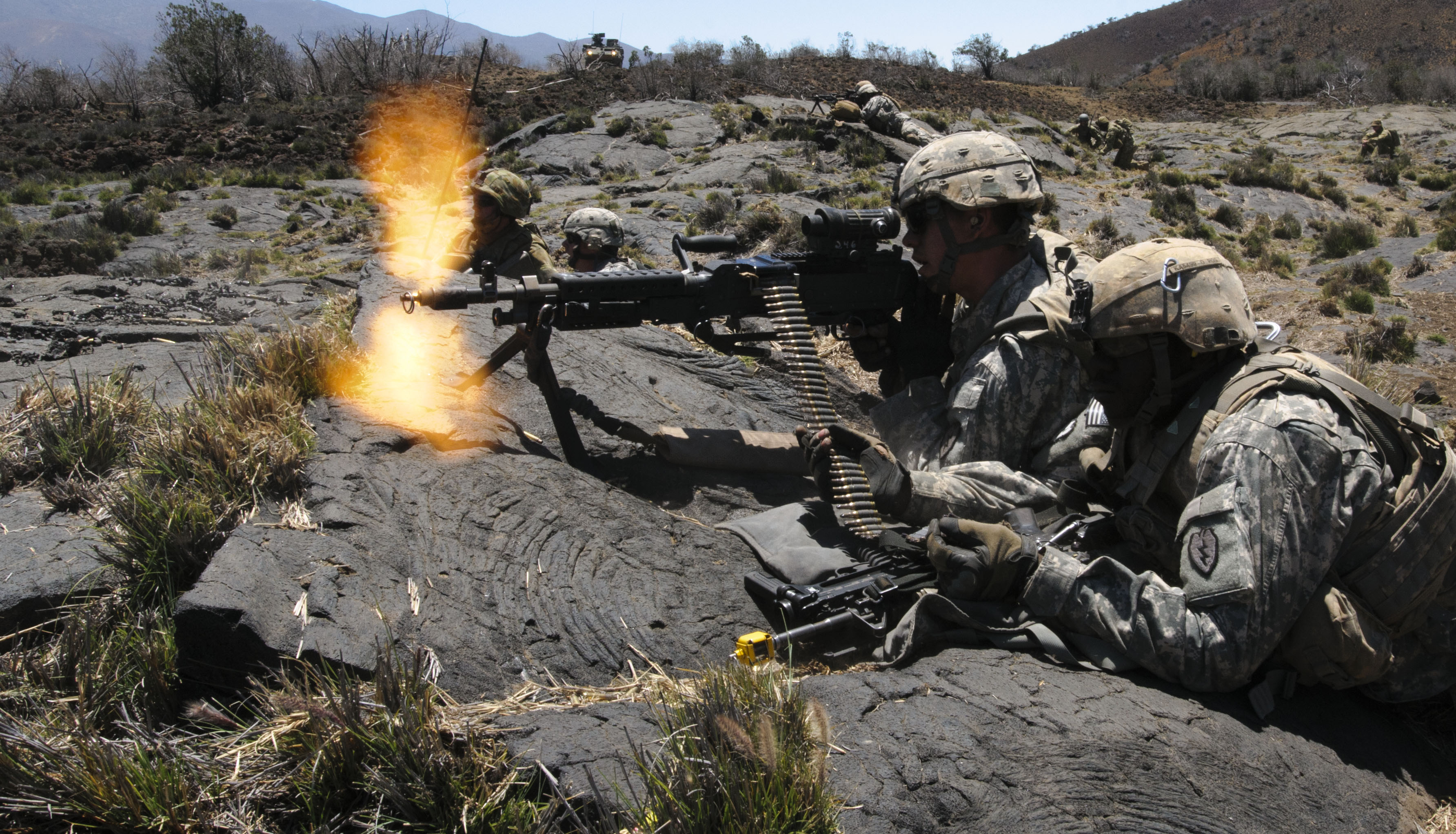
The use of suppressive fire is a key part of modern small unit tactics

- Individual movement techniques
  - Fire and movement (also known as leapfrogging) – working in 'fire teams', one team attempts to suppress the enemy while the other moves either toward the enemy or to a more favourable position.
  - Basic drill – a standard drill that all individual soldiers are supposed to perform if they come under fire.
  - Contact drill
  - Immediate ambush drill
  - Counter ambush drill
- Hull-down (in armored warfare)
- Shoot-and-scoot
- Infiltration tactics
- Marching fire
  - Four Fs: find, fix, flank, finish
  - Overwatch
    - Bounding overwatch
  - Center peel
- Patrolling
  - Reconnaissance patrol
  - Fighting patrol
  - Standing patrol (OP/LP)
- Ambush
  - Linear ambush
  - L ambush
  - Area ambush
- Guerrilla
  - Sniper trap – A sniper trap (colloquial term in US military “Chechen rat trap”) is a tactic used by snipers in which the sniper intentionally shoots to wound instead of kill an enemy combatant, with the end goal of drawing more enemy personnel into the field of fire so the sniper can fire on them as they provide aid to their wounded comrade. Not only does this tactic provide more targets for the sniper as enemy personnel come to help the wounded, but it also causes the sniper’s enemy to expend more resources in recovering, evacuating, and treating the wounded combatant than would be expended if the sniper simply killed the enemy combatant.

== See also ==
- List of established military terms
- List of military operations
- List of military strategies and concepts
- Military strategy
- Tactical formation
