= Infantry tactics =

Foot-soldier combat methods

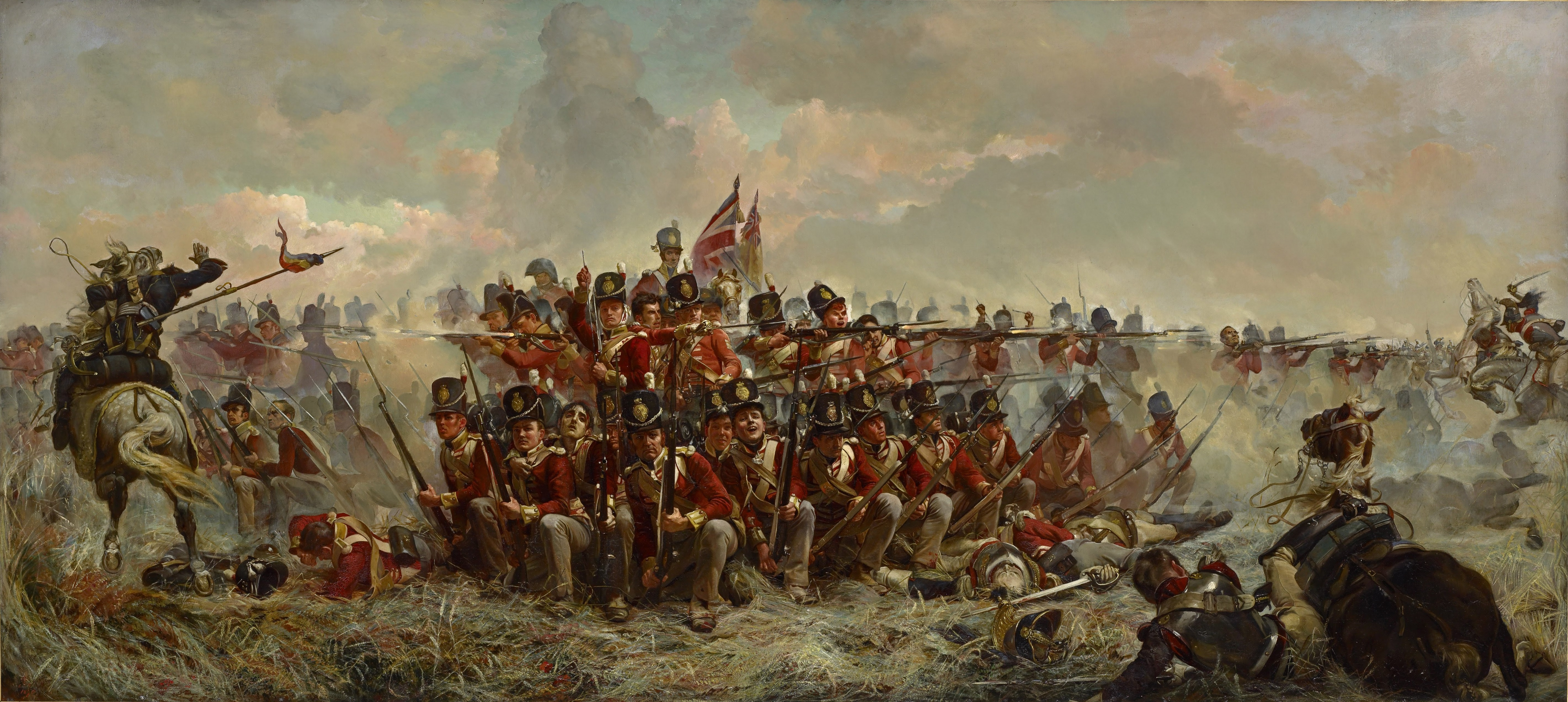
Soldiers of the 28th Regiment of Foot of the British Army, employing square formation tactics to fend off attacks of French cavalry, at the Battle of Quatre Bras, 16 June 1815

Infantry tactics are the combination of military concepts and methods used by infantry to achieve tactical objectives during combat. The role of the infantry on the battlefield is, typically, to close with and engage the enemy, and hold territorial objectives; infantry tactics are the means by which this is achieved. Infantry commonly makes up the largest proportion of an army's fighting strength, and consequently often suffers the heaviest casualties. Throughout history, infantrymen have sought to minimise their losses in both attack and defence through effective tactics. (For a wider view of battle and theater tactics see: Military strategy)

Infantry tactics are the oldest method of warfare and span all eras. In different periods, the prevailing technology of the day has had an important impact on infantry tactics. In the opposite direction, tactical methods can encourage the development of particular technologies. Similarly, as weapons and tactics evolve, so do the tactical formations employed, such as the Greek phalanx, the Spanish tercio, the Napoleonic column, or the British 'thin red line'. In different periods the numbers of troops deployed as a single unit can also vary widely, from thousands to a few dozen.

Modern infantry tactics vary with the type of infantry deployed. Armoured and mechanised infantry are moved and supported in action by vehicles, while others may operate amphibiously from ships, or as airborne troops inserted by helicopter, parachute or glider, whereas light infantry may operate mainly on foot. In recent years, peacekeeping operations in support of humanitarian relief efforts have become particularly important. Tactics also vary with terrain. Tactics in urban areas, jungles, mountains, deserts or arctic areas are all markedly different.

== Ancient history ==
The infantry phalanx was a Sumerian tactical formation as far back as the third millennium BC. It was a tightly knit group of hoplites, generally upper and middle-class men, typically eight to twelve ranks deep, armored in helmet, breastplate, and greaves, armed with two-to-three metre (6~9 foot) pikes and overlapping round shields. It was most effective in narrow areas, such as Thermopylae, or in large numbers. Although the early Greeks focused on the chariot, because of local geography, the phalanx was well developed in Greece and had superseded most cavalry tactics by the Greco-Persian Wars. In the fourth century BC Philip II of Macedon reorganized his army, with emphasis on phalanges, and the first scientific military research. Theban and Macedonian tactics were variations focused on a concentrated point to break through the enemy phalanx, following the shock of cavalry. Carefully organized—into tetrarchia of 64 men, taxiarchiae of two tetrarchiae, syntagmatae of two taxiarchiae, chilliarchiae of four syntagmatae, and phalanges of four chilliarchiae, with two chilliarchiae of peltasts and one chilliarchia each of psiloi and epihipparchy (cavalry) attached—and thoroughly trained, these proved exceedingly effective in the hands of Alexander III of Macedon.

However, as effective as the Greek phalanx was, it was inflexible. Rome made their army into a complex professional organization, with a developed leadership structure and a rank system. The Romans made it possible for small-unit commanders to receive rewards and medals for valor and advancement in battle. Another major advantage was a new tactical formation, the manipular legion (adopted around 300BC), which could operate independently to take advantage of gaps in an enemy line, as at the Battle of Pydna. Perhaps the most important innovation was improving the quality of training to a level not seen before. Although individual methods were used by earlier generations, the Romans were able to combine them into an overwhelmingly successful army, able to defeat any enemy for more than two centuries.

=== The Roman tactical system ===
On the infantry level, the Roman Army adapted new weapons: the pilum (a piercing javelin), the gladius (a short thrusting sword), and the scutum (a large convex shield) providing protection against most attacks without the inflexibility of the phalanx. Generally, battle would open with a volley of light pila from up to 18 m (20 yd) (and frequently far less), followed by a volley of heavy pila just before the clashing with scuta and gladii. Roman soldiers were trained to stab with these swords instead of slash, always keeping their shields in front of them, maintaining a tight shield-wall formation with their fellow soldiers. To motivate the Roman soldier to come within two metres (6 ft) of his enemy (as he was required to do with the gladius) he would be made a citizen after doing so, upon completion of his term of service. Roman infantry discipline was strict and training constant and repetitive.

The manipular legion was an improvement over the phalanx on which it was based, providing flexibility and responsiveness unequalled before that time. By increasing dispersal, triple that of a typical phalanx, the manipular legion had the unanticipated benefit of reducing the lethality of opposing weapons. Coupled with superb training and effective leaders, the Roman army was the finest in the world for centuries. The army's power on the field was such that its leaders avoided most fortifications, preferring to meet the enemy on open ground. To take an enemy-held fortification, the Roman army would cut off any supply lines, build watchtowers around the perimeter, set up catapults, and force the enemy to attempt to stop them from reducing the fortification's walls to rubble. The Roman army's achievements were carefully carved in stone on Trajan's Column, and are well documented by artifacts strewn about battlefields all over Europe.

== Middle Ages ==
After the fall of the Roman Empire, many of the ingenious tactics they used disappeared. Tribes such as the Visigoths and Vandals preferred to simply rush their enemies in a massive horde. These tribes would often win battles against more advanced enemies by achieving surprise and outnumbering their foes. Born out of the partition of the Roman Empire, the Byzantine Empire created an effective military. Its conscripts were well-paid and led by commanders educated in military tactics and history. However, the army mostly relied on cavalry, making the infantry a smaller portion of its overall force.

The Vikings were able to be effective against stronger enemies through surprise and mobility. Like guerrillas in other wars, the Vikings could decide when and where to attack. In part because of their flat bottomed ships, which enabled them to sneak deep into Europe by river before carrying out an attack, the Vikings could frequently catch their enemies by surprise. Monasteries were common targets because they were seldom heavily defended and often contained substantial amounts of valuables.

Battles of the Middle Ages were often smaller than those involving the Roman and Grecian armies of Antiquity. Armies (much like the states of the period) were more decentralized. There was little systematic organisation of supplies and equipment. Leaders were often incompetent; their positions of authority often based on birth, not ability. Most soldiers were much more loyal to their feudal lord than their state, and insubordination within armies was common. However, the biggest difference between previous wars and those of the Middle Ages was the use of heavy cavalry, particularly knights. Knights could often easily overrun infantry armed with swords, axes, and clubs. Infantry typically outnumbered knights somewhere between five and ten to one. They supported the knights and defended any loot the formation had. Infantry armed with spears could counter the threat posed by enemy cavalry. At other times pits, caltraps, wagons or sharpened wooden stakes would be used as protection from charging cavalry, while archers brought down the enemy horsemen with arrows; the English used stakes to defend against French knights at the Battle of Agincourt in 1415.

Pikemen often became a substitute for communities and villages who could not afford large forces of heavy cavalry. The pike could be up to 18 feet (5.5 m) long, whereas the spear was only 6 to 8 feet (2.4 m) in length. Archers would be integrated into these forces of spearmen or pikemen to rain down arrows upon an enemy while the spears or pikes held the enemy at bay. Polearms were improved again with the development of the halberd. The halberd could be the length of a spear, but with an axe head which enabled the user to stab or chop the enemy cavalry with either the front of the axe or a thin point on the opposite side. The Japanese also created polearms. The naginata consisted of an approximately 6-foot (1.8 m) long shaft and a 2.5-foot (0.76 m) blade. The naginata was often used by women to guard a castle in the absence of men.

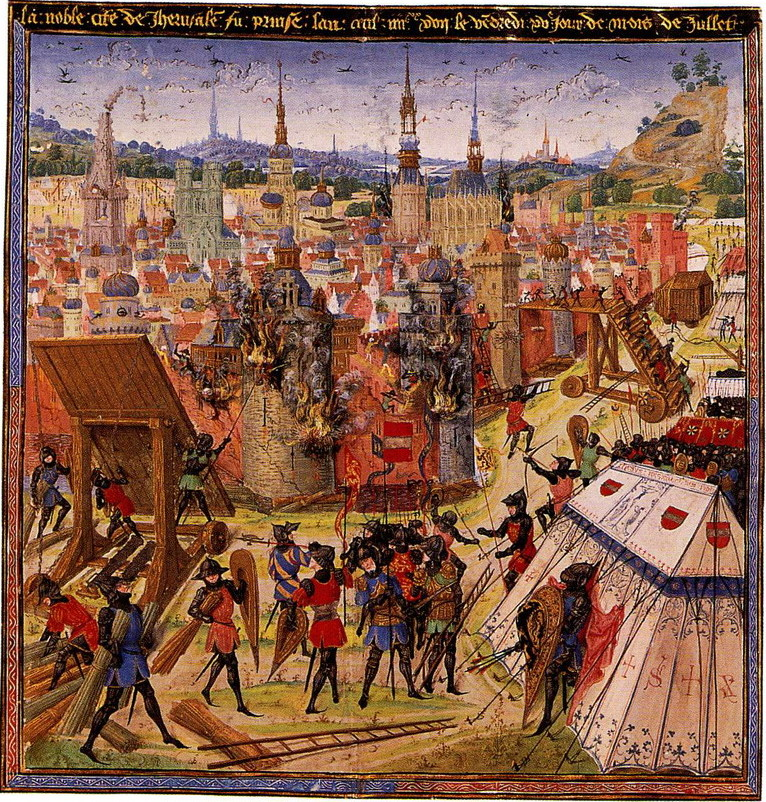
Infantry besieging Jerusalem during the First Crusade

The crossbow, which did not require trained archers, was frequently used in armies where the extensive training necessary for longbow was not practical. The biggest disadvantage of crossbows was the slow reloading time. With the advent of steel and mechanical drawing aids, crossbows became more powerful than ever. Armor proof against longbows and older crossbows could not stop quarrels from these improved weapons. Pope Innocent II put a ban on them, but the move toward using this lethal weapon had already started.

The first gunpowder weapons usually consisted of metal tubes tied down to wooden staves. Usually, these weapons could only be fired once. These gonnes, or hand cannons, were not very accurate, and would usually be fired from city walls or in ambush. Like the crossbow, the gonne did not require trained soldiers and could penetrate the armor worn by enemy soldiers. Ranged weapon users were protected by soldiers with melee weapons. Knights would be on either sides of this force and close in on the enemy to destroy them after they had been weakened by volleys. The introduction of firearms presaged a social revolution; even an illiterate peasant could kill a noble knight.

== Modern history ==
=== Early modern period ===
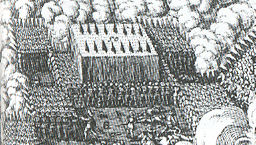
A tercio in "bastioned square," in battle.

As firearms became cheaper and more effective, they grew to widespread use among infantry beginning in the 16th century. Requiring little training, firearms soon began to make swords, maces, bows, and other weapons obsolete. Pikes, as a part of pike and shot formation, survived a good deal longer. By the mid-16th century, firearms had become the main weapons in many armies. The main firearm of that period was the arquebus. Although less accurate than the bow, an arquebus could penetrate most armours of the period and required little training. In response, armor thickened, making it very heavy and expensive. As a result, the cuirass replaced the mail hauberk and full suits of armour, and only the most valuable cavalry wore more than a padded shirt.

Soldiers armed with arquebuses were usually placed in three lines so one line would be able to fire, while the other two could reload. This tactic enabled an almost constant flow of gunfire to be maintained and made up for the inaccuracy of the weapon. In order to hold back cavalry, wooden palisades or pikemen would be in front of arquebusiers. An example of this is the Battle of Nagashino.

Maurice of Nassau, leader of the 1580s Dutch Revolt, made a number of tactical innovations, one of which was to break his infantry into smaller and more mobile units, rather than the traditional clumsy and slow-moving squares. The introduction of volley fire helped compensate for the inaccuracy of musket fire and was first used in European combat at Nieuwpoort in 1600. These changes required well-drilled troops who could maintain formation while repeatedly loading and reloading, combined with better control and thus leadership. The overall effect was to professionalise both officers and men; Maurice is sometimes claimed as the creator of the modern officer corps.

His innovations were further adapted by Gustavus Adolphus who increased the effectiveness and speed of volley fire by using the more reliable wheel-lock musket and paper cartridge, while improving mobility by removing heavy armour. Perhaps the biggest change was to increase the numbers of musketeers and eliminating the need for pikemen by using the plug bayonet. Its disadvantage was that the musket could not be fired once fixed; the socket bayonet overcame this issue but the technical problem of keeping it attached took time to perfect.

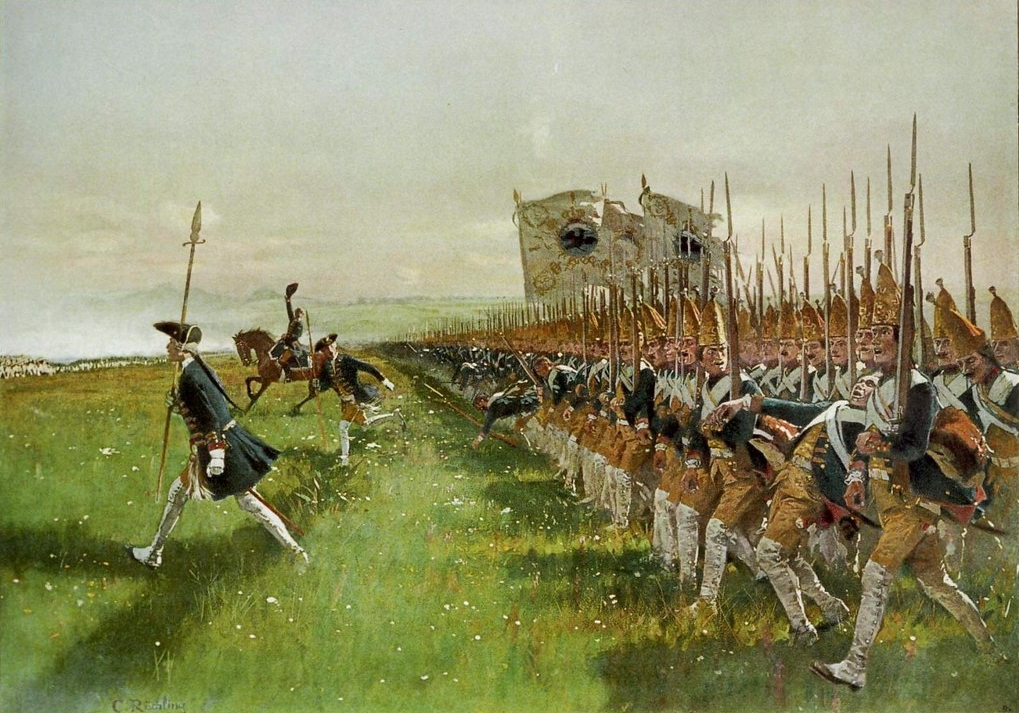
Prussian line infantry attack at the 1745 Battle of Hohenfriedberg.

Once this was resolved in the early 18th century, the accepted practice was for both sides to fire then charging with fixed bayonets; this required careful calculation since the closer the lines, the more effective the first volleys. One of the most famous examples of this was at Fontenoy in 1745 when the British and French troops allegedly invited each other to fire first.

The late 17th century emphasised the defence and assault of fortified places and avoiding battle unless on extremely favourable terms. In the 18th century, changes in infantry tactics and weapons meant a greater willingness to accept battle and so drill, discipline and retaining formation became more important. There were many reasons for this, one being that until the invention of smokeless powder, retaining contact with the men on either side of you was sometimes the only way of knowing which way to advance. Infantry in line was extremely vulnerable to cavalry attack, leading to the development of the carré or square; while not unknown, it was rare for cavalry to break a well-held square.

=== Late modern period ===
==== Napoleonic ====
Napoleon Bonaparte implemented many military reforms to change the nature of warfare. Napoleon's single greatest legacy in warfare was the extensive use and elaboration of the disseminated army; he separated groups of units in his army to spread them out over a wider area but kept them under his central command unlike in earlier times when each separate division would have fought independently. This allowed him to force battle by turning or encircling the enemy army where in previous eras armies only fought by mutual consent or because a surprise manoeuvre had them trapped against an obstacle such as a river.

He relied heavily on the column, a formation less than a hundred men wide and containing an entire brigade in tight formation and mostly advanced to contact with the bayonet. The constant movement and sheer mass of this formation could break through most enemy lines, but was susceptible to being broken by well-drilled or large volumes of fire as it could not fire as it advanced. Its main advantage was its ability to march rapidly and then deploy into line comparatively easily, especially with well-drilled and motivated troops such as those available to Napoleon after the French Revolution. He later utilised the Mixed Order formation which could be a combination of one or more lines supported by one or more columns. This offered the extended firepower of the line with the rapid reaction ability of the column in support.

The column formation allowed the unit rapid movement, a very effective charge (due to weight of numbers) or it could quickly form square to resist cavalry attacks, but by its nature, only a fraction of its muskets would be able to open fire. The line offered a substantially larger musket frontage allowing for greater shooting capability but required extensive training to allow the unit to move over ground as one while retaining the line.

The mixed order remained a part of French tactical doctrine as the French army grew in discipline, capitalising as it did on the strengths of both the line and column formations while avoiding some of their inherent weaknesses. It was used extensively by Napoleon when commanding the Grande Armée.

This greatly surpassed other armies at the time which had to move slowly to keep their lines aligned and coherent and as such keep the cavalry from their interior; spaces could be guarded with musket fire, but the line had to be generally aligned and this could be lost over even apparently flat undulating ground as individuals slowed or sped up across uneven ground. The only antidote was slow movement and the column afforded tactical battlefield manoeuvrability and as such a chance to outflank or outmanoeuvre the enemy, or, more importantly, concentrate against weaknesses in the enemy lines.

Napoleon was also an avid user of artillery —he began his career as an artillery officer— and used the artillery to great effect due to his specialist knowledge. The French army after the French Revolution was greatly motivated and after the reforms of 1791, well trained in the newest doctrine.

Napoleon was eventually defeated, but his tactics were studied well into the 19th Century, even as improved weapons made massed infantry attacks increasingly hazardous.

==== Irregular tactics ====
Countries which have not been major world powers have used many other infantry tactics. In South Africa, the Zulu impis (regiments) were infamous for their bull horn tactic. It involved four groups - two in the front, one on the left, and one on the right. They would surround the enemy unit, close in, and destroy them with short assegai, or iklwas while fire-armed Zulus kept up a harassing fire. The Zulu warriors surprised and often overwhelmed their enemies, even much better armed and equipped enemies such as the British army.

The Sudanese fought their enemies by using a handful of riflemen to lure enemy riflemen into the range of concealed Sudanese spearmen. In New Zealand, the Māori hid in fortified bunkers or pā that could withstand strikes from even some of the most powerful weapons of the 19th century before luring opposing forces into an ambush. Sometimes the natives would arm themselves with weapons similar or superior to those of the imperialistic country they were fighting. During the Battle of Little Bighorn, Lt. Colonel George Custer and five out of twelve companies of the 7th Cavalry were destroyed by a force of Sioux and Cheyenne.

Unconventional infantry tactics often put a conventional enemy at a disadvantage. During the Second Boer War, the Boers used guerrilla tactics to fight the conventional British Army. Boer marksmen would often pick off British soldiers from hundreds of yards away. These constant sniper attacks forced the British infantry to begin wearing khaki uniforms instead of their traditional red. The Boers were much more mobile than the British infantry and thus could usually choose where a battle would take place. These unconventional tactics forced the British to adopt some unorthodox tactics of their own.

==== After 1945 ====
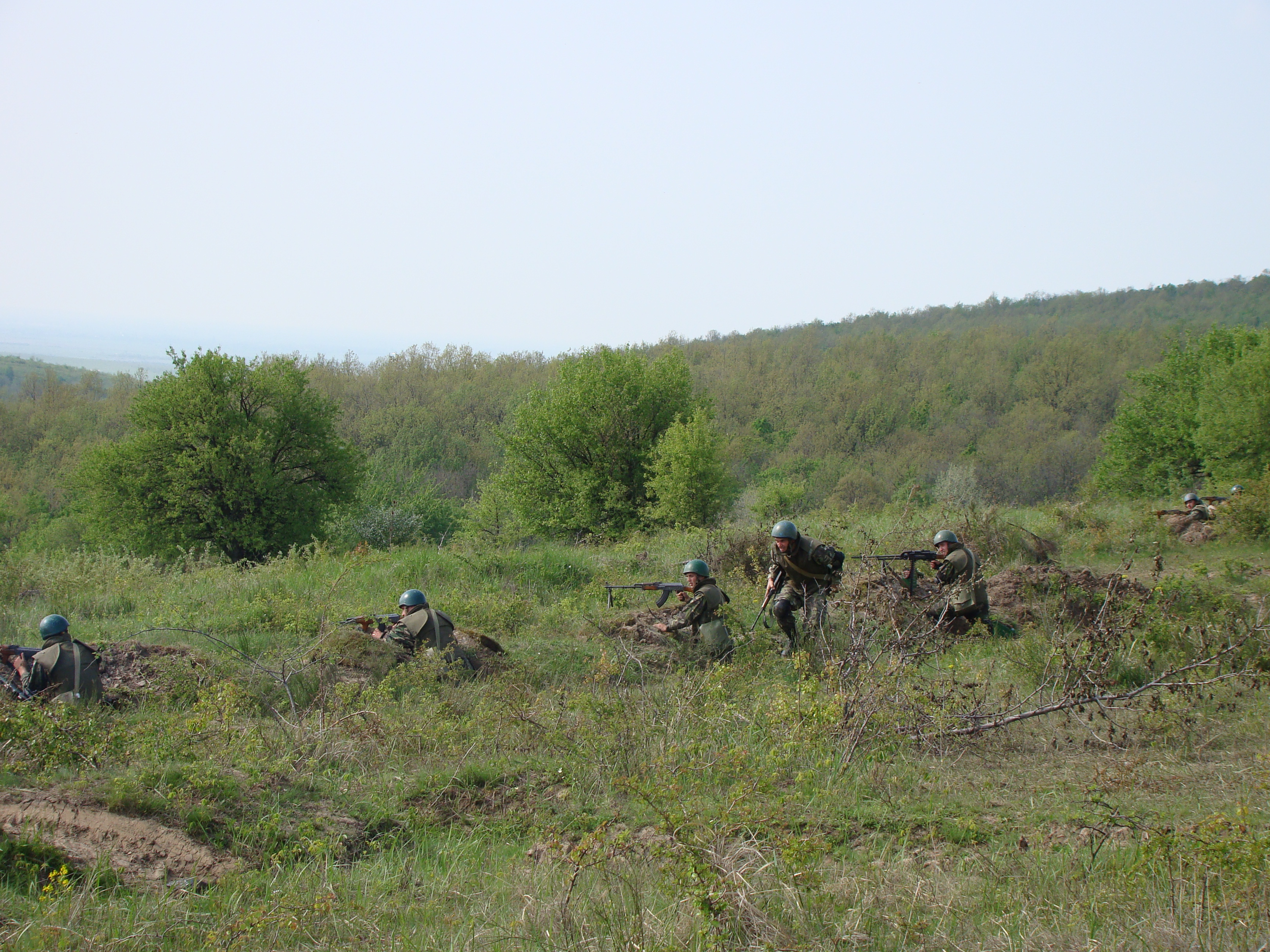
A Romanian squad of a TAB-77 APC. This is a typical Soviet arrangement, with a PK general purpose machine gun and a RPK light machine gun in the center and two soldiers with AK-47 assault rifles and one RPG-7 grenade launcher on the flanks. Another soldier provides liaison or extra firepower where needed.

The Korean War was the first major conflict following World War II. New devices, including smaller radios and the helicopter were also introduced. Parachute drops, which tended to scatter a large number of men over the battlefield, were replaced by airmobile operations using helicopters to deliver men in a precise manner. Helicopters also provided fire support in many cases, and could be rushed to deliver precision strikes on the enemy. Thus, the infantry was free to range far beyond the conventional fixed artillery positions. They could even operate behind enemy lines, and later be extracted by air. This led to the concept of vertical envelopment (originally conceived for airborne), in which the enemy is not flanked to the left or right, but rather from above.

== Mobile infantry tactics ==
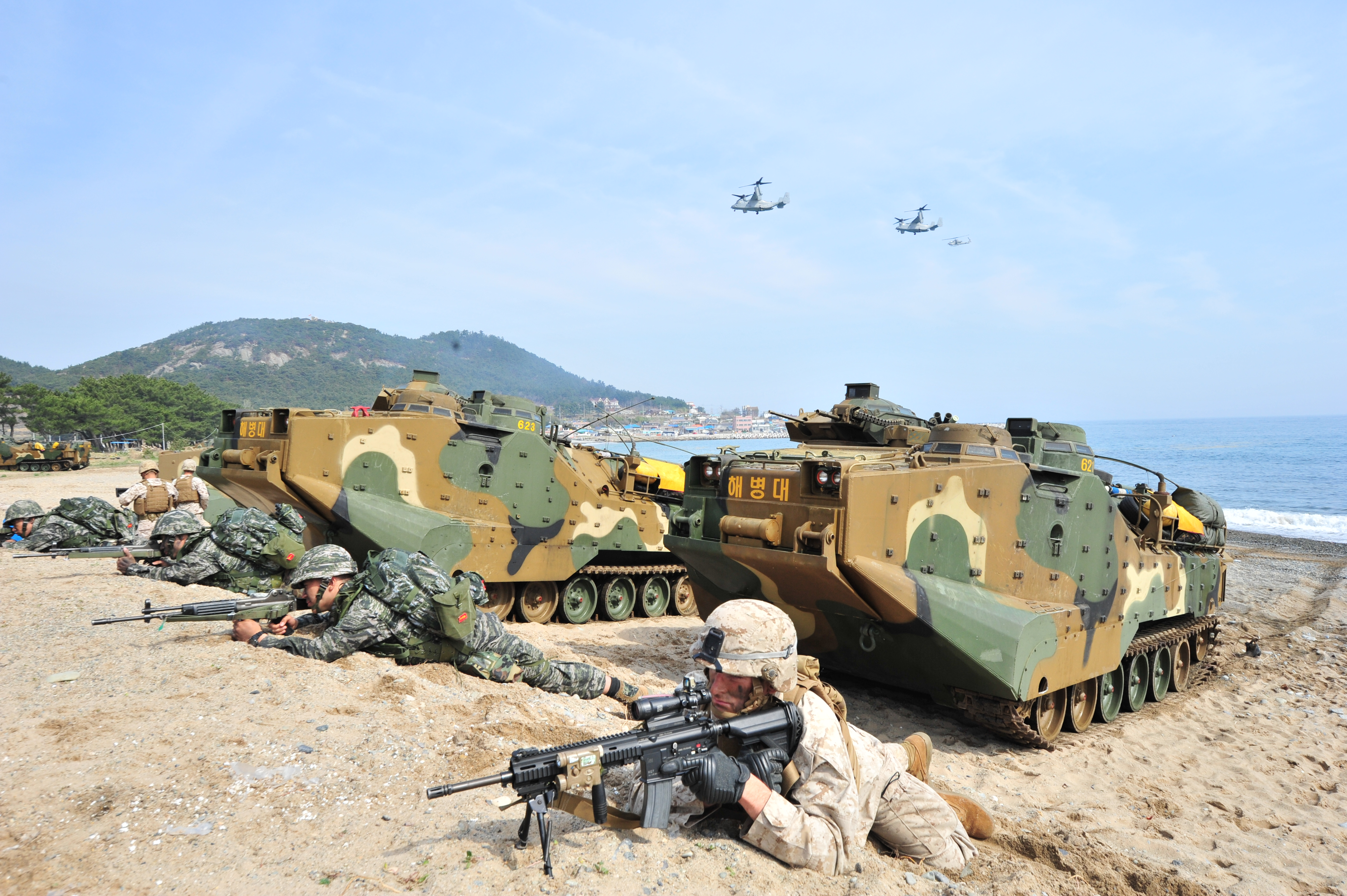
South Korean and American marines during an amphibious warfare exercise, supported by Assault Amphibious Vehicles and V-22 Ospreys

As part of the development of armored warfare, typified by blitzkrieg, new infantry tactics were devised. More than ever, battles consisted of infantry working together with tanks, aircraft, artillery as part of combined arms. One example of this is how infantry would be sent ahead of tanks to search for anti-tank teams, while tanks would provide cover for the infantry. Portable radios allowed field commanders to communicate with their HQs, allowing new orders to be relayed instantly.

Another major development was the means of transportation; no longer did soldiers have to walk (or ride a horse) from location to location. The prevalence of motor transport, however, has been overstated; Germany used more horses for transport in World War II than in World War I, and British troops as late as June 1944 were still not fully motorized. Although there were trucks in World War I, their mobility could never be fully exploited because of the trench warfare stalemate, as well as the terribly torn up terrain at the front and the ineffectiveness of vehicles at the time. During World War II, infantry could be moved from one location to another using half-tracks, trucks, and even aircraft, which left them better rested and able to fight once they reached their objective.

A new type of infantry, the paratrooper, was deployed as well. These lightly armed soldiers would parachute behind enemy lines, hoping to catch the enemy off-guard. First used by the Germans in 1940, they were to seize key objectives and hold long enough for additional forces to arrive. They required prompt support from regulars, however; First British Airborne was decimated at Arnhem after being left essentially cut off.

To counter the tank threat, World War II infantry initially had few options other than the so-called "Molotov cocktail" (first used by Chinese troops against Japanese tanks around Shanghai in 1937) and anti-tank rifle. Neither was particularly effective, especially if armor was accompanied by supporting infantry. These, and later anti-tank mines, some of which could be magnetically attached to the tank, required the user to get closer than was prudent. Later developments, such as the bazooka, PIAT, and Panzerfaust, allowed a more effective attack against armor from a distance. Thus, especially in the ruined urban zones, tanks were forced to enter accompanied by squads of infantry.

Marines became prominent during the Pacific War. These soldiers were capable of amphibious warfare on a scale not previously known. As Naval Infantry, both Japanese and American Marines enjoyed the support of naval craft such as battleships, cruisers, and the newly developed aircraft carriers. As with conventional infantry, the Marines used radios to communicate with their supporting elements. They could call in sea and air bombardment very quickly.

The widespread availability of helicopters following World War II allowed the emergence of an air mobility tactics such as aerial envelopment.

=== Squad tactics ===
Small unit tactics, squad in particular, had basic principles of assault, and support elements that were generally adopted by all the major combatants, with differences being in the exact size of units, placement of the elements and specialized guidance.

==== Offensive tactics ====
The main goal was to advance by means of fire and movement with minimal casualties while maintaining unit effectiveness and control.

The German squad would win the Feuerkampf (fire fight), then occupy key positions. The rifle and machine gun teams were not separate, but part of the Gruppe, though men were often firing at will. Victory went to the side able to concentrate the most fire on target most quickly. Generally, soldiers were ordered to hold fire until the enemy was 600 metres (660 yards) or closer, when troops opened fire on mainly large targets; individuals were fired upon only from 400 metres (440 yards) or below.

The German squad had two main formations while moving on the battlefield. When advancing in the Reihe, or single file, formation, the commander took the lead, followed by the machine gunner and his assistants, then riflemen, with the assistant squad commander moving on the rear. The Reihe moved mostly on tracks and it presented a small target on the front. In some cases, the machine gun could be deployed while the rest of the squad held back. In most cases, the soldiers took advantage of the terrain, keeping behind contours and cover, and running out into the open when there were none to be found.

A Reihe could easily be formed into Schützenkette, or skirmish line. The machine gun deployed on the spot, while riflemen came up on the right, left or both sides. The result was a ragged line with men about five paces apart, taking cover whenever available. In areas where resistance was serious, the squad executed "fire and movement". This was used either with the entire squad, or the machine gun team down while riflemen advanced. Commanders were often cautioned not to fire the machine gun until forced to do so by enemy fire. The object of the firefight was to not necessarily to destroy the enemy, but Niederkämpfen - to beat down, silence, or neutralize them.

The final phases of an offensive squad action were the firefight, advance, assault, and occupation of position:

The Fire Fight was the fire unit section. The section commander usually only commanded the light machine gunner (LMG) to open fire upon the enemy. If much cover existed and good fire effect was possible, riflemen took part early. Most riflemen had to be on the front later to prepare for the assault. Usually, they fired individually unless their commander ordered them to focus on one target.

The Advance was the section that worked its way forward in a loose formation. Usually, the LMG formed the front of the attack. The farther the riflemen followed behind the LMG, the more easily the rear machine guns could shoot past them.

The Assault was the main offensive in the squad action. The commander made an assault whenever he was given the opportunity rather than being ordered to do so. The whole section was rushed into the assault while the commander led the way. Throughout the assault, the enemy had to be engaged with the maximum rate of fire. The LMG took part in the assault, firing on the move. Using hand grenades, machine pistols, rifles, pistols, and entrenching tools, the squad tried to break the enemy resistance. The squad had to reorganize quickly once the assault was over.

When occupying a position (The Occupation of Position), the riflemen group up into twos or threes around the LMG so they could hear the section commander.

The American squad's basic formations were very similar to that of the Germans. The U.S. squad column had the men strung out with the squad leader and BAR man in front with riflemen in a line behind them roughly 60 paces long. This formation was easily controlled and maneuvered and it was suitable for crossing areas open to artillery fire, moving through narrow covered routes, and for fast movement in woods, fog, smoke, and darkness.

The skirmish line was very similar to the Schützenkette formation. In it, the squad was deployed in a line roughly 60 paces long. It was suitable for short rapid dashes but was not easy to control. The squad wedge was an alternative to the skirmish line and was suitable for ready movement in any direction or for emerging from cover. Wedges were often used away from the riflemen's range of fire as it was much more vulnerable than the skirmish line.

In some instances, especially when a squad was working independently to seize an enemy position, the commander ordered the squad to attack in sub-teams. "Team Able", made up of two riflemen scouts, would locate the enemy; "Team Baker", composed of a BAR man and three riflemen, would open fire. "Team Charlie", made up of the squad leader and the last five riflemen, would make the assault. The assault is given whenever possible and without regard to the progress of the other squads. After the assault, the squad advanced, dodging for cover, and the bayonets were fixed. They would move rapidly toward the enemy, firing and advancing in areas occupied by hostile soldiers. Such fire would usually be delivered in a standing position at a rapid rate. After taking the enemy's position, the commander would either order his squad to defend or continue the advance.

The British method formations depended chiefly on the ground and the type of enemy fire that was encountered. Five squad formations were primarily used: blobs, single file, loose file, irregular arrowhead, and the extended line. The blob formation, first used in 1917, referred to ad hoc gatherings of 2 to 4 men, hidden as well as possible. The regular single file formation was only used in certain circumstances, such as when the squad was advancing behind a hedgerow. The loose file formation was a slightly more scattered line suitable for rapid movement, but vulnerable to enemy fire. Arrowheads could deploy rapidly from either flank and were hard to stop from the air. The Extended Line was perfect for the final assault, but it was vulnerable if fired upon from the flank.

The British squad would commonly break up into two groups for the attack. The Bren group consisted of the two-man Bren gun team and second in command that formed one element, while the main body of the riflemen with the squad commander formed another. The larger group that contained the commander was responsible for closing in on the enemy and advancing promptly when under fire. When under effective fire, riflemen went to fully fledged "fire and movement". The riflemen were ordered to fall to the ground as if they had been shot, and then crawl to a good firing position. They took rapid aim and fired independently until the squad commander called for cease fire. On some occasions the Bren group advanced by bounds, to a position where it could effectively commence fire, preferably at 90 degrees to the main assault. In this case both the groups would give each other cover fire. The final attack was made by the riflemen who were ordered to fire at the hip as they went in; as they attached the Bren group redeployed to deliver fire support and eliminate stragglers.

==== Defensive tactics ====
German defensive squad tactics stressed the importance of integration with larger plans and principles in posts scattered in depth. A Gruppe was expected to dig in at 30 to 40 metres (33 to 44 yd) (the maximum that a squad leader could effectively oversee). Other cover such as single trees and crests were said to attract too much enemy fire and were rarely used. While digging, one member of the squad was to stand sentry. Gaps between dug-in squads may be left, but covered by fire. The placing of the machine gun was key to the German squad defence, which was given several alternative positions, usually being placed 50 metres (55 yards) apart.

Pairs of soldiers were deployed in foxholes, trenches, or ditches. The pair stood close together in order to communicate with each other. The small sub-sections would be slightly separated, thus decreasing the effect of enemy fire. If the enemy did not immediately mobilize, the second stage of defense, entrenching, was employed. These trenches were constructed behind the main line where soldiers could be kept back under cover until they were needed.

The defensive firefight was conducted by the machine gun at an effective range while riflemen were concealed in their foxholes until the enemy assault. Enemy grenades falling on the squad's position were avoided by diving away from the blast or by simply throwing or kicking the grenade back. This tactic was very dangerous and U.S. sources report American soldiers losing hands and feet this way.

In the latter part of the war, emphasis was put on defense against armored vehicles. Defensive positions were built on a "tank-proof obstacle" composed of at least one anti-tank weapon as well as artillery support directed by an observer. To intercept enemy tanks probing a defensive position, squads often patrolled with an anti-tank weapon.

=== Platoon tactics ===
Platoon is made up of squads and a command element. Usually 4 squads make up a platoon, but this can vary by the army and time period. Command element is small and is often just one officer and one NCO. Together a platoon is about 40 soldiers.

For tactics, platoon can function independently, providing its own covering fire, and have an assaulting element. For this there is a division made by the platoon leader regarding what squads are assigned what combat task (defense or offense). Within offense (assault, fire support, or in reserve)

It can also function as part of the company.

=== Company level tactics ===
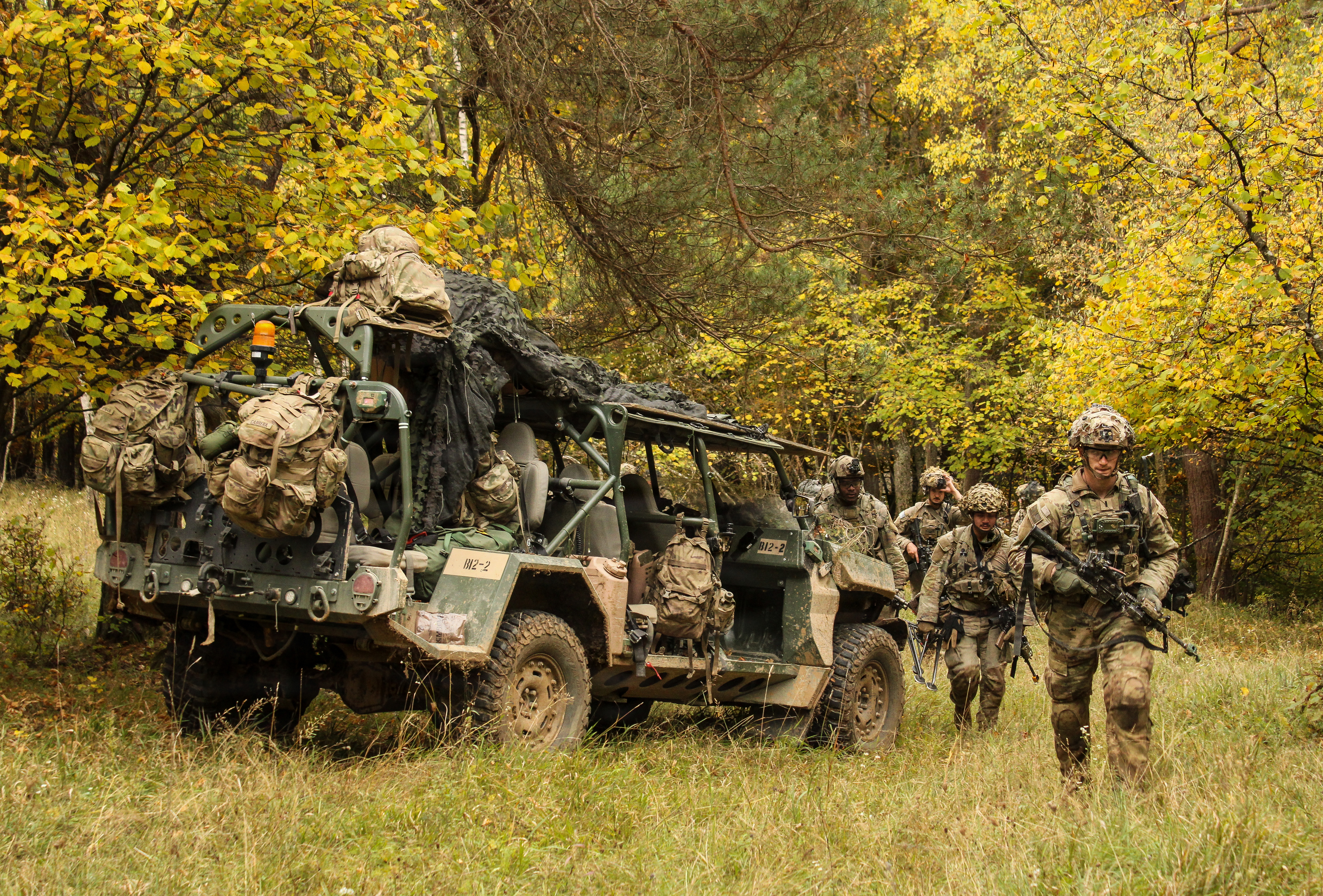
Dismounted infantry from Alpha Company, 1-502nd Infantry Battalion, 2nd Brigade, 101st Airborne Division alongside an Infantry Squad Vehicle during training.

Company is made up of platoons. Usually some platoons are “line” platoons, meaning they consist of soldiers with standard weapons, and then there is a support element (totaling the size of another platoon), with heavier weapons, namely mortars, heavier machine guns. It also has a larger supply unit, usually 3-10 soldiers, a small medic unit, supply unit and a communication unit. Companies in 20th century varied quite a bit by country of origin, but for Germany, USA, and UK between 170 and 200 soldiers was about the normal.

Dedicated supply section entered the military hierarchy at the company level.

Tactics start to become more complex at the company level, as more weapon systems are available at the commander's disposal.

In World War II, some interesting variations are bicycle messengers in German infantry companies, and two snipers in a Soviet rifle company.

Generally, in all the armies of the 20th century, a company is the first unit that is designed to function autonomously.

=== Battalion level tactics ===
Battalion is made up of line companies, larger headquarters, and heavier support weapons.

Ratio remains the same. Usually three line companies and one support unit.

Battalions are led by a Major or Lieutenant Colonel, with a staff of about 30-40 soldiers. Exception here are Soviet units which traditionally had smaller staffs than American or German counterparts.

A battalion is the first level that intelligence, combat engineers, air-defense and anti-tank artillery entered a unit.

Tactics of a battalion gave a lot more flexibility to the commander. In 20th century, usual deployment involved certain amount of units deployed, with specific weapon systems supporting it, creating a chess style scenario, where the side on the offensive would generally try to attack least powerful elements, while the defense would try to anticipate the correct threat and neutralize it with appropriate weapon systems.

=== Regiment level tactics ===
Regiment is the final level in tactical infantry progression. After regiment you have division, and that is operational level.

=== Infantry entrenchment ===
During the Second World War, trenches, ditches, foxholes and Dragon's teeth (fortification) were used extensively.

== Infantry warfare by type ==
=== Jungle warfare ===
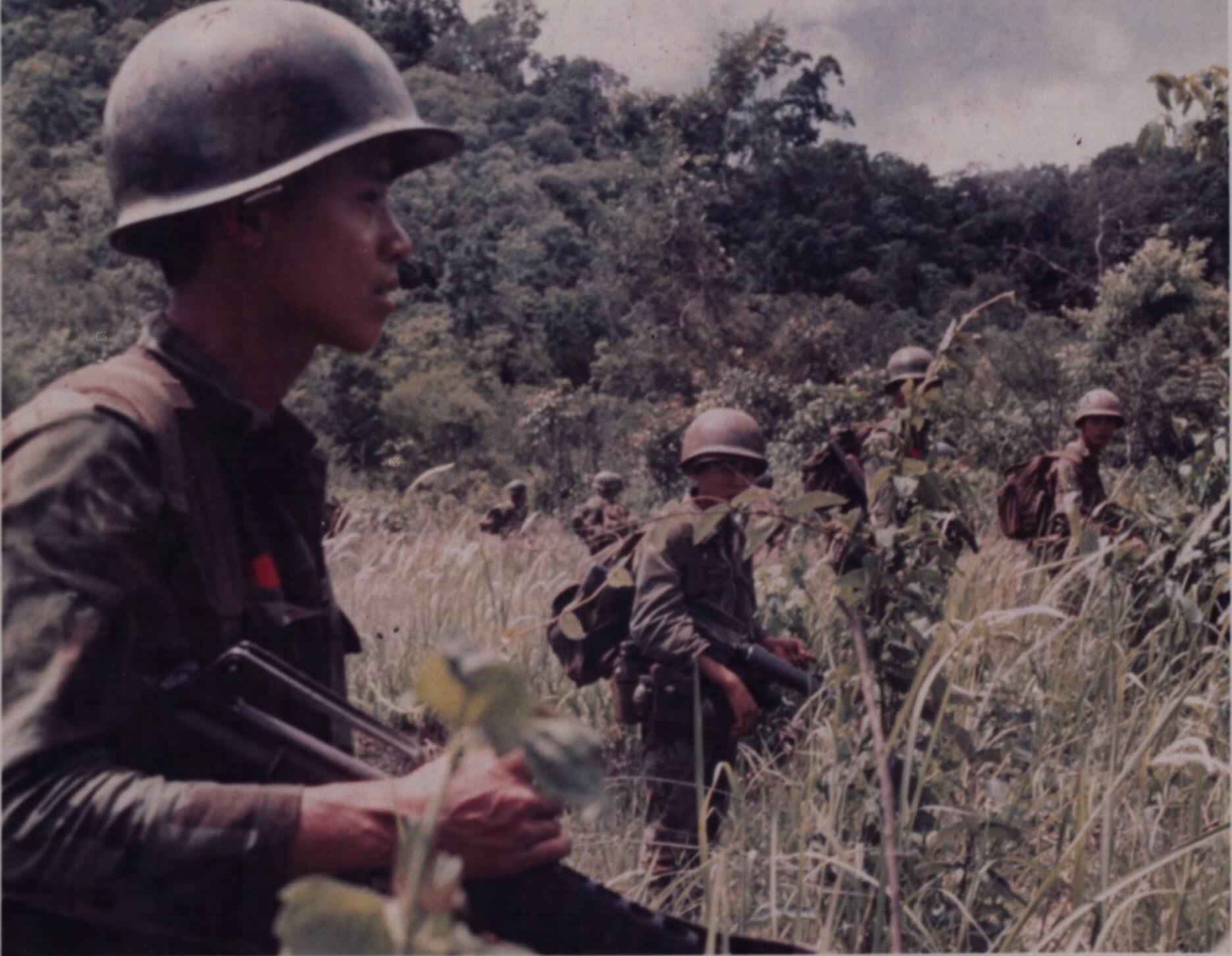
Army of the Republic of Vietnam Rangers sweeping a jungle during the Vietnam War, 1970

Jungle warfare was heavily shaped by the experiences of all the major powers in the Southeast Asian theatre of operations during World War II. Jungle terrain tended to break up and isolate units. It tended to fragment the battle. It called for greater independence and leadership among junior leaders, and all the major powers increased the level of training and experience level required for junior officers and NCOs. But fights in which squad or platoon leaders found themselves fighting on their own also called for more firepower. All the combatants, therefore, found ways to increase both the firepower of individual squads and platoons. The intent was to ensure that they could fight on their own ... which often proved to be the case.

Japan, as one example, increased the number of heavy weapons in each squad. The "strengthened" squad used from 1942 onwards was normally 15 men. The Japanese squad contained one squad automatic weapon (a machine gun fed from a magazine and light enough to be carried by one gunner and an assistant ammunition bearer). A designated sniper was also part of the team, as was a grenadier with a rifle-grenade launcher.

The squad's weaponry also included a grenade-launcher team armed with what some historians might often mistakenly call a "knee mortar". This was in fact a light mortar of 50 mm that threw high explosive, illumination and smoke rounds out to as far as 400 metres. Set on the ground and fired with arm outstretched, the operator varied the range by adjusting the height of the firing pin within the barrel (allowing the mortar to be fired through small holes in the jungle canopy). The balance of the squad carried bolt-action rifles.

The result was that each squad was now a self-sufficient combat unit. Each squad had an automatic weapons capability. In a defensive role, the machine gun could be set to create a “beaten zone” of bullets through which no enemy could advance and survive. In an attack, it could throw out a hail of bullets to keep the opponent's head down while friendly troops advanced. The light mortar gave the squad leader an indirect "hip-pocket artillery" capability. It could fire high-explosive and fragmentation rounds to flush enemy out of dugouts and hides. It could fire smoke to conceal an advance, or illumination rounds to light up any enemy target at night. The sniper gave the squad leader a long-range point-target-killing capability.

Four squads composed a platoon. There was no headquarters section, only the platoon leader and the platoon sergeant. In effect, the platoon could fight as four independent, self-contained battle units (a concept very similar to the U.S. Army Ranger "chalks".)

The British Army did extensive fighting in the jungles and rubber plantations of Malaya during the Emergency, and in Borneo against Indonesia during the Confrontation. As a result of these experiences, the British increased the close-range firepower of their individual riflemen by replacing the pre-World War II bolt-action Lee–Enfield with lighter, automatic weapons like the American M2 carbine and the Sterling submachine gun.

However, the British Army was already blessed in its possession of a good squad automatic weapon (the Bren) and these remained apportioned one per squad. They comprised the bulk of the squad's firepower, even after the introduction of the self-loading rifle (a semi-automatic copy of the Belgian FN-FAL). The British did not deploy a mortar on the squad level. However, there was one 2-inch mortar on the platoon level.

The U.S. Army took a slightly different approach. They believed the experience in Vietnam showed the value of smaller squads carrying a higher proportion of heavier weapons. The traditional 12-man squad armed with semi-automatic rifles and an automatic rifle was knocked down to 9 men: The squad leader carried the M16 and AN/PRC-6 radio. He commanded two fire teams of four men apiece (each containing one team leader with M16, grenadier with M16/203, designated automatic rifleman with M16 and bipod, and an anti-tank gunner with LAW and M16).

Three squads composed a platoon along with two three-man machine gun teams (team leader with M16, gunner with M60 machine gun, and assistant gunner with M16). The addition of two M60 machine gun teams created more firepower on the platoon level. The platoon leader could arrange these to give covering fire, using his remaining three squads as his maneuver element. The M16/203 combination was a particular American creation (along with its M79 parent). It did not have the range of the Japanese 50 mm mortar. However, it was handier, and could still lay down indirect high-explosive fire, and provide support with both smoke and illumination rounds. The US Army also had 60 mm mortars. This was a bigger, more capable weapon than the Japanese 50 mm weapon. But it was too heavy for use on the squad or even the platoon level. These were only deployed on the company level.

The deficiency of the US formation remained the automatic rifleman, a tradition that had gone back to the Browning Automatic Rifle (BAR) gunner of World War II. The US Army discovered that an automatic rifle was a poor substitute for a real machine gun. A rifle fired in the sustained automatic role easily overheated, and its barrel could not be changed. In post-Vietnam, the US Army adopted the Belgian Minimi to replace the automatic M16. With an interchangeable barrel and larger magazine, this weapon, known as the M249 in U.S. inventory, provided the sustained automatic fire required.

The Republic of Singapore Army, whose experience is 100% in primary and secondary jungle as well as rubber plantation terrain, took the trend one step further. Their squad contained only seven men, but fielded two squad automatic gunners (with 5.56mm squad automatic weapons), two grenadiers with M16/203 underslung grenade launchers, and one anti-tank gunner with rocket launcher and assault rifle.

So in short, jungle warfare increased the number of short/sharp engagements on the platoon or even squad level. Platoon and squad leaders had to be more capable of independent action. To do this, each squad (or at least platoon) needed a balanced allocation of weapons that would allow it to complete its mission unaided.

=== Mountain warfare ===
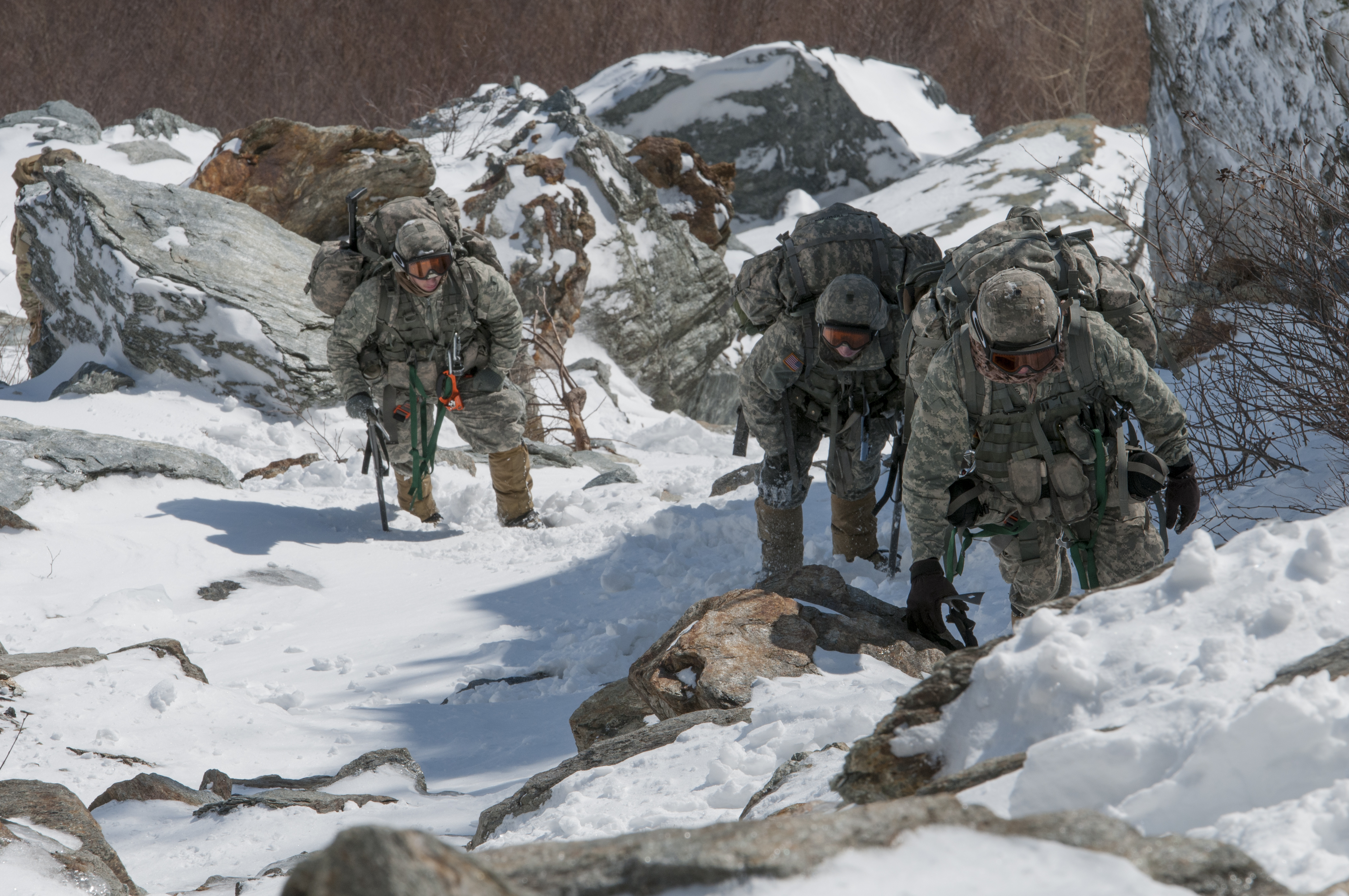
United States Army soldiers of the Army Mountain Warfare School climbing Smugglers Notch, Vermont

During the Soviet–Afghan War, the Soviet Army and Air Force fought forces called the Mujahideen. Although the Soviet Army had greater firepower and modern equipment than the Mujahideen, they were not able to completely destroy them because of the difficulty of countering guerrilla tactics in the mountains.

When the Stinger missile was supplied to the Mujahideen, they began to ambush Soviet helicopters and fixed wing aircraft in proximity of the military airfields. This was because the Stinger was only effective at a range of 15,000 feet (4,600 m), requiring the Mujahideen to attack the aircraft as they were landing or taking off. The Stinger, however, was not the "weapon that won the war". Although it did have a significant effect on the conduct of war, it was not used to shoot down very many aircraft. It did force the Soviets to modify their helicopter tactics. Helicopters begun to cooperate more closely with the ground forces, fixed wing aircraft began flying at higher altitudes, and armor and anti-missile electronic defense systems were added to aircraft to help protect them from the Stinger.

The Soviets countered the Mujahideen tactics in various ways. The Spetsnaz were used extensively in special operations by being deployed by helicopter into areas identified as areas often transited by the Mujahideen, or sites of ambushes. Spetsnaz tactics were effective against Mujahideen as they adapted and employed similar tactic used by them; tanks and aircraft were comparatively less effective due to terrain and enemy mobility in it. The only technology with a significant impact on Mujahideen were land mines and helicopters, although over time Mujahideen were able to find ways to avoid and evade both.

As the Soviet operations stalled, they began retaliating against the civilian population for supporting the Mujahideen. It was not uncommon for Soviet helicopters to raze an Afghan village in retaliation for an attack against Soviet soldiers. At other times they dropped mines from aircraft in the fields and pastures, or shooting the livestock with helicopter weapons. Without the support of the villagers, the Mujahideen were forced to carry their own food in addition to weapons and military supplies. Another common tactic was to cordon off and search villages for Mujahideen. These tactics were not unlike those used by the United States in Vietnam, or by the Germans against Soviet partisans in World War II.

Conventional infantry tactics are generally modified before implementation in mountain warfare as the defending side generally has a decisive advantage over the attacking side by holding the heights and forcing the enemy to attack uphill against a fully prepared well entrenched position. So generally, frontal assault is avoided by implementation of blockade tactics and cutting off the supply lines, thereby creating a siege. This changed in the Kargil War of 1999 when Indian forces were faced with the huge task of flushing out intruders and disguised Pakistani soldiers who had captured high mountain posts. Instead of employing blockade tactics, Indian Army launched frontal assault against Pakistani Army positions but the tactics were intensely modified by employment of heavy artillery cover often firing in direct role and relentless air-strikes before the ground attack. As any daytime attack would be suicidal, all the attacks were made under the cover of darkness to minimize casualties. The operation took time but was successful and all the positions were recaptured by the Indian Army after two months of fighting.

=== Trench warfare ===
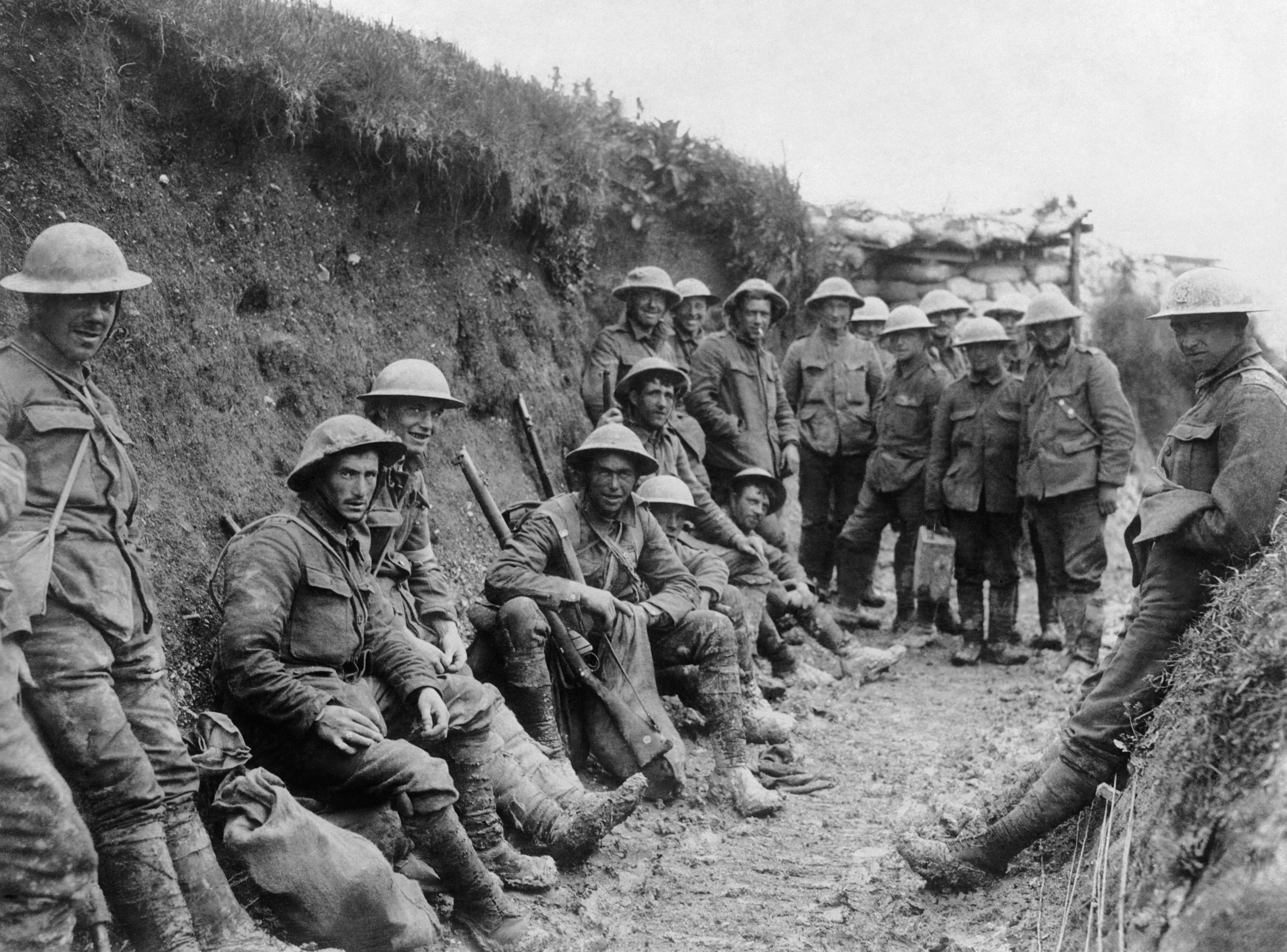
British infantry in a trench during the Battle of the Somme of World War I, 1916

During World War I, the increasing lethality of more modern weapons, such as artillery and machine guns, forced a shift in infantry tactics to trench warfare. Massed infantry charges were now essentially suicidal, and the Western Front ground to a standstill.

A common tactic used during the earlier stages of trench warfare was to shell an enemy trench line, at which point friendly infantry would leave the safety of their trenches, advance across no man's land, and seize the enemy trenches. However, this tactic of "preliminary bombardment" was largely unsuccessful. The nature of no man's land (filled with barbed wire and other obstructions) was one factor. For a unit to get to an enemy trench line, it had to cross this area, secure the enemy position, then face counterattack by opposing reserves. It also depended on the ability of friendly artillery to suppress enemy infantry and artillery, which was frequently limited by "bombproofs" (bunkers), revetments, poor ammunition, or simply inaccurate fire.

The casualties caused by machine gun fire led to the widespread deployment of light machine guns such as the Lewis Gun within minor infantry units. Trench warfare also led to the rapid development of new designs of grenades, rifle grenades and light mortars—all of which represented a rapid increase in the firepower available to low-level commanders. There was a growing emphasis on field craft, especially in the British and Dominion Armies, where night-patrolling and raiding tactics soon also demanded an increase in map-reading and navigation skills. The infantryman of 1914 was content to be trained in rifle and bayonet and usually attacked in battalion formations. By 1917 he was used to grenades, rifle grenades, light machine-guns and more specialized weapons and usually worked his way forward using platoon or section tactics.

An improvement was the creeping barrage in which artillery fire is laid immediately in front of advancing infantry to clear any enemy in their way. This played an important part in later battles such as the Battle of Arras (1917), of which Vimy Ridge was a part. The tactic required close coordination in an era before widespread use of radio, and when laying telephone wire under fire was extremely hazardous. In response, the Germans devised the elastic defence and used infiltration tactics in which shock troops quietly infiltrated the enemy's forward trenches, without the heavy bombardment that gave advance warning of an imminent attack. The French and British/Dominion Armies were also engaged in evolving similar infantry tactics. The Allies introduced the tank to overcome the deadlock of static positions but mechanical unreliability prevented them from doing so.

The Germans used specially-trained stormtroopers to great effect in 1918, during Operation Michael, breaching the Allied trench lines and allowing supporting infantry to pour through a wide breach in the front lines. Even though most of the German forces were on foot, they were soon threatening Paris. Only timely and stiff resistance, the use of reserves, and German logistical and manpower problems prevented an Allied disaster. After this spring offensive, the Allies launched a series of counter-attacks with tanks and small units of assault infantry protected by air support and short intense artillery barrages while the main infantry force followed and seized strongpoints. This forced the Germans back and after less than three months the allies had made the largest territorial gains on the western front since the war began. The Germans then sued for peace ending the war.

=== Urban warfare ===
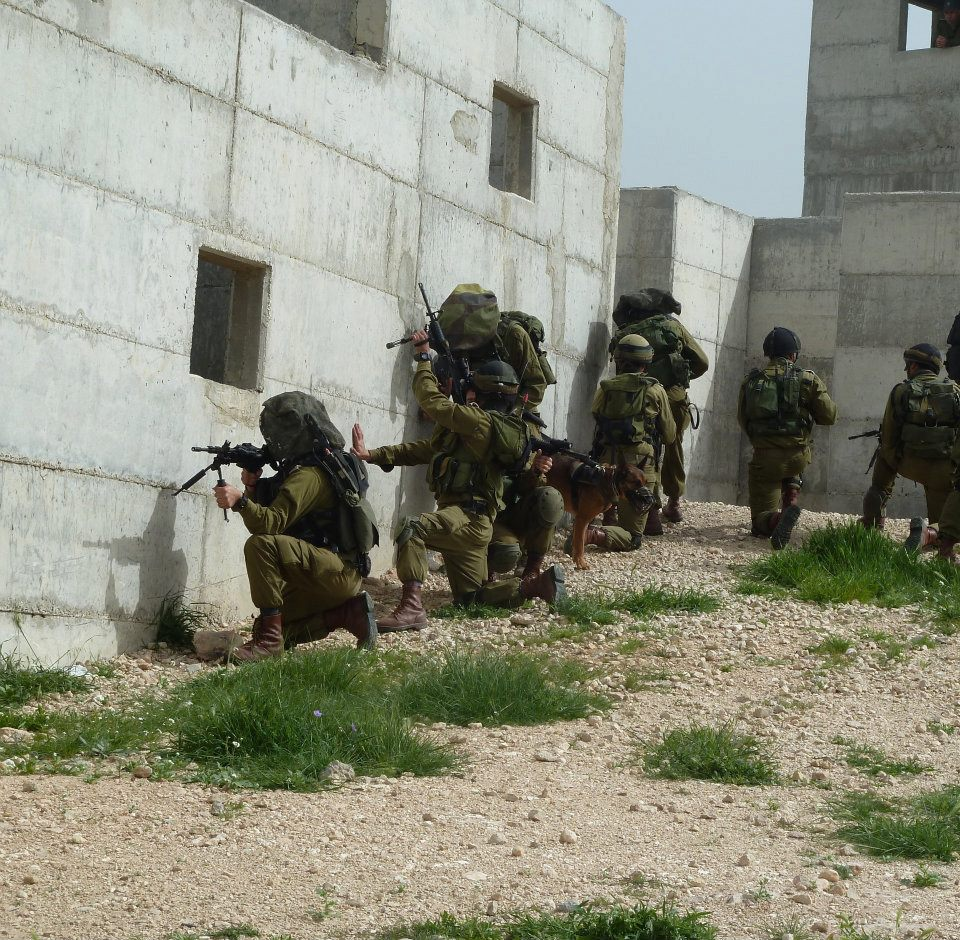
Israel Defense Forces soldiers practicing urban warfare for counterterrorism

Urban warfare draws roots from a variety of tactics and strategies. Typically fought in towns and cities, Urban combatants would encounter problems such as bystanders, buildings, and restricted mobility. Unlike the battles of Napoleon, a modern military would be restricted by narrow alleys and roads. This allows an opponent to predict or limit the movement of one's motorized vehicles by using weapons such as IEDs, RPGs, and artillery. This forces the infantry to push those threats out.

== See also ==
- Suppressive fire
- Reconnaissance by fire
- Spray and pray
- All-around defense/Perimeter defense

== Bibliography ==
=== 17th Century ===
- Dupuy, Trevor N., Colonel, U.S. Army. Evolution of Weapons and Warfare. Indianapolis: Bobbs-Merrill, 1980. ISBN 0-672-52050-8
- Dyer, Gwynne. War. New York: Crown Publishers, 1985. ISBN 0-517-55615-4

=== World War II ===
- Dr Steven Bull, World War II Infantry Tactics: Squad and Platoon, 2004 Osprey Ltd.
- David Goldovt-Ryzhenkov (Translator from Russian) 2nd Edition, 2022: Handbook for the Commander and Soldier of the Machine Gun Squad, 1941. Translated Manuals
- Dupuy, Trevor N., Colonel, U.S. Army. Evolution of Weapons and Warfare. Indianapolis: Bobbs-Merrill, 1980. ISBN 0-672-52050-8
