= Envelopment =

Military tactic of multiple attacks

Envelopment is the military tactic of seizing objectives in the enemy's rear with the goal of destroying specific enemy forces and denying them the ability to withdraw. Rather than attacking an enemy head-on, as in a frontal assault, an envelopment seeks to exploit the enemy's flanks, attacking them from multiple directions and avoiding where their defenses are strongest. A successful envelopment lessens the number of casualties suffered by the attacker while inducing a psychological shock on the defender and improving the chances to destroy them. An envelopment will consist of one or more enveloping forces, which attacks the enemy's flank(s), and a fixing force, which attacks the enemy's front and "fixes" them in place so that they cannot withdraw or shift their focus on the enveloping forces. While a successful tactic, there are risks involved with performing an envelopment. The enveloping force can become overextended and cut off from friendly forces by an enemy counterattack, or the enemy can counterattack against the fixing force.

According to the United States Army there exist four types of envelopment:

- A flanking maneuver or single envelopment consists of one enveloping force attacking one of the enemy's flanks. This is extremely effective if the holding forces are in a well defensible spot (e.g., Alexander the Great's hammer and anvil at the Battle of Issus) or if there is a strong, hidden line behind a weak flank (e.g. Battle of Breitenfeld (1631) and Battle of Rocroi).
- A pincer movement or double envelopment consists of two simultaneous flanking maneuvers. Hannibal devised this strategy in his tactical masterpiece, the Battle of Cannae. Later on, the Rashidun Caliphate General Khalid ibn al-Walid applied the maneuver in a decisive battle against the Sassanid Empire during the Battle of Walaja. In 1940 and 1941, in World War II, the Germans repeatedly employed this tactic to encircle hundreds of thousands of enemy troops at once, namely in the Battle of France and in Operation Barbarossa against the USSR.
- An encirclement whereby the enemy is surrounded and isolated in a pocket. The friendly forces can choose to attack the pocket or invest it (to stop resupplies and to prevent breakouts) and wait for a beleaguered enemy to surrender.
- A vertical envelopment is "a tactical maneuver in which troops, either air-dropped or air-landed, attack the rear and flanks of a force, in effect cutting off or encircling the force".

A special type is the cabbage tactics that has been used by the Chinese Navy around disputed islands. Its goal is to create a layered envelopment of the target.

== See also ==
- Platform envelopment
