= Hedgehog defence =

Military tactic

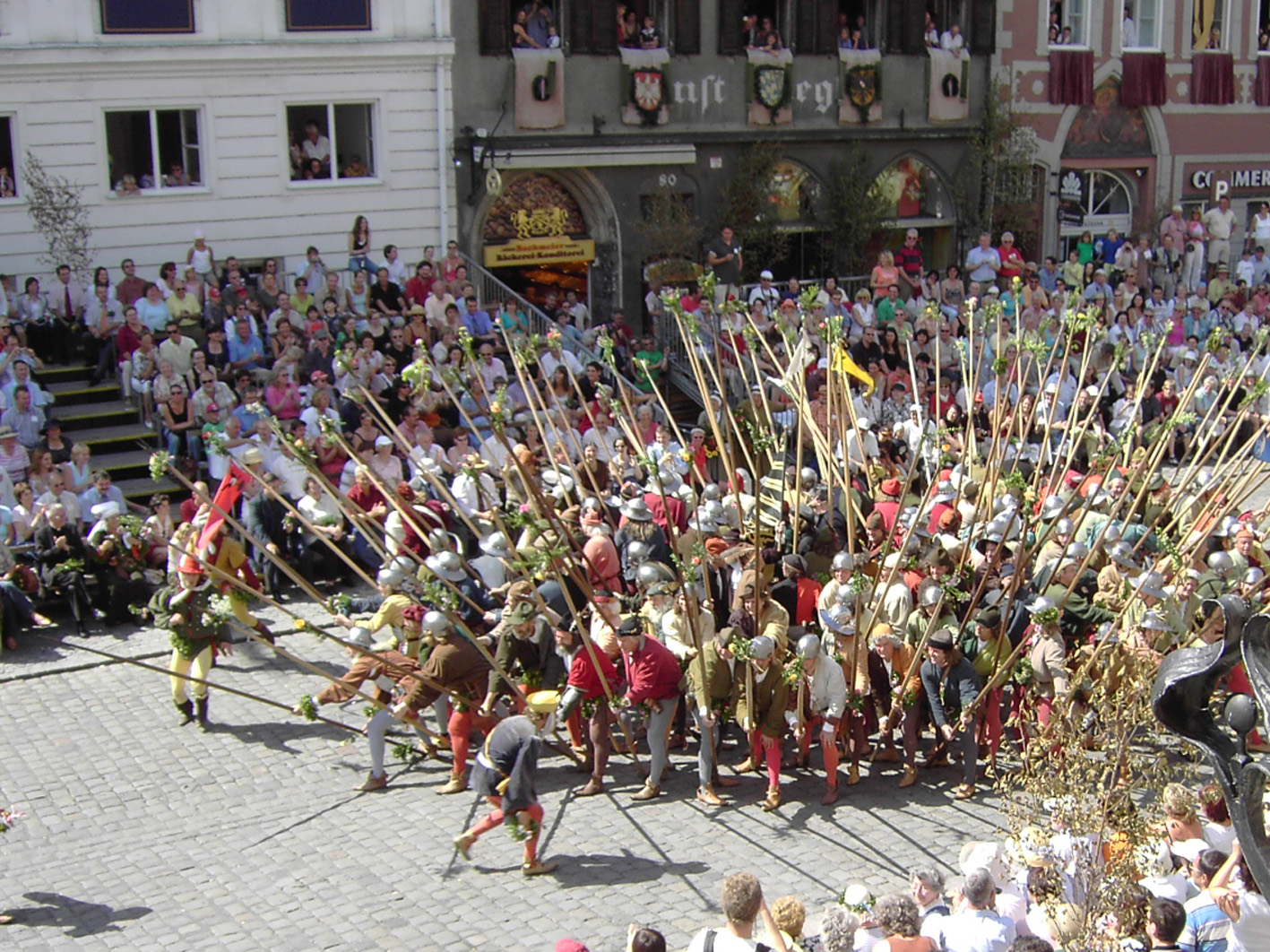
Hedgehog at the Landshut Wedding of 2005

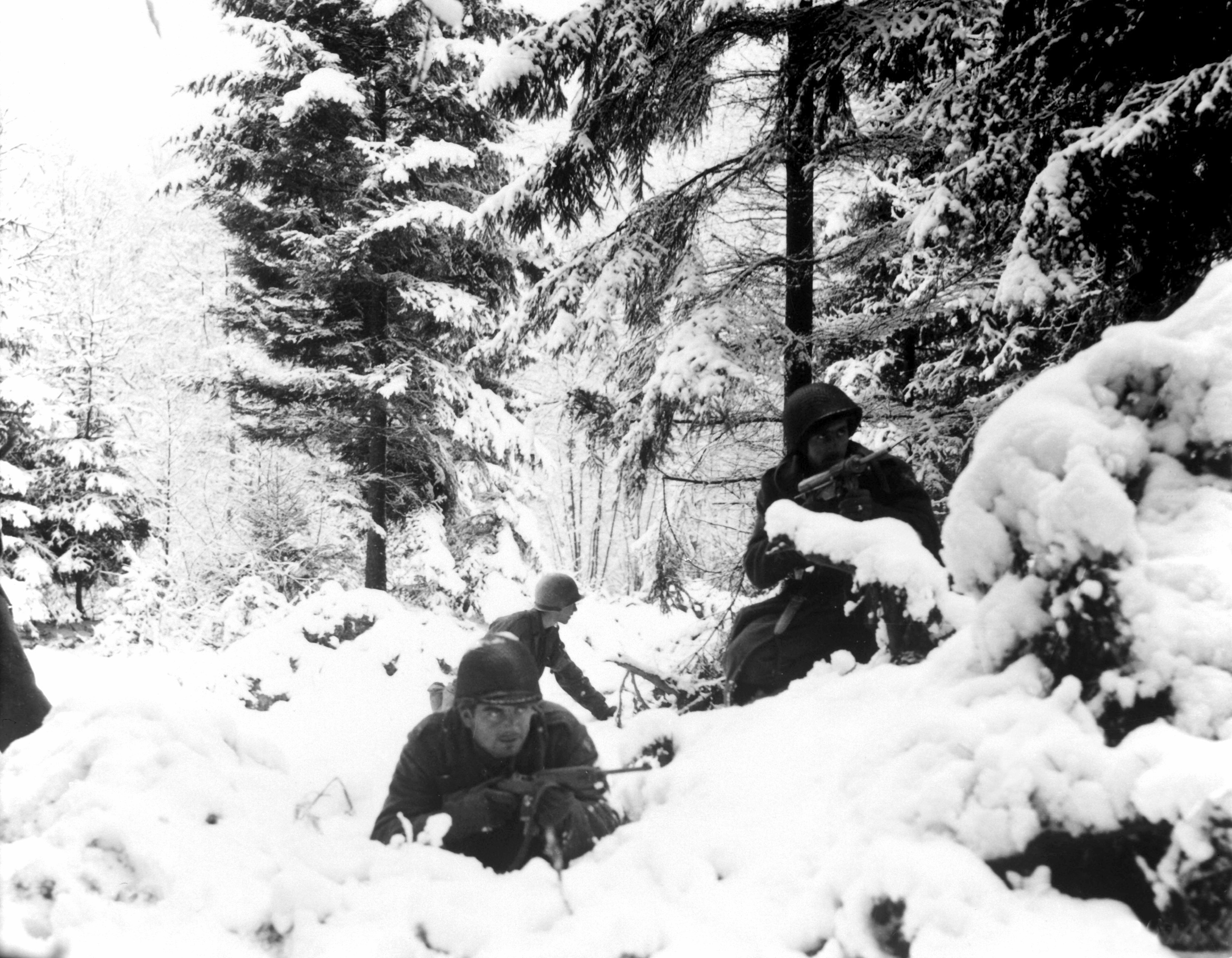
American soldiers taking up defensive positions in the Ardennes during the Battle of the Bulge.

The hedgehog defence is a military tactic in which a defending force creates multiple mutually supporting strongpoints ("hedgehogs") in a defence in depth, designed to sap the strength and break the momentum of an attack. The hedgehogs are designed to be both strong in defence, and thus expensive for an attacker to assault, and capable of mounting counterattacks. The intention is that the attacker will instead bypass them. This will divide his front, expose his forward units to enfilading fire as they pass between hedgehogs followed by attack from the rear when they have passed them, and leave his rear echelons and lines of communication open to counterattack.

== Description ==
In warfare, it is a military tactic to defend against a mobile armoured attack, or blitzkrieg. The defenders deploy in depth in heavily fortified positions suitable for all-around defence. The attackers can penetrate between the "hedgehogs", but each position continues to fight on when it is surrounded. That keeps large numbers of attacking troops tied up, attacking the well-defended strongpoints, and it allows the defenders to counterattack against the units that bypass the strongpoints with their own armored reserves, by cutting them off from their supporting elements.

== Battle of Laupen ==
The Bernese/Swiss army used the hedgehog formation against a Freiburg force at the Battle of Laupen in 1339.

== World War II ==
In the interwar period Rommel had mentioned the hedgehog as a protective tactic used during rest periods, at platoon and company level, in World War I. Use of a pattern of hedgehogs, comprising larger units and forming a defence in depth, was proposed by General Maxime Weygand in 1940 during the Battle of France. However, Allied forces were unable to apply the tactic before they sustained heavy losses; the remaining French forces applied it but were successfully bypassed, and France signed an armistice with victorious Germany a few weeks later.

On the Eastern Front, the German army used the tactic successfully during the Soviet winter advances, notably in the Battle of Moscow in 1941, in the Second Rzhev-Sychevka Offensive in November 1942, and in the battle around Orel during Operation Saturn in February 1943. The Germans adopted the additional feature commonly associated with hedgehog defence, resupply of the strongpoints by air.

Particularly in the winter of 1941–42, the advanced "hedgehogs" effectively surrounded by the Soviets, such as the Demyansk pocket, were supplied mainly by air. Although casualties were heavy, the strongpoints held up large numbers of attacking Soviet troops and prevented them from being deployed elsewhere; the successful defence of the Demyansk pocket, for example, helped stem the Soviet counteroffensive following the Battle of Moscow. Although aerial resupply reduced reliance on vulnerable ground transport, it inflicted an enormous strain on the Luftwaffe. The successful holding of forward positions in the battles led Adolf Hitler to insist, for the remainder of the war, for static positions to be held to the last man. However, the increasing weakness of the Luftwaffe and the improved combat capabilities of the Soviet Air Force made resupply of isolated strongpoints by air difficult. In particular, Hitler had hoped that the surrounded Stalingrad could be turned into a giant hedgehog, tying up vast numbers of Soviet troops.

After the Battle of Kursk in 1943, the German Army lacked the essential components of the tactic, the mobile armoured reserve and an air combat capability necessary to secure local air superiority for keeping open aerial supply corridors, thus losing the war.

The British Army used "brigade boxes" during the Western Desert Campaign, the boxes consisted of reinforced brigade-sized forces of all arms, protected by barbed wire and with the space between boxes covered by mine fields, defence of the boxes was centered around mutually supporting field artillery and anti-tank guns, which covered the mine fields and the approaches to neighbouring boxes. In the jungles of Burma during the Burma Campaign, the British and Indian armies formed forward defensive positions called "battalion boxes", which consisted of battalion sized forces that would be supplied from the air if surrounded.

== Post-World War II ==
Following the end of World War II, the tactic was successfully used in Southeast Asia by the French against the Việt Minh in the Battle of Nà Sản. The French suffered a disaster in the Battle of Dien Bien Phu, when General Võ Nguyên Giáp deployed unexpectedly-heavy concentrations of anti-aircraft artillery around the French garrison and successfully disrupted aerial resupply. Later, hedgehog defence was central in the US Marines' successful defence of Khe Sanh against the PAVN.

A notable example of modern hedgehog defence is the Battle of Vukovar during the Croatian War of independence. A small, ill-armed but determined Croatian resistance kept a larger, heavily equipped but less-motivated Yugoslav Army at bay, buying precious time for the fledgling Republic of Croatia to organize its own armed forces.

Another, ultimately less successful, application was the Iraqi military strategy during the first Gulf War to fortify Kuwait and create an extensive "hedgehog" defensive position. The forward defensive positions were staffed by its elite Republican Guard. The dug-in forces complemented in-depth defence features, such as minefields, tank traps, fire trenches, and other elements of trench and bunker warfare.

== See also ==
- 150th Infantry Brigade (United Kingdom)
- Chaco War
- Fire support base
