= Reconnaissance by fire =

Military tactical doctrine

Reconnaissance by fire (recon by fire), also known as speculative fire, is a warfare tactic used in which military forces may fire on likely enemy positions to provoke a reaction, which confirms the presence and the position of enemy forces.

== World War II ==
Reconnaissance by fire was widely adopted by the Allies against the Axis in the European theater of World War II. Previously armored units would typically advance in column behind light armored scouting units. At the same time infantry would be present to provide support in the event of ambush by German panzerfaust teams. This method proved too slow to keep pressure on retreating enemy forces. Instead, US armored columns continued to advance at speed, training cannon and machine guns alternately to fire to cover both the left and the right of the axis of advance. The column would fire its weapons more or less continuously into any suspected enemy positions as they appeared, suppressing and distracting the aim of enemy gunners and antitank teams. Supply echelon convoys using trucks equipped with .50-cal. M2 Browning machine guns also used the tactic when traveling through areas not completely cleared of enemy forces.

== Vietnam War ==
During the Battle of Ia Drang in the Vietnam War, Lieutenant Colonel Hal Moore, a US Army battalion commander, observed that his men had a surplus of ammunition. He subsequently issued orders for his soldiers to simultaneously open fire on any suspicious targets. This coordinated barrage created the impression among a group of infiltrating enemy soldiers that they had been detected, prompting them to charge at the American forces. As a result, they were ultimately defeated.

== See also ==
- List of established military terms
- List of military strategies and concepts
- List of military tactics
