= All round defence =

Defensive fighting position

All-around defense or perimeter defense is a type of defensive fighting position intended to give military units the ability to repel attacks from any direction.

The positioning of the outer defensive fighting positions of a unit, is circular or triangular, from a bird's-eye view.

One version consists of soldiers forming a wide circle around the soldier in charge (and radioman etc.) with a spacing typically of 3–4 metres between each person (on the circle's circumference).

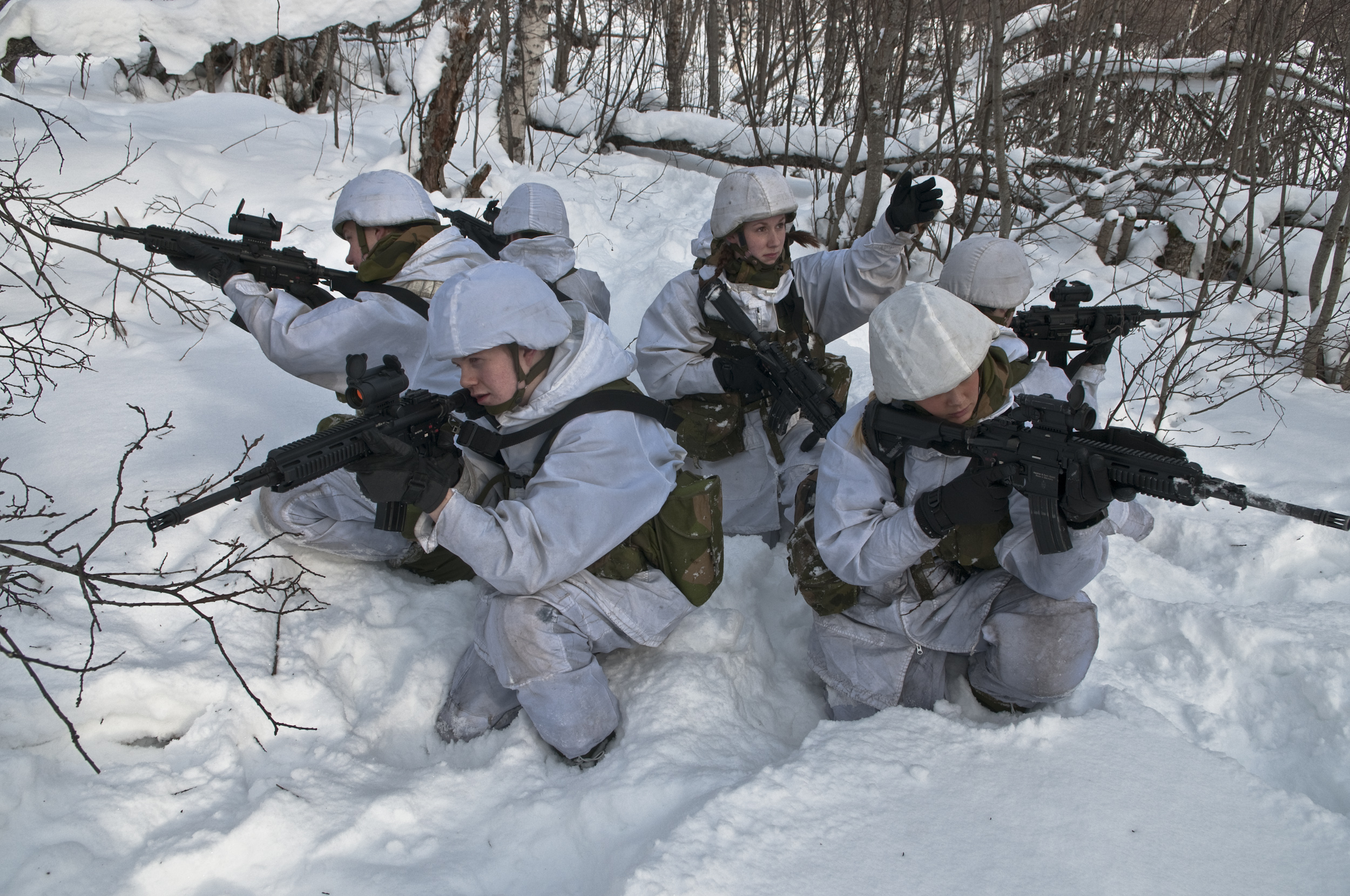
A fireteam from the Norwegian Army 2nd Battalion in a defensive formation.

When a group of soldiers relocate as a part of a defensive operation, a perimeter defense can be temporarily maintained without cover.

== See also ==
- Defensive fighting position
- Infantry tactics
- List of military tactics
- Fortification
