= Platform envelopment =

Platform envelopment is a strategy in which one platform provider enters another platform’s market by combining its own functionality with that of the target, creating a bundled multi-platform offering. Markets that evolve rapidly are especially rich in envelopment opportunities, and firms in these industries face a continuous risk of being displaced or rendered obsolete.

An example is the convergence of mobile phones and portable media players, which were once separate markets but gradually merged into multifunctional devices. When a stand-alone business faces an envelopment attack, its strategic options are often limited to adapting its business model or selling to the attacker.

One well-documented case involves RealPlayer, which had established a two-sided market in the streaming video sector. RealNetworks subsidized consumers while charging content providers for its streaming software. Microsoft launched an envelopment attack by integrating streaming server software with its Windows NT operating system. This bundling strategy reduced the incentive for content providers to continue paying Real, as Microsoft’s platform was already embedded in Windows and tied to the widely distributed Windows Media Player.

== Typology of Envelopment Attacks ==
The two different networks can be complements, substitutes and functionally unrelated. The relationship between the two networks is the basis on how the attack is launched.

=== Envelopment of Complements ===
A network market consists of several players operating in various adjacent layers. In this kind of attack a player tries to gain a dominant position in the adjacent layer by bundling the services the adjacent layer player provides in its own offerings.

=== Envelopment of Weak Substitutes ===
Price a person is willing to pay for a bundle consisting of two perfect substitutes will be the one which he uses either of them and hence there would be no value for a firm to envelope a platform which acts as a perfect substitute for its own offering. However, there is a value to be created when we have in question a set of weak substitutes.

=== Envelopment of Unrelated Platforms ===
The platforms previously meant for a different usage begin to converge as the common set of users begin to rise. Such is the case with mobile phones and video game devices which were used for distinct purposes but the digital platforms available today have converged all such usages into one.
