= Individual movement techniques =

Military tactic

Individual movement techniques or IMTs (also known as infantry minor tactics in Australia) are the most basic tactics that are employed at the fireteam, squad, section or platoon level. They are similar in most modern armies.

In most situations except static defense, IMTs are based on the principle of fire and movement. That is, firing and moving as fire teams, with one supporting team suppressing the enemy whilst the other moves either toward the enemy or to a more favourable position. The movement is often only 5–10 metres per move. When closing on the enemy position, the team breaks down into pairs for better angles of suppression, and this technique is referred to as "pepper-potting" (British/Commonwealth). The United States Army focuses on the three individual movement techniques of high crawl, low crawl, and 3-5 second rush.

Most IMTs are taught in the form of a battle drill, a series of choreographed steps that occur automatically in reaction to certain stimuli, such as sighting an enemy to the front, or being fired upon by an enemy from the flank. The initial stages of the drill are always the same and therefore action does not require full appraisal of the situation. Such stimulus-response training allows coordinated responses without the need for direct orders.

In combat, this allows the first few moments of the engagement to occur almost automatically and gives the soldiers a way to respond appropriately and predictably while the unit commander evaluates the situation prior to issuing orders.

== See also ==
- Tactic (method)
