= Squadron (aviation) =

Military aviation unit

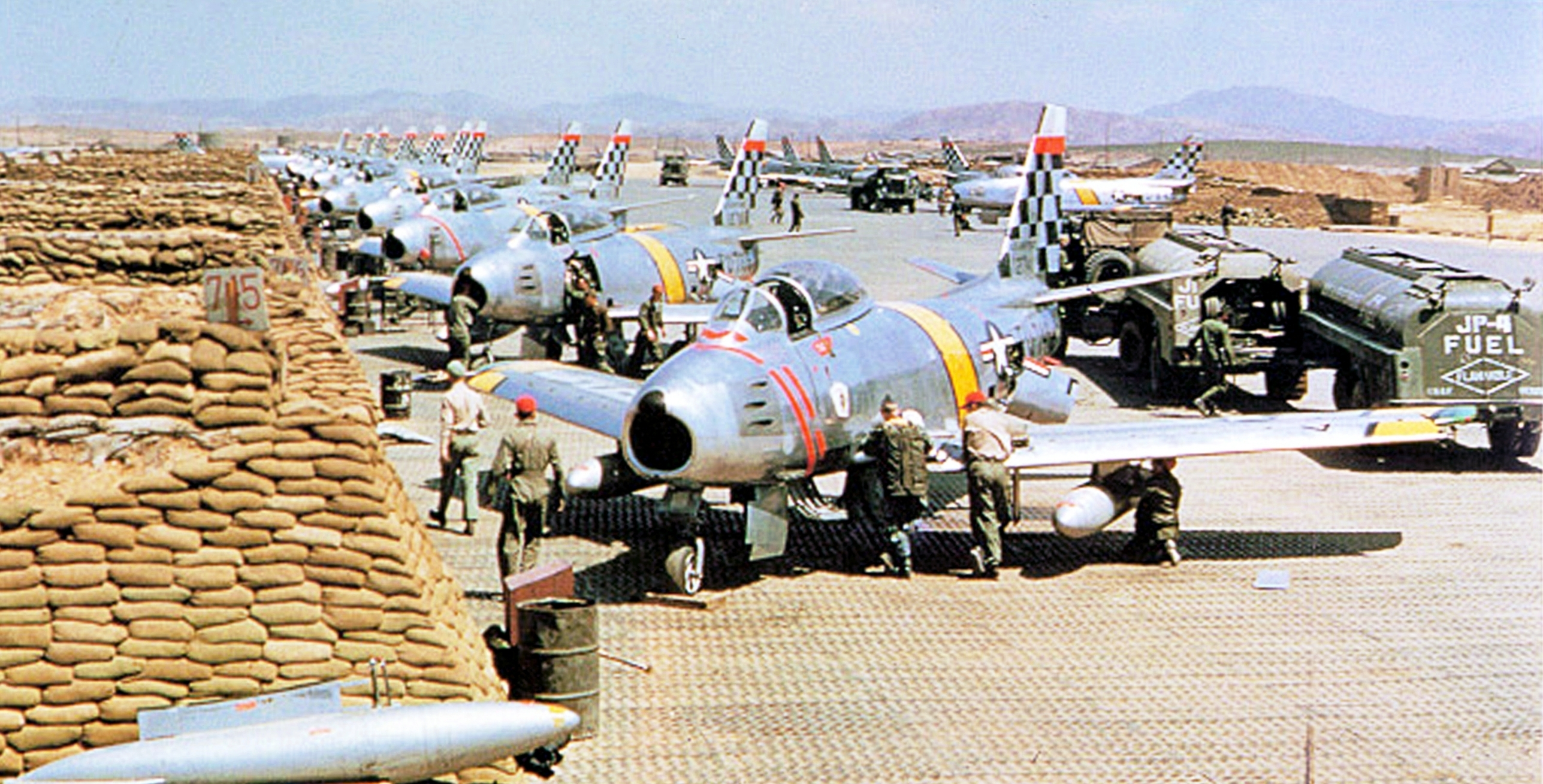
A United States Air Force F-86 Sabre squadron during the Korean War, 1951

A squadron in an air force, or naval or army aviation service, is a unit comprising a number of military aircraft and their aircrews, usually of the same type, typically with 12 to 24 aircraft, sometimes divided into three or four flights, depending on aircraft type and air force.

In most armed forces, two or more squadrons will form a group or a wing. Some military forces (including the United States Air Force, United States Space Force, French Air and Space Force, Royal Air Force, German Air Force, Royal Netherlands Air Force, Belgian Air Force and Republic of Singapore Air Force) also use the term "squadron" for non-flying ground units (e.g. radar squadrons, missile squadrons, air defense squadrons, aircraft maintenance squadrons, security forces squadrons, civil engineering squadrons, range operations squadrons, range management squadrons, weather squadrons, medical squadrons, etc.).

== Comparative organization ==
Organizational structure of flying units in selected NATO countries, by relative size
Size group	British and USN	USAF and USMC	USSF	Canadian	French AAE	German Air Force	Italian Air Force	NATO rank level of general or commanding officer
8		Air division (no longer used)		Air division Division aérienne		Luftwaffendivision (no longer used)	Divisione aerea	OF-7
7	Group	Wing	Delta (OF-5)	Group; Groupe aérien (no longer used)	Brigade Aérienne		Brigata aerea	OF-5, or OF-6
6	Wing	Group	Delta (OF-5)	Wing; Escadre	Escadre	Geschwader (OF-5)	Stormo	OF-4, OF-5, or OF-6
5	Squadron	Squadron	Squadron (OF-4)	Squadron; Escadron	Escadron	Gruppe (OF-4)	Gruppo	OF-3 or OF-4
4	Flight	Flight		Flight; Escadrille	Escadrille	Staffel (OF-3)	Squadriglia	OF-2 or OF-3
3	Flight	Element/Section		Section	Section	Schwarm / Kette	sezione	OF-1 or OF-2

== Germany ==
In World War I, the Imperial German Army used the term Squadron (staffel), whereas the Austro-Hungarian armed forces and the Swiss Army used the term company. In the modern German Air Force, a flying staffel is a battalion-equivalent, while a ground based support staffel is a company-equivalent. One such example are the air base defence units, which are squadrons (German, plural: Staffeln) formed into battalions. The ground based missile air defence units are also company- (in this case battery-)equivalent squadrons (staffeln).

== Sweden ==
The Swedish Air Force adopted naval-like traditions in its formative years and for that historical reason calls its squadrons divisions (plural: divisioner). They are grouped into air flotillas (plural: flygflottiljer). During the Cold War the Swedish Army, Navy and Air Force each had their own integral helicopter arms. After the end of it in line with the mid-90s force reduction and reforms they were fused into the Swedish Armed Forces Helicopter Wing as a service, independent from the three main armed forces branches. The Helicopter Wing adopted the term skvadron from the former Swedish Army Aviation for its units, which is squadron in its army company-equivalent meaning. In the early 2000s, the Swedish Air Force absorbed the Helicopter Wing as its fourth combat air wing. Unlike the US Air Force, where the name of the base and the units stationed at that base are not related to each other, the name of the wing (flotilla) is in general considered synonymous with the air base where the unit is stationed. For example, the air base where the F 10 wing is stationed (in Ängelholm) is commonly referred to as F 10 even though it is the name of the tactical unit. In general, this only applies as long as a wing is stationed at the base. Case in point is Uppsala-Ärna air base, an active military airport but since the tactical unit located there has been disbanded it is no longer referred to as F 16. These naming conventions have been inherited from the navy where Swedish military aviation has its roots.

== United Kingdom and Commonwealth ==
During the infant years of combat aviation in World War I and specifically with the trench stalemate at the front military aircraft partially took over the reconnaissance role from the cavalry. With that in mind the British Royal Flying Corps adopted the squadron nomenclature. After the fusion of the Royal Flying Corps and the Royal Naval Air Service into an independent Royal Air Force, the new armed forces branch introduced its own system of ranks, with the commanders of squadrons becoming squadron leaders.

The rapid sophistication in technology and combat tactics has led to increased requirements and qualifications of the officers in command positions and the commanders of RAF flying squadrons were upgraded in the post-World War II period from squadron leaders to wing commanders. Today RAF flying squadrons are battalion-equivalents, while combat and combat service support ground squadrons such as communications or administrative squadrons are company-equivalents and still usually commanded by squadron leaders.

During the Second World War, a British fighter squadron was a fighting strength of 12 aircraft; this was achieved with about 16 aircraft and 20 pilots assigned to each squadron so the full force could be flown at any time. The squadron was subdivided into two flights - A and B, and then into sections of two or three aircraft - Red and Yellow, Blue and Green - for operations.

Flying units in the Fleet Air Arm and Army Air Corps are also called squadrons. In the latter they are company-equivalent units, divided into flights and grouped into regiments.

In the Air Training Corps of the United Kingdom and many Commonwealth nations, a squadron is a group of cadets who parade regularly.

== United States ==
In the United States Air Force, the squadron is the principal organizational unit. An aggregation of two or more USAF squadrons will be designated as a group and two or more groups will be designated as a wing.

USAF squadrons may be flying units composed of pilots and flight crews, with designations such as fighter squadron, bomb squadron, or airlift squadron. Fighter squadrons may support between 18 and 24 aircraft, while squadrons flying larger aircraft (e.g., bomber, cargo, reconnaissance) may support fewer aircraft. However, non-flying units also exist at the squadron level, such as missile squadrons, aircraft maintenance squadrons, intelligence squadrons, aerospace medicine squadrons, security forces squadrons, civil engineering squadrons and force support squadrons, as well as numerous other examples.

USAF flying squadrons are typically commanded by an aeronautically rated officer in the rank of lieutenant colonel, although some particularly large squadrons, such as the 414th Combat Training Squadron that manages Red Flag training at Nellis AFB, Nevada will be commanded by an aeronautically rated officer in the rank of full colonel. Non-flying squadrons are also usually commanded by an officer in the rank of lieutenant colonel, but some may also be commanded by officers in the rank of major.

In contrast to the organizational structure of United States Air Force units, where flying squadrons are separate from non-flying squadrons tasked with administrative, aircraft maintenance, or other support functions, flying squadrons in naval aviation in the United States (e.g., United States Navy and United States Marine Corps) typically contain both embedded administrative support functions and organizational level aircraft maintenance functions, plus all their associated personnel, as part of the total squadron manning. With few exceptions, oversight of the majority of these non-flying functions is assigned to the squadron's naval aviators and naval flight officers as their "ground job" in addition to their regular flying duties.

With few exceptions, most U.S. Navy flying squadrons are commanded by aeronautically designated officers in the rank of commander. Exceptions are primarily the Fleet Replacement Squadrons (FRS), which are often, though not always, commanded by aeronautically designated captains. Commanding officers (COs) of U.S. Navy flying squadrons other than FRS units will be assisted by an executive officer (XO) of the same rank who functions as a second-in-command and who will eventually "fleet up" and relieve the CO as the next CO.

In United States Marine Corps Aviation, in addition to flying units that are patterned in similar fashion to their U.S. Navy counterparts, the nomenclature "squadron" in the Marine Corps is also used to designate all battalion-equivalent, aviation support organizations. These squadrons include: wing headquarters, tactical air command, air control, air support, aviation logistics, wing support, and wing communications squadrons. In contrast to their USN counterparts, USMC flying squadrons and aviation support squadrons, while having a commanding officer (CO) at the lieutenant colonel level, may not have an equivalent rank executive officer (XO), but are moving more toward the USN model. USMC aviation (Flying) squadron XO's are aeronautically designated officers in the rank of Lt.Col or Major.

Also in contrast to USAF flying squadrons, most tactical sea-based and land-based U.S. Naval Aviation squadrons (USN and USMC), vice training squadrons and test and evaluation squadrons, usually do not have more than 12 aircraft authorized/assigned at any one time. Exceptions are USN helicopter mine countermeasures squadrons (17 MH-53), USMC "composite" medium tilt-rotor squadrons assigned afloat as the Aviation Combat Element (ACE) of a Marine Expeditionary Unit (MEU), (12 MV-22s, 6 AH-1s, 4 CH-53s, 3 UH-1s, and 6 AV-8s). Other squadrons with a large number of Primary Aircraft Assigned (PAA) include Marine heavy helicopter squadrons (16 CH-53s), Marine light/attack helicopter squadrons (18 AH-1s and 9 UH-1s), and Marine attack squadrons (16 AV-8s).

Although part of U.S. naval aviation, United States Coast Guard aviation units are centered on an air station or air facility versus a squadron or group/wing organizational structure. The one exception to this is the Coast Guard's Helicopter Interdiction Squadron (HITRON), which is engaged primarily in counter-narcotics (CN) interdiction operations.

In the United States Army Aviation Branch, flying units may be organized in battalions or squadrons (the latter for air cavalry only) reporting to an aviation brigade. Aircraft maintenance activities are typically assigned to an aviation maintenance company or element in the battalion or brigade.

In the U.S. Civil Air Patrol (CAP), a squadron is the basic administrative unit. As the official civilian auxiliary of the U.S. Air Force, CAP follows the USAF organizational model.

== Other countries ==
An escadron is the equivalent unit in France's French Air and Space Force (Armée de l'air et de l'espace). It is normally subdivided into escadrilles of eight aircraft. The Spanish Air and Space Force and some air forces of other Spanish-speaking countries follow that tradition (with a squadron called an escuadron and a flight called an escuadrilla), as does the Brazilian Air Force with esquadrão and esquadrilha respectively.

The Royal Canadian Air Force and the Belgian Air Component on the other hand use escadrille as the equivalent of a squadron. The Italian Air Force uses gruppo (group) to denominate its squadrons, as does the Chilean Air Force (grupo de aviación). The Portuguese Air Force (esquadra) and the Polish Air Force (eskadra taktyczna, 'tactical squadron') use the term squadron with its etymology originating from the naval and not the army meaning. The Czech Air Force and the Slovak Air Force use the generic term Letka as the squadron equivalent. The Turkish Air Force (filo) and the Hellenic Air Force (μοιρα αεροπορικής, mira aeroporikis, 'aviation squadron') use the squadron denomination originating from the army term. The Royal Norwegian Air Force use the skvadron term also originating from the army term. So does the Hungarian Air Force with repülőszázad (Hungarian for 'aircraft squadron' or 'flying squadron'; the cavalry company-equivalent term is század).

Many Eastern European countries use the term originating from the French word escadrille:

- Russian Air Force – Эскадрилья, eskadril'ya,
- Belarusian Air Force – Эскадрыльля, eskadryil'ya,
- Ukrainian Air Force – Ескадрилья, eskadril'ya,
- Romanian Air Force – escadrilă,
- Bulgarian Air Force – Ескадрила, eskadrila,
- Serbian Air Force – Ескадрила, eskadrila,
- Croatian Air Force – eskadrila.

The Royal Danish Air Force uses eskadrille, also originating from the French escadrille.

== See also ==
- Naval air squadron
- Flight (military unit)
