= Military organization =

Structuring of armed forces of a state

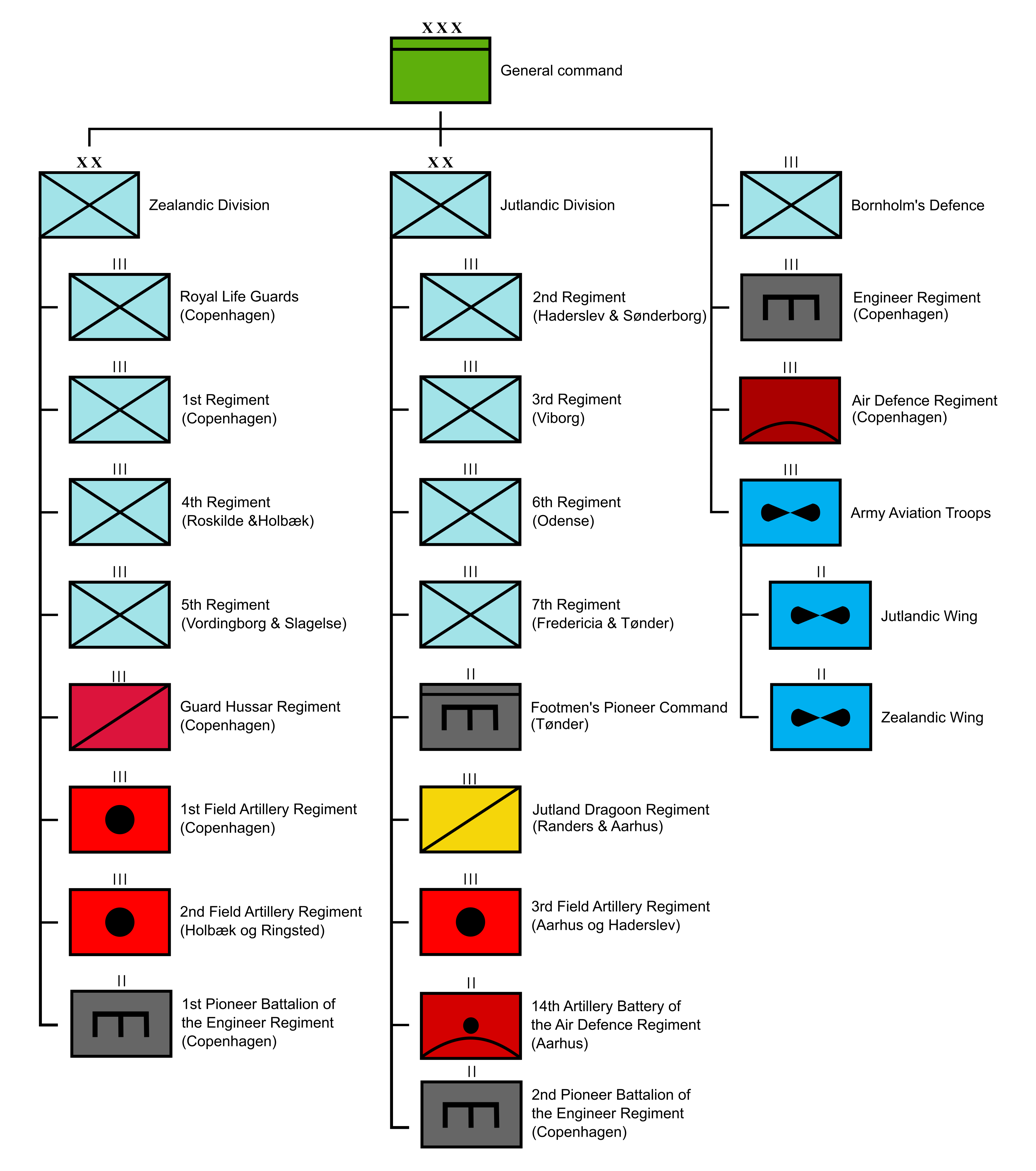
Organization chart of the Royal Danish Army, April 1940

Military organization is the structuring of the armed forces of a state so as to offer such military capability as a national defense policy may require. Formal military organization tends to use hierarchical forms (see below under "Modern hierarchy" for terminology and approximate troop-strength per hierarchical unit).

Some countries include paramilitary forces in their armed forces, though not considered military. Armed forces that are not a part of military or paramilitary organizations, such as insurgent forces, often emulate military organizations, or use the terminologies of military organization.

== History ==
The use of formalized ranks in a hierarchical structure came into widespread use with the Roman Army. The Roman Army was organized into legions, each comprising around 5000 soldiers and led by a legate. Each legion was further divided into centuries which were led by centurions.

In modern times, executive control, management and administration of military organization is typically undertaken by governments through a government department within the structure of public administration, often known as a ministry of defence or department of defense. These in turn manage military branches that themselves command formations and units specialising in combat, combat support and combat-service support.

== Executive control, management and administration ==
The usually civilian or partly civilian executive control over the national military organization is exercised in democracies by an elected political leader as a member of the government's cabinet, usually known as a minister of defence. In presidential systems, such as the United States, the president is the commander-in-chief, and the cabinet-level defense minister is second in command. Subordinated to that position are often secretaries for specific major operational divisions of the armed forces as a whole, such as those that provide general support services to the military, including their dependants.

Then there are the heads of specific departmental agencies responsible for the provision and management of specific skill- and knowledge-based services such as strategic advice, capability development assessment, or military science provision of research, and design and development of technologies. Within each departmental agency will be found administrative branches responsible for further agency business specialization work.

== Military branches ==
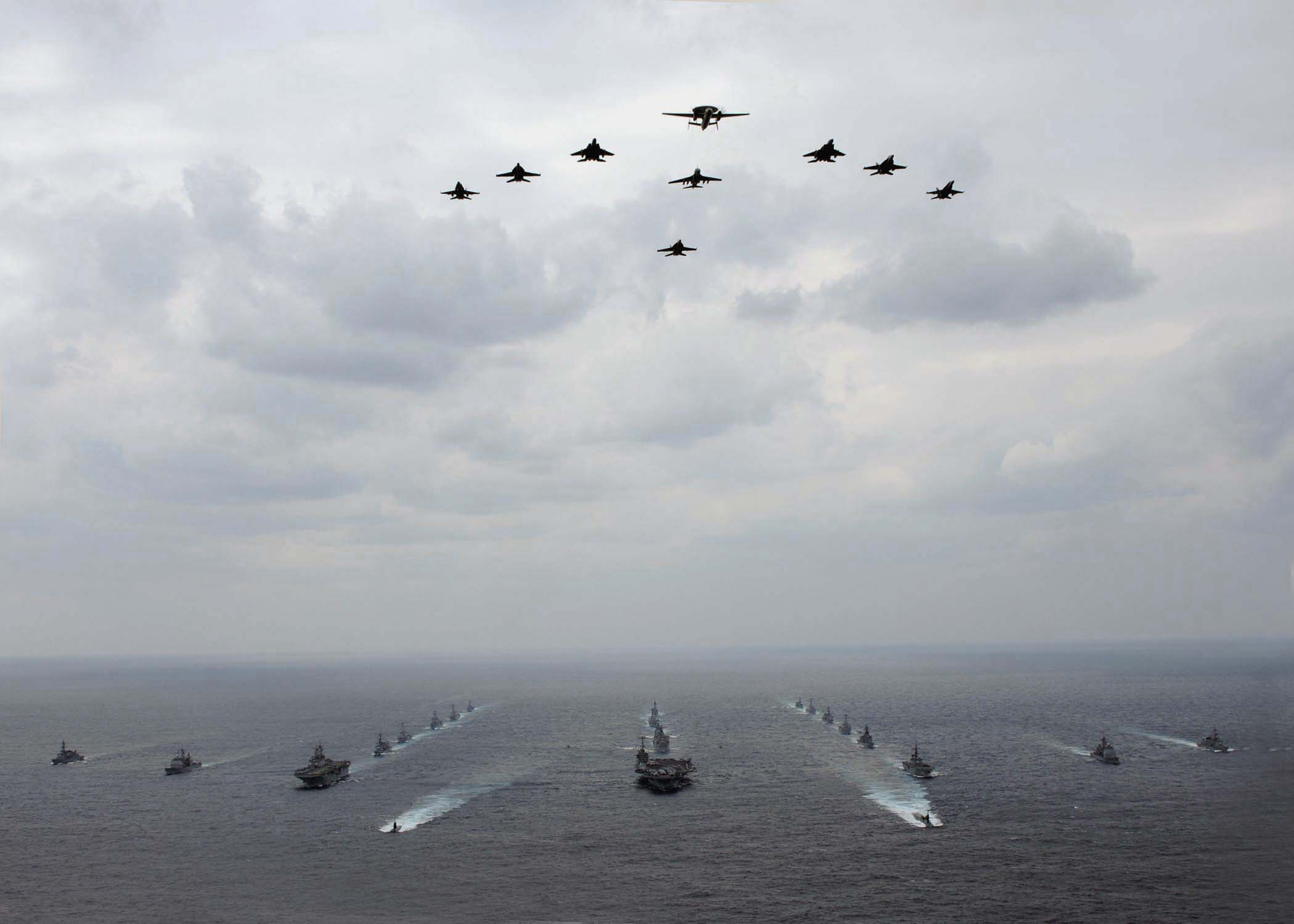
A mixed aircraft and ship formation of military vehicles during an exercise with USN and JASDF vehicles.

In most countries, the armed forces are divided into three military branches (also service, armed service, or military service): army, navy, and air force.

Many countries have a variation on the standard model of three basic military branches. Some nations also organize their cyber force, emergencies service, medical service, military logistics, space force, marines, and special forces such as commandos or airborne forces as independent armed services. A nation's border guard or coast guard may also be an independent branch of its military, although in many nations border guard or coast guard is a civil law enforcement agency. A number of countries have no navy, for geographical reasons such as being landlocked.

In larger armed forces, the cultures between the different branches of the armed forces can be quite different.

Most smaller countries have a single organization that encompasses all armed forces employed by the country in question. Armies of developing countries tend to consist primarily of infantry, while developed countries armies tend to have larger units manning expensive equipment and only a fraction of personnel in infantry units.

In western militaries, a joint force is defined as a unit or formation comprising combat power from two or more branches of the military.

=== Internal security forces ===
Gendarmeries, military police and security forces, including equivalents such as paramilitary forces, militia, internal troops and police tactical unit, are an internal security service common in most of the world, but uncommon in countries with English common law histories where civil police are employed to enforce the law, and there are tight restrictions on how the armed forces may be used to assist. (Note: In the United States it is a common misunderstanding that all their armed forces are totally prohibited from doing so by the Posse Comitatus Act. The Act, which reserves to Congress the power to employ federal military force to enforce law and order, does not apply to the Coast Guard which has a clear law enforcement role in its peacetime status. When under state control the National Guard is also excluded from the Posse Comitatus Act. The Insurrection Act specifically permits the president to use federal military force to restore public order in extreme emergency situations: the Act was implemented during the "Rodney King Riots" in Los Angeles.)

== Commands, formations, and units ==
It is common, at least in the European and North American militaries, to refer to the building blocks of a military as commands, formations, and units.

In a military context, a command is a collection of units and formations under the control of a single officer, although during World War II a command was also a name given to a battlegroup in the United States Army. In general, it is an administrative and executive strategic headquarters that is responsible to the national government or the national military headquarters. It is not uncommon for a nation's services to each consist of their own command (such as Land Component, Air Component, Naval Component, and Medical Component in the Belgian Army), but this does not preclude the existence of commands that are not service-based.

A formation is defined by the U.S. Department of Defense as "two or more aircraft, ships, or units proceeding together under a commander". Fomin in the Great Soviet Encyclopedia emphasised its combined-arms nature: "Formations are those military organisations which are formed from different speciality Arms and Services troop units to create a balanced, combined combat force. The formations only differ in their ability to achieve different scales of application of force to achieve different strategic, operational and tactical goals and mission objectives." It is a composite military organization that includes a mixture of integrated and operationally attached sub-units, and is usually combat-capable. Examples of formations include divisions, brigades, battalions, wings, etc. Formation may also refer to tactical formation, the physical arrangement or disposition of troops and weapons. Examples of formation in such usage include pakfront, panzerkeil, testudo formation, etc.

A typical unit is a homogeneous military organization (either combat, combat-support or non-combat in capability) that includes service personnel predominantly from a single arm of service, or a branch of service, and its administrative and command functions are self-contained. Any unit subordinate to another unit is considered its sub-unit or minor unit. It is not uncommon in the United States for unit and formation to be used synonymously. In Commonwealth practice, formation is not used for smaller organizations such as battalions, which are instead called "units", and their constituent platoons or companies are referred to as sub-units. In the Commonwealth, formations are divisions, brigades, etc.

Different armed forces, and even different branches of service of the armed forces, may use the same name to denote different types of organizations. An example is the "squadron". In most navies a squadron is a formation of several ships; in most air forces it is a unit; in the U.S. Army it is a battalion-sized cavalry unit; and in Commonwealth armies a squadron is a company-sized sub-unit.

== Table of organization and equipment ==
A table of organization and equipment (TOE or TO&E) is a document published by the U.S. Army Force Management Support Agency that prescribes the organization, manning, and equipage of units from divisional size and down, but also including the headquarters of Corps and Armies.

It also provides information on the mission and capabilities of a unit as well as the unit's current status. A general TOE is applicable to a type of unit (for instance, infantry) rather than a specific unit (the 3rd Infantry Division). In this way, all units of the same branch (such as infantry) follow the same structural guidelines.

== Modern hierarchy ==
=== Army ===
The following table gives an overview of some of the terms used to describe army hierarchy in armed forces across the world. Whilst it is recognized that there are differences between armies of different nations, many resemble British or American models, or both. However, many military units and formations go back in history for a long time, and were devised by various military thinkers throughout history.

For example, in 1800 in France during the Napoleonic Wars, Napoleon Bonaparte introduced the modern corps as a more flexible tactical grouping of two or more divisions.

NATO Symbol	Name	Nature	Strength	Constituent units	Commander or leader
	Combatant Command or equivalent region (Note: In the United States this command is termed an army region.) theater	Command	1,000,000–10,000,000	4+ army groups	OF-10: field marshal OF-9: general, army general or colonel general
	army group or equivalent front	Command	400,000–1,000,000	2+ armies	OF-10 field marshal OF-9: general, army general, or colonel general
	field army	Command	100,000–200,000	2–4 corps	OF-10: field marshal OF-9: general, army general, or colonel general OF-8: Lieutenant General
	corps	Formation	20,000–60,000	2+ divisions	OF-9: general or army general (Note: Some countries such as Brazil.); OF-8: lieutenant general, corps general, or colonel general (Note: Eastern Bloc); OF-7: major general (Note: People's Liberation Army Ground Force (PLAGF))
	division	Formation	6,000–25,000	2–8 brigades or regiments	OF-8: lieutenant general OF-8 or OF-7: divisional general OF-7: major general or OF-6: senior colonel OF-7: Brigadier general
	brigade	Formation	3,000–5,000	2+ regiments or groups, or 3–8 battalions or equivalent	OF-7: major general OF-7 or OF-6: brigade general OF-6: brigadier, brigadier general, senior colonel OF-5: colonel
	regiment	Unit	1,000–3,000	2+ battalions or equivalent	OF-5: colonel
	battalion or equivalent regiment (some countries for some arms only) squadron (US Cavalry) squadron (some countries for aviation)	Unit	300–1,000	2–6 sub-units (companies or equivalent)	OF-4: lieutenant colonel
	company or equivalent artillery battery squadron (some countries for some arms only); U.S. cavalry troop	Unit or Subunit	100–250	2–8 platoons or equivalent	OF-3: major OF-2: captain OR-9: chief warrant officer
	staffel or echelon	Sub-subunit	50–90	2 platoons/troops or 6–10 sections	OF-2: captain or staff captain OR-8: warrant officer or master warrant officer
	platoon or equivalent troop (some countries for some arms only)	Sub-subunit	20–50	2+ Section, or vehicles	OF-1: first or second lieutenant OR-7: warrant officer
	section or patrol	–	12–24	2–3 squads or 3–6 fireteams	OR-6: staff sergeant OR-5: sergeant
	squad	–	6–12	2–3 fireteams or 1+ cell	OR-5: sergeant OR-4: corporal
	fireteam or crew	–	2–4	n/a	OR-3: lance corporal to OR-5: sergeant OR-2: private first class

Some structures may omit rungs in the ladder: for example, typically NATO forces skip from battalion to brigade. Likewise, only large military organizations could have commands at the top levels; and different armies and countries also use traditional names, creating considerable confusion: for example, a British or Canadian armored regiment (battalion) is divided into squadrons (companies) and troops (platoons), whereas an American cavalry squadron (battalion) is divided into troops (companies) and platoons. In the French system (used by many African countries) the company is divided into sections (platoons) composed of 3 x "groupes de combat" of 7 soldiers, plus a group of vehicle crews and a HQ that includes 2 x snipers.

Army, army group, region, and area group are all large formations that vary significantly between armed forces in size and hierarchy position. While divisions were the traditional level at which support-elements (field artillery, hospital, logistics and maintenance, etc.) were added to the unit structure, since World War II, many brigades now have such support units, and since the 1980s, regiments also have been receiving support elements. A regiment with such support elements is called a "regimental team" in US military parlance, or a "battlegroup" in UK and other forces. Canadian Army doctrine also includes the combat team, which is a company of infantry augmented with tanks, or a squadron of tanks augmented with infantry, or the combination of a full company of infantry with a full squadron of tanks.

During World War II the Soviet Red Army used the same basic organizational structure. However, at the start of the conflict many units were greatly underpowered and their size was actually one level below on the ladder that is usually used elsewhere; for example, a division in the early-WWII Red Army would have been about the size of most countries regiments or brigades. Soviet (and Russian) militaries have a tradition of certain "separate" or "autonomous" (Russian: отдельный) units which can operate (outside the usual chain of command) at the behest of a higher authority — forces may appear (for example) as part of a separate army), a separate division (Russian: отдельная дивизия), a separate brigade (Russian: отдельная бригада), a separate regiment or a separate batallion. At the top of the ladder, what other militaries would call an "army group", the Red Army called a "front". By contrast, during the same period the German Wehrmacht army groups, particularly on the Eastern Front (such as Army Group Centre), significantly exceeded the above numbers, and were more comparable with the Soviet Strategic Directions.

=== Navy ===
Naval organization at the flotilla level and higher is less commonly abided by, as ships operate in smaller or larger groups in various situations that may change at a moment's notice. However, there is some common terminology used throughout navies to communicate the general concept of how many vessels might be in a unit.

Navies are generally organized into groups for a specific purpose, usually strategic, and these organizational groupings appear and disappear frequently based on the conditions and demands placed upon a navy. This contrasts with army organization where units remain static, with the same men and equipment, over long periods of time.

Unit Name	Vessel types	No. of Vessels	Officer in command
Combatant Command (US) or Navy or Admiralty	All vessels in a navy	2+ Fleets	Fleet Admiral, Admiral of the Fleet, Grand Admiral or Admiral
Fleet	All vessels in an ocean or general region	2+ Battle Fleets	Admiral or Vice Admiral
Battle Fleet (US, 1922–1941)	A large number of vessels of all types	2+ Task Forces	Vice Admiral
Task Force or Carrier strike group (US)	A collection of complementary vessels	2+ Task Groups, Divisions or Flotillas	Rear Admiral (upper half) or Rear Admiral
Division or Task Group	Usually capital ships	2+ large vessels	Rear Admiral (lower half), Commodore, or Division Admiral
Flotilla or Task Group	A small number of vessels, usually of the same or similar types	2+ Squadrons	Rear Admiral (lower half), Commodore, or Flotilla Admiral
Squadron or Task Unit	Small vessels	A small number of vessels, usually of the same or similar types	Captain or Commander
Task Element	A single vessel	One	Captain, Commander, Lieutenant Commander or Lieutenant

The five-star rank of admiral of the fleet, or fleet admiral, have largely been out of regular use since the 1990s. It is the exceptional rank during war on the scale of World War II. Currently, all major navies (blue-water and green-water navies) are commanded by an admiral of either four-star rank or three-star rank depending on relative size. Smaller naval forces, such as the Royal New Zealand Navy, or those navies that are effectively coast guards, are commanded by a rear-admiral (two-star rank), commodore (one-star rank) or even a captain.

Aircraft carriers are typically commanded by a captain. Submarines and destroyers are typically commanded by a captain or commander. Some destroyers, particularly smaller destroyers such as frigates (formerly known as destroyer escorts) are usually commanded by officers with the rank of commander. Corvettes, the smallest class of warship, are commanded by officers with the rank of commander or lieutenant-commander. Auxiliary ships, including gunboats, minesweepers, patrol boats, military riverine craft, tenders and torpedo boats are usually commanded by lieutenants, sub-lieutenants or warrant officers. Usually, the smaller the vessel, the lower the rank of the ship's commander. For example, patrol boats are often commanded by ensigns, while frigates are rarely commanded by an officer below the rank of commander.

Historically, navies were far more rigid in structure. Ships were collected in divisions, which in turn were collected in numbered squadrons, which comprised a numbered fleet. Permission for a vessel to leave one unit and join another would have to be approved on paper.

The modern U.S. Navy is primarily based on a number of standard groupings of vessels, including the carrier strike group and the expeditionary strike group.

Additionally, naval organization continues aboard a single ship. The complement forms three or four departments (such as tactical and engineering), each of which has a number of divisions, followed by work centers.

=== Air force ===
The organizational structures of air forces vary between nations: some air forces (such as the United States Air Force and the Royal Air Force) are divided into commands, groups and squadrons; others (such as the Soviet Air Force) have an Army-style organizational structure. The modern Royal Canadian Air Force uses Air division as the formation between wings and the entire air command. Like the RAF, Canadian wings consist of squadrons.

NATO Symbol (for Army comparison)	Unit Name (USAF/RAF/Other air forces)	No. of personnel	No. of aircraft	No. of subordinate units (USAF/RAF)	Officer in command (USAF/RAF)
	Combatant Command or national air force	Entire air force	Entire air force	All Major Commands / Commands	GAF / MRAF or Air Chf Mshl
	Major Command / Command	Varies	Varies	Varies by Region or Duty	Gen / Air Chf Mshl
	No USAF equivalent/Command or Tactical Air Force / Air army	Varies by Region or Duty	Varies	Varies by Region or Duty	Gen or Lt-Gen / Air Chf Mshl or Air Mshl
	Numbered Air Force/No RAF equivalent	Varies by Region or Duty	Varies	2+ Wings/Groups	Maj-Gen or Lt-Gen / N/A
	No USAF equivalent/No RAF equivalent /Aviation Division /Air division	Varies by Region or Duty	Varies	2+ Wings/Groups	Maj-Gen or Div-Gen
	Wing/Group (inc. EAGs) /Russian aviation brigade/Air Brigade	1,000–5,000	48–200	2+ Groups/Wings	Brig-Gen/AVM or Air Cdre
	Group/wing (inc. EAWs) or Station /Russian aviation regiment	300–1,000	17–48	3–4 Squadrons/3–10 Flights	Col/Gp Capt or Wg Cdr
	Squadron	100–300	7–16	3–4 Flights	Lt Col or Maj/Wg Cdr or Sqn Ldr
	Flight or flying staffel	20–100	4–6	2 or more Sections plus maintenance and support crew	Maj or Capt/Sqn Ldr or Flt Lt
	Staffel or echelon	40–160	6–12	1–2 Sections plus maintenance and support crew	Capt or Staff Captain
	Section	10–40	n/a–2	n/a	Junior Officer or Senior NCO
	Element	8–12	n/a	n/a	Senior NCO or Junior NCO
	Detail or crew	2–4	n/a	n/a	Junior NCO

== Task force ==
A task force is a unit or formation created as a temporary grouping for a specific operational purpose. Aside from administrative hierarchical forms of organization that have evolved since the early 17th century in Europe, fighting forces have been grouped for specific operational purposes into mission-related organizations such as the German Kampfgruppe or the U.S. Combat Team (Army) and Task Force (Navy) during the Second World War, or the Soviet Operational manoeuvre group during the Cold War. In the British and Commonwealth armies the battlegroup became the usual grouping of companies during the Second World War and the Cold War.

Within NATO, a Joint Task Force (JTF) would be such a temporary grouping that includes elements from more than one armed service, a Combined Task Force (CTF) would be such a temporary grouping that includes elements from more than one nation, and a Combined Joint Task Force (CJTF) would be such a temporary grouping that includes elements of more than one armed service and more than one nation.

== See also ==
- Command and control
- Military administration
