= Wing (military unit) =

Military unit size designation

In military aviation, a wing is a unit of command. In most military aviation services, a wing is a relatively large formation of planes. In Commonwealth countries a wing usually comprises three squadrons, with several wings forming a group (around 10 squadrons). Each squadron will contain around 20 planes.

Organizational structure of flying units in selected NATO countries, by relative size
Size group	British and USN	USAF and USMC	USSF	Canadian	French AAE	German Air Force	Italian Air Force	NATO rank level of general or commanding officer
8		Air division (no longer used)		Air division Division aérienne		Luftwaffendivision (no longer used)	Divisione aerea	OF-7
7	Group	Wing	Delta (OF-5)	Group; Groupe aérien (no longer used)	Brigade Aérienne	Geschwader (OF-5)	Brigata aerea	OF-5, or OF-6
6	Wing	Group	Delta (OF-5)	Wing; Escadre	Escadre	Gruppe (OF-4)	Stormo	OF-4, OF-5, or OF-6
5	Squadron	Squadron	Squadron (OF-4)	Squadron; Escadron	Escadron	Staffel (OF-3)	Gruppo	OF-3 or OF-4
4	Flight	Flight		Flight; Escadrille	Escadrille	Schwarm / Kette	Squadriglia	OF-2 or OF-3
3	Flight	Element/Section		Section	Section	Rotte	sezione	OF-1 or OF-2

== Commonwealth usage ==
=== Origins ===
On its establishment in 1912, the British Royal Flying Corps (RFC) was intended to be an inter-service, combined force of the British Army and Royal Navy. Given the rivalry that existed between the army and navy, new terminology was used, in order to avoid marking the corps out as having an army or navy ethos. While the term "wing" had been used in the cavalry, its more general use predominated. Accordingly, the word "wing", with its allusion of flight, was chosen as the term of subdivision and the corps was split into a "Military Wing" (i.e. an army wing) and a "Naval Wing". Each wing consisted of a number of squadrons (the term "squadron" already being used by both the Army and the Navy).

By 1914, the naval wing had become the Royal Naval Air Service, and gained its independence from the Royal Flying Corps. In 1915, the Royal Flying Corps had significantly expanded and it was felt necessary to create organizational units which would control two or more squadrons; the term "wing" was re-used for these new organizational units.

The Royal Flying Corps was amalgamated with the Royal Naval Air Service in 1918, creating the Royal Air Force. The RFC usage of wing was maintained in the new service.

=== Current use ===
Unit type	Commanding officer	NATO standard rank scale
Operational flying wings	Group Captain	OF-5
Ground-based wings	Wing Commander	OF-4

In most Commonwealth air forces, as well as some others, a wing is usually made up of three or four squadrons. In these air forces a wing is inferior to a group. Originally all wings were usually commanded by a wing commander (equivalent to a lieutenant colonel). From World War II onwards, operational flying wings have usually been commanded by group captains (equivalent to colonels), whereas ground-based wings have continued to be commanded by wing commanders.

Air forces of NATO member countries which use the term 'wing' to denote their main formations include the Spanish Air Force (Ala), the Hellenic Air Force (πτέρυγα [pteryga]), Royal Norwegian Air Force (luftving, Norwegian for air wing), Royal Danish Air Force (which adopted the English term wing directly, although the Danish word is vinge), the Belgian Air Component (also adopted the English term wing directly), the Polish Air Force (skrzydło) and the Slovak Air Force (krídlo).

Additionally countries influenced by the US in the building of their modern air forces also use the term wing. Several such examples are the Republic of Korea Air Force, the Japan Air Self-Defense Force, the Royal Thai Air Force, the Philippine Air Force, the Peruvian Air Force, the Venezuelan Air Force, the Ecuadorian Air Force and the Brazilian Air Force.

A wing may also be used for non-flying units, such as the infantry forces of the RAF Regiment, (in which a wing equates to a battalion). Additionally, RAF stations are administratively divided into wings.

In 2006, expeditionary air wings were established at the RAF's main operating bases. These expeditionary air wings consist of the deployable elements of the main operating base and other supplementary forces. Expeditionary air wings may be subordinated to an expeditionary air group.

In the British Air Training Corps, a wing consists of a number of squadrons within a designated geographical area, usually named after the county in which it is based. In this context, a wing is inferior to a "region" which is made up of six wings. In all, there are 36 Air Training Corps wings in six regions within the United Kingdom, each of which is commanded by a RAFVR(T) wing commander.

== Canadian usage ==
While the original pre-unification Royal Canadian Air Force followed the British pattern and used squadrons, which belonged to wings, which in turn belonged to groups, the modern Royal Canadian Air Force has eliminated groups. Squadrons still report to wings which now report to one of two air divisions. Wings vary greatly in size and may comprise personnel numbering in the hundreds or thousands.

In the 1990s, the Canadian Forces Air Command (the post-1968 RCAF until 2011) altered the structure of those bases under its control, declaring them to be wings under the overall control of 1 Canadian Air Division in Winnipeg. For instance, CFB Trenton in Ontario was redesignated 8 Wing Trenton. The base commander of these bases (as well as other wings whose headquarters were stood up on bases not controlled by Air Command, such as 16 Wing at CFB Borden and 1 Wing at CFB Kingston) were re-designated Wing Commanders (or Wg Comd). As well as continuing their functions as the commanding officers of the bases they were assigned to, they also serve as formation commanders to all squadrons and units duly assigned to them by 1 Canadian Air Division or 2 Canadian Air Division (regardless if they are physically located on the base in question or elsewhere; as witness 12 Wing in Nova Scotia, which has one unit, 443 Maritime Helicopter Squadron, based at Patricia Bay near CFB Esquimalt in British Columbia, on the other side of the country from Shearwater).

== United States ==
=== United States Air Force & Civil Air Patrol ===
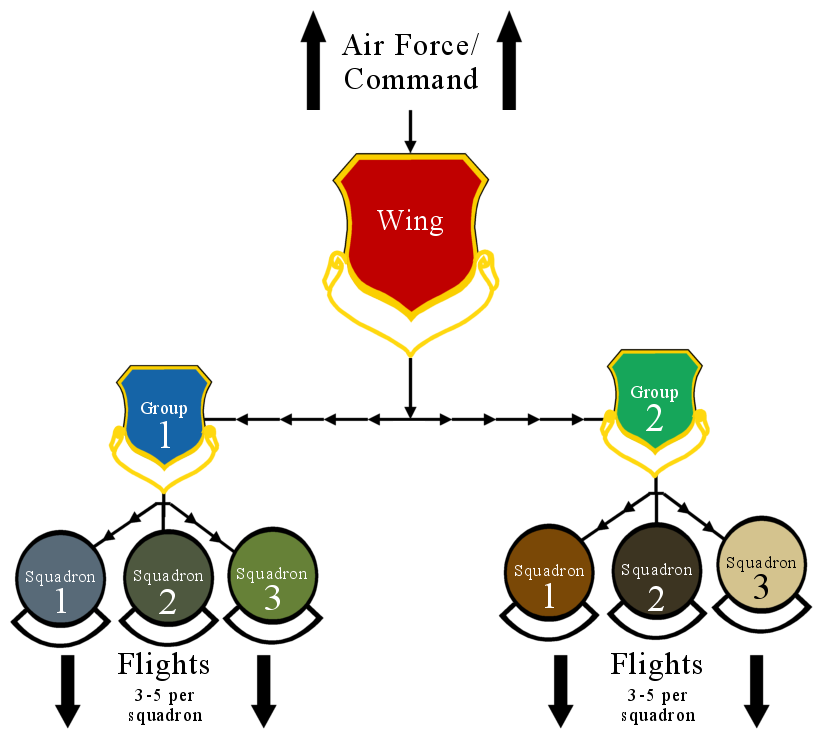
Diagram of a typical US Air Force wing organizational structure

By comparison, in the United States Air Force, a wing is normally the organizational tier below a Numbered Air Force. Most USAF wings are commanded by a colonel, but some are commanded by brigadier generals. USAF wings are structured to fulfill a mission from a specific base, and contain a headquarters and four groups: an operations group, a maintenance group, a medical group and a mission support group. Such a wing is referred to as a Combat Wing Organization, which is comparable to a brigade in the US Army. Other wings, such as Air Expeditionary Wings, exist for various other purposes, and their scope may extend to one base, one theater or worldwide.

In United States Air Force usage, a military organization above a squadron level (group, wing, air division, numbered air force, air component command, Major Command (MAJCOM)) is an establishment, while that of a squadron and lower (squadron, flight, center, complex), if designated as such, is a unit.

The U.S. Army Air Service/U.S. Army Air Corps/U.S. Army Air Forces wings that existed before 1947 are not comparable with the wings of the USAF. World War II wings, for example, were expansive administrative and operational organizations that usually controlled several combat groups and numerous service organizations, often located at widely scattered locations. Many World War II wings were redesignated as air divisions after the war. Modern wings began with a service test of combat wings in 1947-1948. These wings were temporary Table of Distribution (T/D) organizations, each having a combat group (the only Table of Organization establishment of the wings), an airdrome group, a maintenance and supply group, and a station medical group. At the end of the service test, the Air Force implemented the Hobson Plan and replaced these T/D wings with permanent Table of Organization and Equipment (constituted) combat wings having a combat group, an air base group, a maintenance and supply group, and a medical group.

Constituted combat wings are always numbered in a single series beginning with Arabic "1st". Examples: 1st Fighter Wing, 21st Space Wing, and the Strategic Air Command's 509th Bomb Wing. All constituted wings have one, two, or three digits in their numerical designations.

In many cases, the numerical designation of the wing came from the combat group that preceded it and became an integral part of the post-World War II wing. In other words, when the 14th Fighter Wing (later, 14th Flying Training Wing) came into existence, it received the 14th numerical designation from the 14th Fighter Group, which had already existed for several years and became the wing's combat component. At the same time, the other component establishments, and units of these establishments, also received the 14th numerical designations, aligning each of them directly to the 14th Wing. However, the tactical squadrons of the combat group retained their separate and distinct numerical designations.

The Air Force has three basic types of wings: operational, air base, and specialized mission. According to Air Force Instruction 38-101 (1994):

- an operational wing is a wing that has an operations group and related operational mission activity assigned to it. When an operational wing performs the primary mission of the base, it usually maintains and operates the base. In addition, an operational wing is capable of self-support in functional areas like maintenance, supply, and munitions, as needed. When an operational wing is a tenant organization, the host command provides it with varying degrees of base and logistics support.
- An air base wing usually maintains and operates a base, and often provides functional support to a major command headquarters.
- A specialized mission wing may be either a host wing or a tenant wing and performs a specialized mission such as intelligence or training."

In the Civil Air Patrol, there are 52 wings (each of the 50 states plus Washington, D.C., and Puerto Rico). Each wing supervises the individual groups and squadrons in that state, district or commonwealth, which are the basic operational units of the organization. Some wings, for example Delaware Wing, have only one group due to the small geographical and manpower size of the wing.

=== U.S. Naval Aviation (U.S. Navy and Marine Corps) ===
The United States Navy follows the British structure in that a wing is an administrative formation commanding two or more squadrons of aircraft that are based on land. Several wings are combined into a Naval Air Force. The several wings assigned to each Fleet Naval Air Force control the wing's type squadrons. A carrier air wing (CVW, formerly known as a carrier air group) consists of several squadrons and is an operational formation that is based on an aircraft carrier. The squadrons of a CVW are also assigned to administrative type wings (such as Strike Fighter Wing Atlantic). Naval Air Forces are commanded by either a rear admiral (upper half) or a vice admiral and wings are commanded by captains, with the title of commodore. Carrier air wings are commanded by either a Navy captain or a USMC colonel with the title of "CAG" (Commander, Air Group), a legacy title from the former carrier air groups.

In the United States Marine Corps, a Marine Aircraft Wing (MAW) is an overall command, equivalent to a Marine Division, consisting of at least two Marine Aircraft Groups, a Marine Air Control Group (MACG), a Marine Wing Headquarters Squadron (MWHS), and a Marine Wing Headquarters (the Wing Commander and his staff). Being equivalent to a division in size, its commander is usually a major general.

Unlike their USAF counterparts, all USN and USMC air wings are tenant activities ashore and have no command responsibility for the installation at which they are normally based when not afloat or forward deployed. Naval air stations and Marine Corps air stations (and facilities) have separate commanding officers that are independent of the operational wing structure. Many mission support functions on these installations, such as personnel support and medical/dental facilities, are also independent of both the air wing and air station command structures and are independent tenant commands with their own commanding officers or officers-in-charge.

=== United States Space Force ===
The United States Space Force has a single command echelon known as a delta which combines the wing and group echelons found in air forces.

== Equivalents in other languages ==
In other languages, equivalent air force units equivalent to a US wing include: Geschwader in the German Luftwaffe; Aviatsionniy Polk (Aviation Regiment) in Russia; Stormo in Italy; and escadre or régiment in the French Air Force. (Escadre is also the official Canadian French translation of wing in the Canadian Forces.) The French Escadre and the German Geschwader originate from the naval term squadron. A similar formation in the Swedish Air Force is the Flygflottilj, which translates in English as air wing (literal meaning is air flotilla or flight flotilla). Among the NATO member countries the Turkish Air Force (Ana Üssü, Turkish for main base), the Bulgarian Air Force (авиобаза [aviobaza], Bulgarian for air base or aviation base) and the Romanian Air Force (bază aeriană, Romanian for air base) use the term air base for their main formations. These air bases are brigade-equivalents commanded by brigadier generals unlike the air wings of other NATO members, which are regiment-equivalents commanded by colonels. The Royal Netherlands Air Force (vliegbasis, Dutch for aviation base or air base), the Portuguese Air Force (base aérea), the Czech Air Force (základna letectva, Czech for air base or aviation base) and the Croatian Air Force (zrakoplovna baza, Croatian for aviation base) use the term air base for regiment-equivalents commanded by colonels in a direct parallel to the wings of other member states.

Modern German Air Force usage
Unit type	Commanding officer
Taktisches Luftwaffengeschwader (en: Tactical Air Force Wing)	Geschwaderkommodore (OF-5)
Fliegerabwehrraketengeschwader (en: Air Defence Missile Wing)	Geschwaderkommodore (OF-5)

Non-English equivalents of the British wing include the German Gruppe, Italian Gruppo, and French groupe.

=== German usage in World War II ===
The World War II German Luftwaffe Geschwader and Gruppe were similar to the wing and group of the United States Army Air Forces of the same era.
