= Flight (military unit) =

Type of military unit

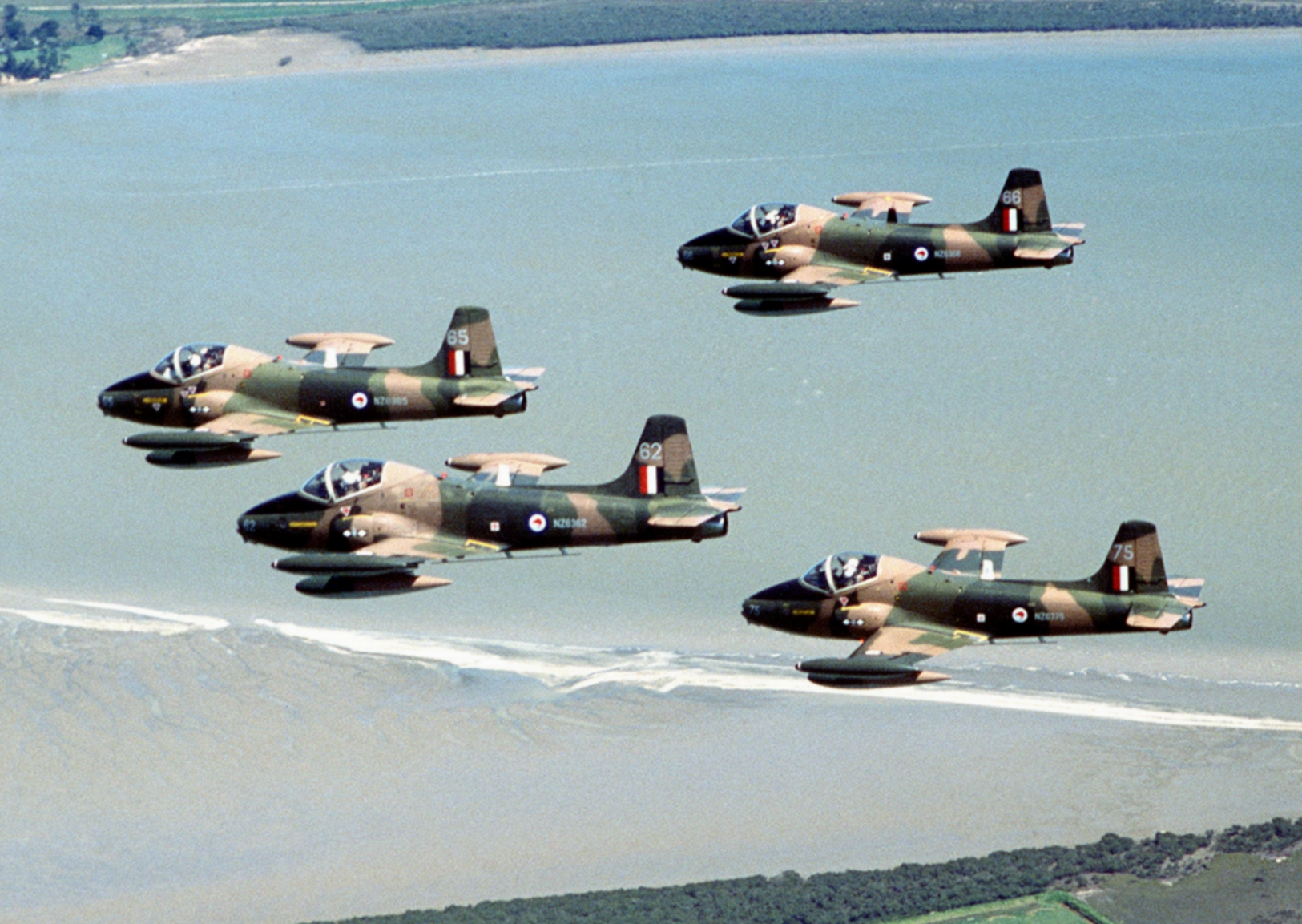
A flight of four RNZAF Strikemasters.

A flight is a small military unit within the larger structure of an air force, naval air service, or army air corps; and is usually subordinate to a larger squadron. A military aircraft flight is typically composed of four aircraft, though two to six aircraft may also form an aircraft flight; along with their aircrews and ground staff. In some very specific examples, typically involving historic aircraft, a flight may contain as many as twelve aircraft, as is the case with the Battle of Britain Memorial Flight (BBMF) of the Royal Air Force (RAF) in the United Kingdom. In most usages, two or more flights make up a squadron.

Foreign languages equivalents include escadrille (French), escuadrilla (Spanish), esquadrilha (Portuguese), lanka (Ukrainian), patrulă (Romanian), zveno (Russian), and Schwarm (German).

In the case of a non-flying, or 'ground flight', such as Mechanical Transport Flight (MTF), Supply Flight, Accounts Flight, etc; no aircraft, and a roughly equivalent number of support personnel may be utilised.

The term 'flight' is also a basic unit for intercontinental ballistic missiles (ICBMs).

== Origins ==
The use of the term 'flight' originated in the United Kingdom (UK) to describe a collection of aircraft (typically four in the early days of aviation), and dates back to around 1912. It has been suggested that the term was coined by technical sub-committee of the Committee of Imperial Defence, which was examining the British air arrangements around the same time.

== Commonwealth flights ==
=== Aircraft flight ===
In the United Kingdom, the Royal Air Force (RAF), and the other air forces of the British Commonwealth, from where much air force terminology emanated, an aircraft flight, in the first decades of air forces, was commanded by a flight lieutenant (FltLt), a rank equivalent to captain in armies and other air forces, or a naval lieutenant. More recently, however, it has become common for a flight to be led by a squadron leader (SqnLdr); a formal rank distinct from the appointment of squadron commander; equivalent to an army major or naval lieutenant commander.

On rare occasions, a flight may further be sub-divided into two sections, each containing two to three aircraft, which share ground staff with the other section, and are usually commanded by a flight lieutenant.

The Royal Navy's (RN) Fleet Air Arm (FAA), the Army Air Corps (AAC), and other Commonwealth naval and army aviation arms also have flights. In the Fleet Air Arm, a flight could be as few as a single helicopter operating from a smaller ship.

=== Ground flight ===
A ground flight within an air force is roughly equivalent to a platoon in an army, and may be commanded by a flight lieutenant, flying officer, pilot officer, or warrant officer. These ground flights may carry out operational roles (such as air traffic control, airfield defence, or firefighting), engineering roles (such as aircraft maintenance, ground-based mechanical engineering, or other ground systems maintenance), support roles (including medical, dental, physical training, supply and logistics, training and education, and legal units), or purely administrative roles (such as finance, infrastructure, or human resource management).

== American flights ==
The United States Air Force (USAF) has three types of flights: numbered, alphabetic, and aircraft (which may be designated by alpha-numerics or name).

A numbered flight is a unit with a unique base, wing, group, or Numbered Air Force mission; such as training or finance, though not large enough to warrant designation as a squadron. Numbered flights are uncommon, and are usually only found in basic training facilities.

An alphabetic flight is an operational component of a flying or ground squadron, not an independent unit; alphabetic flights within a squadron normally have identical or similar functions, and are normally designated A, B, C, and so, on within the squadron. Flights in the USAF are generally authorised to have between 20 and 100 personnel, and are normally commanded by a company-grade officer (lieutenant or captain), and / or a flight chief, usually a senior non-commissioned officer (NCO) with the rank of master sergeant or senior master sergeant.

In USAF flying squadrons, the term flight also designates a tactical sub-unit of a squadron consisting of two or three elements (designated 'sections' in U.S. Army and U.S. Naval Aviation), with each element consisting of two or three aircraft. The flight operates under the command of a designated flight leader. In U.S. Army Aviation, the equivalent organisational level of a flight is called a 'platoon', while in U.S. Naval Aviation the flight is known as a 'division'.

In Minuteman intercontinental ballistic missile units of the U.S. Air Force, a flight is composed of ten unstaffed launch facilities, remotely controlled by a staffed launch control center, containing two personnel. Five of these flights make up one missile squadron. The Air Force has a total of 45 ICBM missile flights.

Under U.S. military and FAA common usage, for air traffic control and separation purposes, a 'flight' of aircraft is simply two or more aircraft intentionally operating in close proximity to each other (typically in formation) under a designated 'flight leader', without regard to military organisational hierarchy.

== French flights ==
An escadrille (literal translations: 'squad' or 'small squadron') is the label given to flights in the air forces and navies of some French-speaking countries. While the term is frequently translated into English as 'squadron', an escadrille was originally a smaller unit (whereas the French escadron, also translated as 'squadron', in the context of aviation is a much larger unit, comparable in status to a naval squadron).

The first air escadrilles were formed in France before World War I, in 1912. They were initially a loosely defined group of aircraft capable of similar tasks, in most cases not more than six aeroplanes in each. During the war, the escadrille became the basic independent unit of aviation within the French armed forces. An escadrille was a homogeneous unit, armed with a single type of aeroplane, with permanent flying and ground personnel attached, motorised transport, and tent hangars. By mid-1915, the Armée de l'air had grown to 119 escadrilles of ten aircraft each: fourteen of fighters, fifty of bombers, and the rest reconnaissance, spotter, and communications units. While escadrilles initially operated independently, during the Battle of Verdun (1916), chasseur (fighter) escadrilles were formed into larger formations, for easier coordination.

During World War II, French escadrilles usually fielded between ten and twelve aircraft. Hence they were roughly equivalent to a German Staffel, Italian gruppo, or Polish eskadra (ten aircraft in 1939). This was in contrast to air squadrons of the British Commonwealth or United States, which usually had twelve to eighteen aircraft, divided into two to four aircraft flights.

Until 1949, between one and four French escadrilles formed a groupe. Since then, however, escadrilles have been subordinate to escadrons. As such, groupes and escadrons are the equivalent of the German language terms Gruppe and Geschwader; and the English language terms 'wing' and 'group' (the definitions of which also vary from one nation to another).

== German flights ==
A Schwarm (meaning swarm) as part of a Staffel (squadron) comprises four aircraft, and can be further sub-divided into two-ships called Rotte (meaning rout, two aircraft). The tactical formation, however, is the two-ship with hot spare (the English term is used), the third aircraft being released before reaching the target if none of the others had to be sent back earlier. The Kette (meaning chain) of three aircraft is a historic term. These terms refer to groups of aircraft only and are not used for ground units.

== See also ==
- Finger-four
- Naval air squadron
