= List of United States Army Air Forces Air Force Component Commands =

List of component commands of the U.S. numbered air forces during World War II

This is a list of United States Army Air Force - Air Force Component Commands. It covers the component commands of the numbered air forces during World War II. During that period, that numbered air forces had a status currently enjoyed by Air Force major commands.

- I Bomber Command
- I Fighter Command
- I Troop Carrier Command
- II Bomber Command
- III Air Support Command
- III Bomber Command
- III Fighter Command
- III Reconnaissance Command
- III Tactical Air Command
- IV Bomber Command
- IV Fighter Command
- V Bomber Command
- V Fighter Command
- VI Bomber Command
- VII Bomber Command
- VIII Air Support Command
- VIII Bomber Command
- VIII Fighter Command
- IX Air Defense Command
- IX Fighter Command
- IX Tactical Air Command
- IX Troop Carrier Command
- IX Air Service Command
- IX Engineer Command (airfield construction, see Advanced Landing Ground)
- XI Bomber Command
- XI Fighter Command
- XII Bomber Command
- XII Tactical Air Command
- XII Engineer Command
- XIII Bomber Command
- XIII Fighter Command
- XV Fighter Command
- XIX Tactical Air Command
- XX Bomber Command
- XXI Bomber Command
- XXII Bomber Command
- XXII Tactical Air Command
- XXVI Fighter Command
- XXXVI Fighter Command
