= Air division =

Military unit size designation

An air division is an air force or naval air formation that is roughly equivalent to an army division. An air division is usually commanded by a major general and it is composed of multiple wings, groups, air brigades, or equivalently-sized air force formations.

== Examples ==
Examples of air divisions which have been used in different nations include:

- Aviation Division of Soviet forces
- Air Division (United States)
- 1 Canadian Air Division and 2 Canadian Air Division
- Air divisions in the German Luftwaffe (see Organization of the Luftwaffe (1933–45)#Fliegerkorps and Fliegerdivision)
- Air divisions in the German Bundeswehr (see de:Luftwaffendivision)
- 1st Fighter Aviation Division (People's Liberation Army Air Force) of China, and other aviation divisions
- Royal Thai Naval Air Division

== See also ==
- Aeronautical Division, U.S. Signal Corps (1907–1914)
- Aviation Division (Pakistan) (a department of Government of Pakistan, not an air division)
- Category:Air divisions (air force unit)
