= Vic formation =

Military aircraft formation

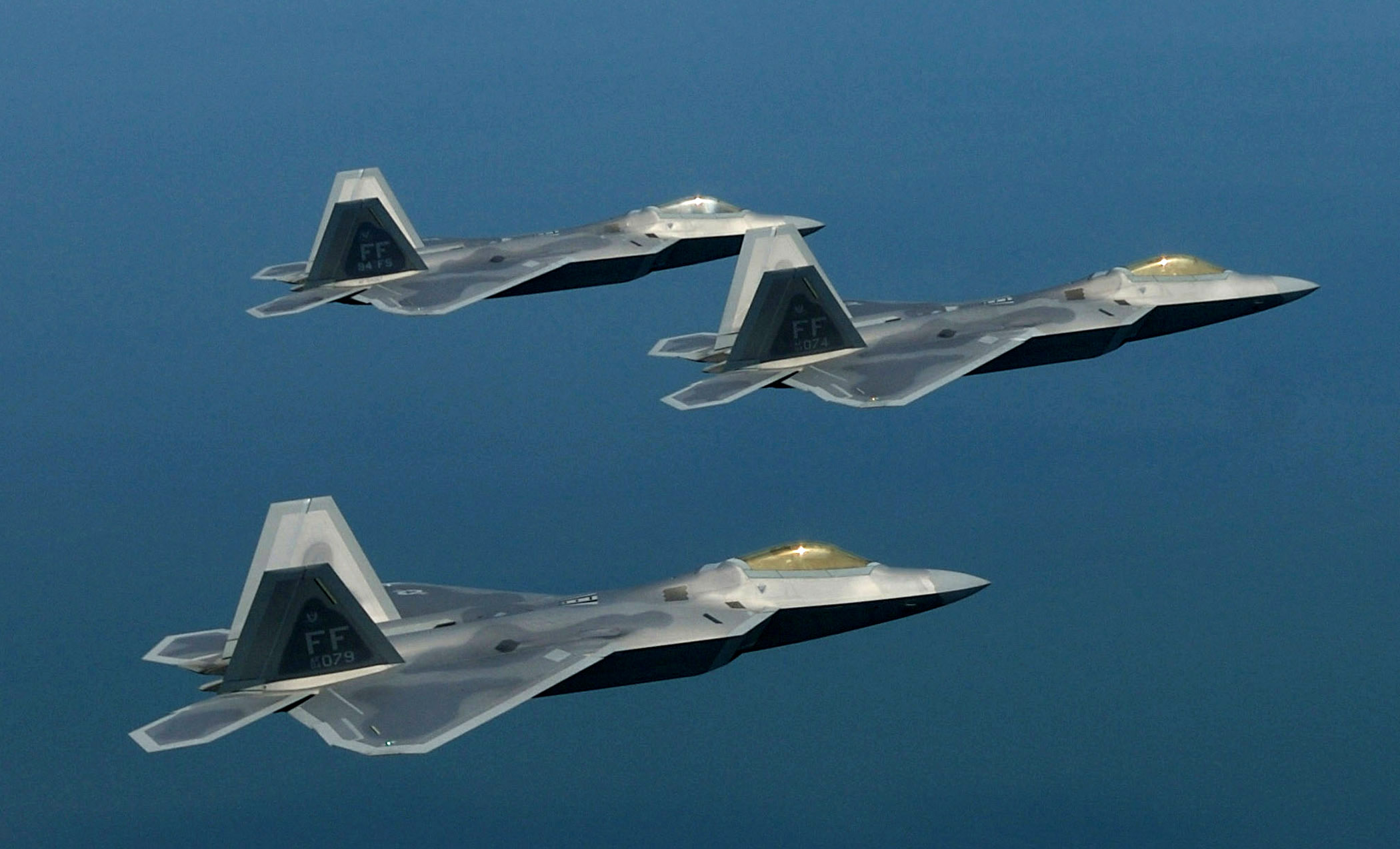
F-22A Raptors in Vic formation

The Vic formation is a formation devised for military aircraft and first used during the First World War. It consists of three or more aircraft in close formation, with the leader at the apex and the rest of the flight en echelon to the left and the right, the whole resembling the letter "V" The formation's name is derived from the term that was then used for "V" in the RAF phonetic alphabet.

The formation is still in use but has been superseded or replaced in some circumstances.

== History ==
At the start of the First World War, little thought had been given to the most efficient formations to use for military aircraft. Groups of fliers, drawn from the various nations' army or navy, would fly in columns, or linse ahead as if they were troops of cavalry or flotillas of ships. That was soon found to be inefficient for several reasons. Firstly, the leaders and their squadrons could not communicate with each other except for the vague instruction to follow the leader. Secondly, if they came under anti-aircraft fire from the ground, the flight would all turn at once, scattering the formation, or would follow the leader round a point, as horsemen or ships, which maintained cohesion but were exposed to fire on a fixed point . The remedy was to fly in a close V formation, which allowed the aircraft to make a sudden 180 degree turn if they were fired upon, which would leave them flying out of danger with the formation intact but with their positions in the formation reversed .

The formation also allowed the fliers to see one another and communicate by hand signals and allowed them to stay together in poor visibility or cloud. Later, when bomber and reconnaissance flights came under attack from fighter aircraft, the Vic proved to have good defensive characteristics. Pilots, looking inwards to maintain formation, could overlook one another for attackers, and their observer/rear gunners could use interlocking fire to protect one another.

The Vic was the basic flying formation adopted by every major air force. The French Air Force referred to it as the Chevron, and the Imperial German Army Air Service dubbed it the Kette. It remained the standard formation throughout the interwar period and into the Second World War.

The basic unit was the three-plane section in a Vic. Two sections made up a flight and two flights a squadron. Squadrons would fly in line astern, one Vic behind another, which left the squadron leader effectively the only person looking for the enemy.

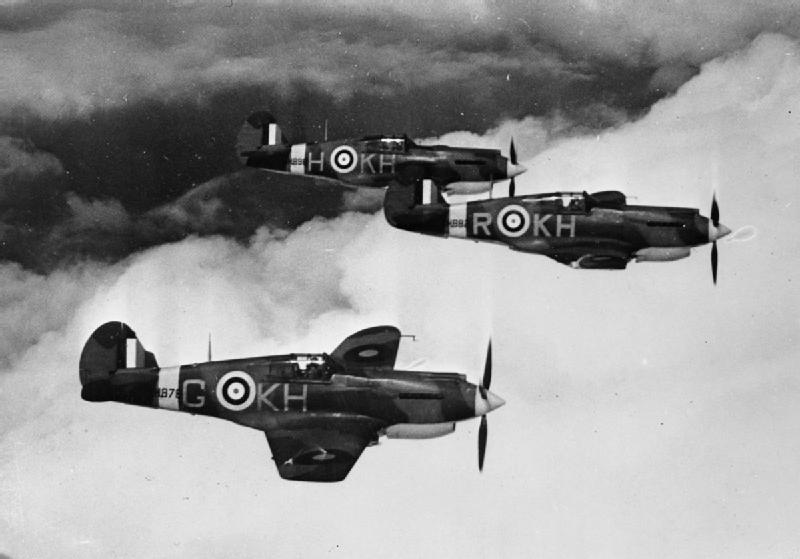
RAF Tomahawks in Vic formation

At the outbreak of the Second World War, the Vic was still in use by both bombers and fighter formations in most air forces, but the Finnish and German air force fighter units had changed to the more flexible and aggressive pair (Rotte) and four (Schwarm) combination. They comprised a pair (leader and wingman) and four (two pairs) in a "finger-four" arrangement.

The Luftwaffe pilots were disparaging about the RAF's use of the Vic formation during the Battle of Britain, but in practice, there was little else that Allied pilots could do. Germany, as the aggressor, had the choice of how and when to attack, and, based on its experience during the Spanish Civil War, it had changed and developed its tactics accordingly. Fighter Command could only improvise until the battle was over before it reviewed and made changes. As an interim method, RAF adopted the line astern formation on which four-plane flights flew behind one another. Luftwaffe related to them derisively by calling them Idiotenreihen ("rows of idiots")

Bob Oxspring, a pilot officer in 66 Squadron and a future ace, commented:

"We knew there was a lot wrong with our tactics during the Battle of Britain but it was one hell of a time to alter everything we had practiced.

We had not time to experiment when we were in combat three and four times a day. Moreover we were getting fresh pilots straight out of Flying School who were trained - barely - to use the old type of close formation – they simply could not have coped with anything radically different".

In addition, the primary purpose of Fighter Command was to intercept the bombers, which still flew in the defensive Kette and so the optimum formation for attacking them was a corresponding three-plane Vic so that each fighter would find itself against a different bomber.

That was also the conclusion of the Luftwaffe later. When faced with USAAF bombers in their box formations of massed Vics, German pilots reverted to the Kette to tackle them.

Some modifications were made by the RAF within the Vic structure. Pilots learned to open the formation, and the rearmost Vic in a Squadron was tasked with weaving to improve observation, but casualties from the weavers remained high.

When the campaign was over, Fighter Command experimented with and adopted the pair and four arrangements, but they could fly in echelon or in line astern to aid in identification. Douglas Bader, of 242 Squadron experimented with the finger-four arrangement and found it beneficial. By 1941, it was in general use in the RAF.

Four elements in vic formation comprising a combat box

In 1942 was the arrival of the US Army Air Forces, whose strategy was daylight bombing. Tight bomber formations relying on massed defensive fire were expected to win through to the target. The most basic formation for bombers was a three-plane "V", called an "element". Stacks of these elements were configured to form a defensive bombing formation called the "combat box". The combat boxes, involving full squadrons, groups or entire wings, could produce huge firepower and offer mutual support, but casualties remained high without fighter escort.

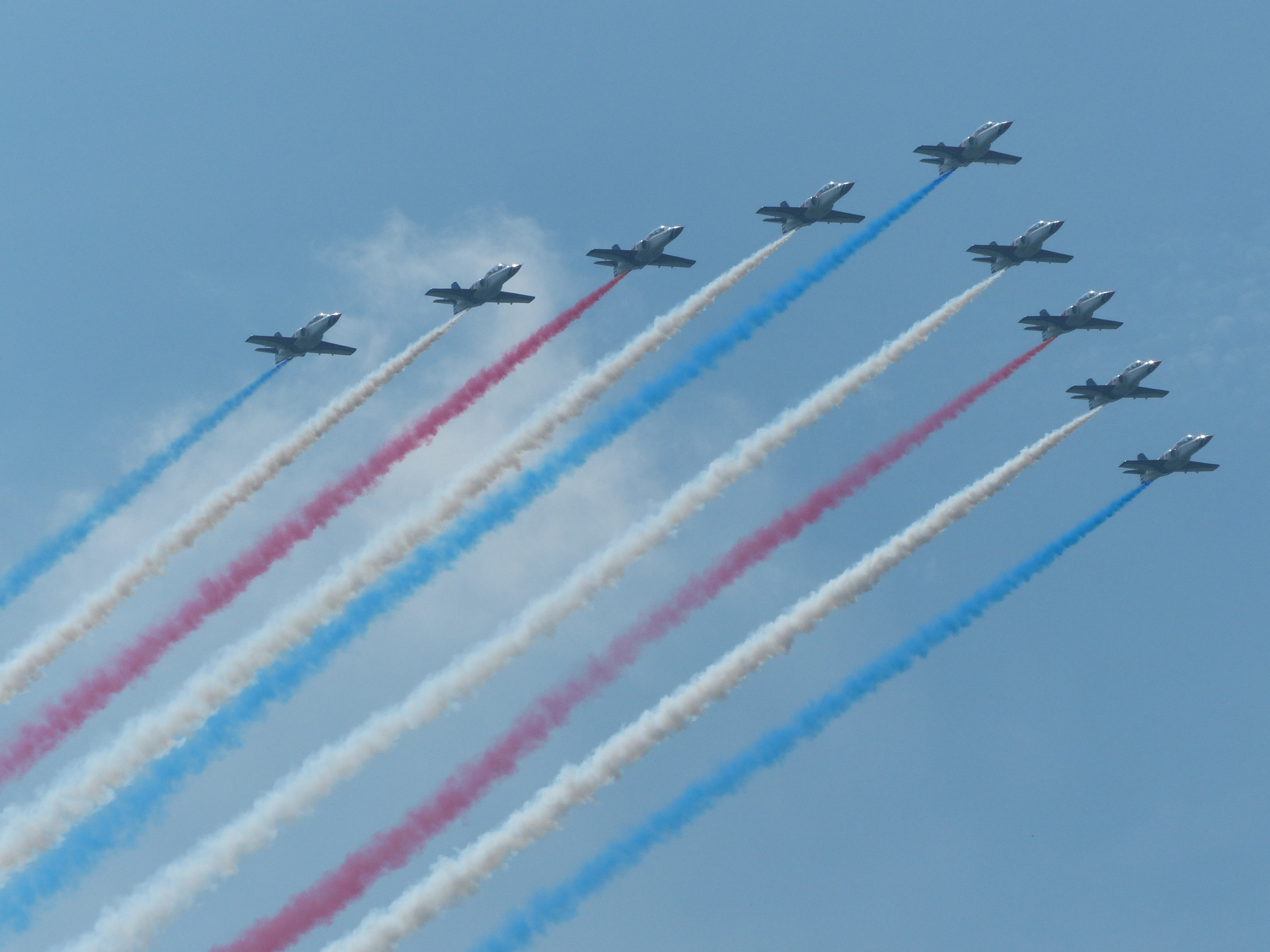
Modern aerobatics team in Vic formation

The Vic formation remains in use today.
