= Air Division (United States) =

Former level of command within the United States Air Force

In the United States Air Force, a division was an intermediate level of command, subordinate to a numbered air force, controlling one or more wings. It also controlled squadrons without associated same-function wings, i.e., 17th Defense Systems Evaluation Squadron had no associated wing, but its function was part of the 24th Air Division. Divisions are now considered obsolete.

== History ==
On 16 September 1947, the United States Army Air Forces became the United States Air Force as a separate and equal element of the United States armed forces. Earlier, on 21 March 1946, General Carl A. Spaatz had undertaken a major reorganization of the Army Air Forces that had included the establishment of the major command echelon as the first level of command below Headquarters, USAAF.

The World War II commands, which had been subordinate to the numbered air forces, were eliminated in the reorganization of 1946, and the Numbered Air Forces were made components of the major commands at home and overseas.

The new organizational hierarchy thus contained the following levels : squadron, group, wing, air force, command. In 1948, and afterward, the World War II wings were redesignated "divisions", and placed immediately below the numbered air forces in the organizational pyramid. The "wing" was redefined to be the USAF basic organizational unit which exercised command and control over a "Base", the physical facility that included the airfield and the support units (groups, squadrons) to support the operation of a wing.

In the years after 1948, the Air Force "division" carried several designations of the name "strategic aerospace division"; "strategic missile division"; "space division", however the most common designation was "air division". An air division was commanded by major general, brigadier general or colonel.

== Usage ==
Air divisions were found in all major commands between 1948 and 1992, when the last air division was inactivated. Official policy dictated the use of Arabic numerals for numbered air and aerospace divisions. Examples: 2nd Air Division, 7th Air Division, and 1st Strategic Aerospace Division.

Following the initiation of major command-controlled (MAJCON) four-digit Table of Distribution (T/D) organizations in 1948, the major commands were briefly authorized to organize air divisions, provided they secured USAF approval. Two four-digit air divisions (4310th Air Division and 7217th Air Division) were subsequently organized.

Besides numbered air divisions, a named air division was an organization within a large support command that was assigned a major or important segment of that command's mission—e.g., the Electronic Systems Division handled a large part of the Air Force Systems Command's work-load in electronic systems. Because they were usually technical or highly specialized in nature, named divisions generally had a large number of personnel. One named division of an operational command was the USAF Southern Air Division which absorbed resources of the United States Air Forces Southern Command in 1976, and was part of Tactical Air Command.

An air division's numerical identification was usually unique to a major command, however when inactivated, the numerical identification could and was used by a different major command if it was reactivated.

During the Cuban Missile Crisis three air divisions, provisional, were organized. Air Force record cards contain the following information:

- The HQ, Air Division Provisional 1 was organized on 10 Nov 1962 at Homestead AFB, Florida, and assigned to the Air Force Provisional 33 (Fighter Reconnaissance). On 29 Nov 1962, the division was relieved from assignment to Air Force Provisional 33 and assigned directly to Tactical Air Command. At the same time, it was attached to the Air Force Atlantic (ADVON). The HQ, Air Division Provisional 1 was discontinued on 1 June 1963.
- The HQ, Air Division Provisional 2 was also organized on 10 Nov 1962 at McCoy AFB, Florida, and assigned to AF Prov 33 (Ftr Recon). On 29 Nov 1962, the division was relieved from assignment to AFProv 33 and assigned directly to Tactical Air Command, with attachment to AF Atlantic (ADVON). The division was discontinued on 1 June 1963.

Brigadier General Gilbert Meyers, commander of the 354th Tactical Fighter Wing, commanded the division at McCoy Air Force Base for a period.

- The Hq, Air Division Provisional 3 was organized on 25 Oct 1962 at MacDill AFB, Florida, and assigned to AF Prov 33 (Ftr Recon). On 29 Nov 1962, the division was relieved from assignment to 33 AF Prov 33 (Ftr Recon) and assigned directly to Tactical Air Command, with attachment to AF Atlantic (ADVON). On 1 June 1963, the division was discontinued.

During the Vietnam War air divisions were commonly used as 'placeholder' organizations when the operational wing at an Air Force Base was deployed to Southeast Asia and commanded the remaining groups and squadrons at a single or multiple Air Force bases.

Air divisions were gradually phased out of the Air Force command structure after the end of the Vietnam War, with the numbered air force assuming direct command of its subordinate wings. The last existed into the early 1990s and their usage ended with the 1992 major reorganization of the USAF major commands.

== Vietnam War ==
In Vietnam the USAF's 834th Air Division also had small Divisional lateral units called an "elements." The 834th Air Division Airlift Command Center (ALCC commonly called "mother") operated eight airlift command elements (ALCEs) throughout South Vietnam.

The ALCEs were commanded by lieutenant colonels, usually had several supervising majors, a supervising senior NCO (usually an E-7) over AFSC 27150 (mission monitors or mission controllers) E-3s to E-6s. Two famous ALCEs in South Vietnam were Rocket Alley ALCE (pronounce Al-See) at Bien Hoa AB and Sandbox ALCE at Cam Rahn Bay AB. Rocket Alley ALCE was a hard-luck combat assignment while Sandbox ALCE was only occasionally attacked. Branched off of the ALCE were TDY assignments with mobile ALCE units into the Central Highlands and other locations in country. These usually consisted of a lt. col or major, E-6 or E-7, and one or two E-4 or E-5 AFSC 271XX to coordinate C-130, C-7A, and occasional C-123 traffic on unimproved airfields. These mobile ALCE units were testing facilities for newly developed fold-up aluminum honeycomb sleeping quarters, radio rooms, and toilet facilities, all collapsible and moveable aboard a C-130.

== See also ==
- List of all Air Divisions
- Air Division Emblems in the Strategic Air Command emblem gallery
- Air Division Emblems in the Tactical Air Command emblem gallery
- Air Division Emblems in the Air (Aerospace) Defense Command emblem gallery
