= Staffel (unit) =

Military unit

A Staffel (pronounced [ˈʃtafl̩], ultimately from Proto-Germanic *stapul, "pillar") is a military organization in German-speaking militaries.

== Operational unit ==
Within Deutsche Luftwaffe a Staffel is the smallest unit that is able to operate on its own.

The NATO map symbol for this Staffel is:

== Subdivisional unit ==
NATO doctrine recognizes this Staffel as a level of command unique to Germany. Within Heer a Staffel is a unit smaller than a company but larger than a platoon, e.g. Fahrzeugstaffel (vehicle squad), Instandsetzungsstaffel (maintenance squad).

The NATO map symbol for this Staffel is:

== Luftwaffe Staffel of the Second World War ==
A Luftwaffe Staffel usually had nine to 12 operational aircraft. Three or four Staffeln comprised a Gruppe, while a single Staffel was divided into two or three operational Schwärme (singular: Schwarm), consisting of four to six aircraft.

Relative to the opposing Allied air forces, a full-strength Staffel was usually smaller than a full-strength squadron (at least 12 aircraft) and larger than a flight (usually four to six aircraft). In 1940, during the Battle of Britain, the difference in numbers – between a standard Luftwaffe fighter Staffel and a standard RAF Fighter Command squadron – led to mutual misunderstandings of their respective strengths; German leaders frequently underestimated the active strength of Fighter Command and British leaders frequently overestimated the strength of the Luftwaffe.
