= Foxhole =

Foxhole or Foxholes may refer to:

== Military ==
- Foxhole, a type of defensive fighting position

== Locations ==
- Foxholes, Hertford, an eastern suburb of Hertford
- Foxholes, North Yorkshire, a village and civil parish in Northern England
- Foxhole, Cornwall, a village in mid Cornwall
- Foxhole, Scotland, a hamlet in the Scottish Highlands
- Foxhole Heath, an area of a heathland near the village of Eriswell in Suffolk

== Media ==
- Foxhole (band), a post-rock band from Bowling Green, America
- Dugout to Foxhole, a 1994 book written by Rick Van Blair
- The Empty Foxhole, a 1967 album by the American jazz saxophonist Ornette Coleman
- "The Magic Foxhole", a 1944 unpublished short story by J.D. Salinger
- Foxhole in Cairo, a 1960 British war film
- Foxhole (film), a 2021 American war film
- Foxhole (video game), a sandbox massively multiplayer online game
- Foxhole radio, a radio built by G.I.s during World War II
- "Foxholes", a 2025 song by Lovejoy from the album One Simple Trick
- The Fox Hole, a 1967 children's novel by Ivan Southall

== Mathematics ==
- Shekel's foxholes, a test function for optimization

== Philosophy ==
- Foxhole conversion, an aphorism used to argue that in times of extreme stress or fear all people will believe in, or hope for, a higher power
