= Spider hole =

Camouflaged one-man foxhole

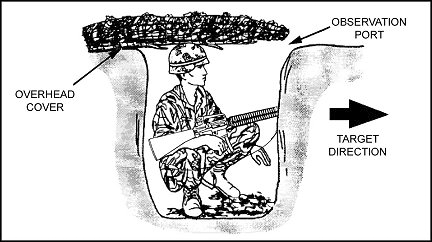
Illustration of a spider hole

A spider hole is a type of defensive fighting position, similar to a surveillance/hidesite used for observation. Spider holes are designed to camouflage people (usually soldiers) into their surrounding environment.

The position was used additionally by Viet Cong fighters during the Vietnam War. The concept grew in popularity through the war. The Viet Cong occupied the spider holes temporarily, often leaving them after a few days.

The term was also used in 2003 during the capture of Saddam Hussein, to describe his hiding position.

== Etymology ==
The term is usually understood to be an allusion to the camouflaged hole constructed by the trapdoor spider.

According to United States Marine Corps historian Major Chuck Melson, the term originated during the American Civil War, when it referred to a hastily dug foxhole.

Following the capture of Saddam Hussein, the American columnist William Safire claimed in the December 15, 2003, issue of the New York Times that the term originated in the Vietnam War. According to Safire, one of the characteristics of these holes was that they held a "clay pot large enough to hold a crouching man." If the pot broke, the soldier was exposed to attack from snakes or spiders, hence the name "spider hole".

== Construction ==
A typical spider hole was dug to a depth of about 4 feet. The camouflage was usually made from local materials. The depth of the hole depended on the height of the person using it, with about 5 feet as the width. This allowed soldiers using the hole to stand in it and sometimes sit.

A spider hole differs from a typical foxhole in that a foxhole is usually deeper and designed to emphasize cover rather than concealment. Foxholes were typically lined with sandbags, distinguishing them from spider holes, which offered less cover.

== Use ==
Spider holes were used during World War II by Japanese forces on many Pacific battlefields, including Leyte in the Philippines and Iwo Jima. They called them "octopus pots" (蛸壺, takotsubo) for a fancied resemblance to the pots used to catch octopuses in Japan.

Spider holes were used by fighters of the Viet Cong and soldiers of the People's Army of Vietnam during the Vietnam War as both defensive and offensive fortifications, where VC/PAVN fighters could either seek shelter from combat with ARVN, U.S. or other allied forces, or could conceal themselves in preparation for a surprise attack.

On December 13, 2003, during the Iraq War, American forces in Operation Red Dawn captured Iraqi president Saddam Hussein hiding in what was characterized as a "spider hole" outside an Ad-Dawr farmhouse (near his hometown of Tikrit).

== See also ==
- List of established military terms
- Trench
- Fox hole
- Shell scrape
- Trench warfare
- Defensive fighting position
