= Joe Nuxhall =

American baseball player and broadcaster (1928–2007)

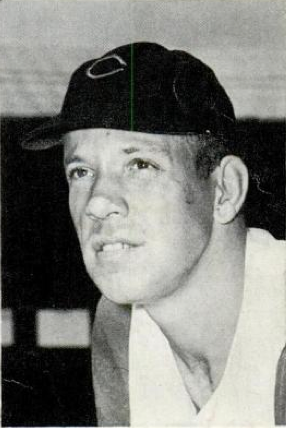
- Nuxhall in 1957
- Pitcher
- Born: July 30, 1928; Hamilton, Ohio, U.S.
- Died: November 15, 2007 (aged 79); Fairfield, Ohio, U.S.
- Batted: Left Threw: Left

MLB debut
- June 10, 1944, for the Cincinnati Reds

Last MLB appearance
- October 2, 1966, for the Cincinnati Reds

MLB statistics
- Win–loss record: 135–117
- Earned run average: 3.90
- Strikeouts: 1,372
- Stats at Baseball Reference

Teams
- Cincinnati Reds / Redlegs (1944, 1952–1960); Kansas City Athletics (1961); Los Angeles Angels (1962); Cincinnati Reds (1962–1966)

Career highlights and awards
- 2× All-Star (1955, 1956); Cincinnati Reds Hall of Fame

Joseph Henry Nuxhall (/ˈnʌkshɔːl/; July 30, 1928 – November 15, 2007) was an American left-handed pitcher in Major League Baseball, best remembered for having been the youngest player ever to appear in a Major League game and for spending 40 years as a Cincinnati Reds broadcaster.

Nuxhall played primarily for the Cincinnati Reds. Immediately after retiring as a player, he became a radio broadcaster for the Reds from 1967 through 2004, and continued part-time up until his death in 2007. Nuxhall held the team's record for career games pitched (484) from 1965 to 1975, and still holds the team mark for left-handers. He pitched 2/3 of an inning for the Reds on June 10, 1944, at the age of 15 years, 316 days. Called upon for that single game due to player shortages during World War II, Nuxhall eventually found his way back to the Reds in 1952, and the National League All-Star team in 1955 and 1956. Long known as "The Ol' Left-hander," he compiled a career earned run average of 3.90 and a record of 135–117 during his 16-season career, with all but five of his victories being earned with the Reds. Nuxhall died in 2007 after a long battle with cancer.

== Early life ==
Nuxhall was born and raised in Hamilton, Ohio. During World War II, many regular baseball players were unavailable while serving in the military. Meanwhile, Nuxhall was the biggest member of the ninth grade class in Hamilton at 6 feet 2 inches (1.88 m) and 190 pounds (86 kg)—a left-hander with a hard fastball, but not much control. Nuxhall was playing in a semi-pro league with his father for a few years. Scouts looking to fill out the Reds' depleted roster were following Orville Nuxhall, Joe's father, in 1943. But they were informed that the elder Nuxhall was not interested in signing a professional contract because of his five children. The scouts then became interested in Joe, who was only 14 at the time. After waiting until the following year's basketball season was over, Nuxhall signed a major league contract with the Reds on February 18, 1944. General manager Warren Giles intended to wait until school was over in June to add him to the team, but more of his players were inducted into the service in the spring. With permission from his high school principal, Nuxhall was in uniform with the team on Opening Day.

== Teenage debut ==
I was pitching against seventh-, eighth- and ninth-graders, kids 13 and 14 years old... All of a sudden, I look up and there's Stan Musial and the likes. It was a very scary situation.

On June 10, 1944, the Reds were playing the first place (and eventual World Series champions) St. Louis Cardinals at Crosley Field and were trailing 13–0 in the ninth inning when Manager Bill McKechnie called on Nuxhall for mop-up relief. He started well, retiring the first batter he faced, shortstop George Fallon, on a groundout. But he was unable to get out of the inning, yielding five walks, two hits, one wild pitch and five runs. He spent the rest of the 1944 season in the minor leagues. But unlike Jake Eisenhart, who made his debut for the Reds the same day by getting the last out of the frame but didn't return to the major league level after 1944, Nuxhall later returned to pitch in the majors eight years later in 1952.

Nuxhall remains the youngest individual to play in a major league game in history. During Nuxhall's lifetime, it was believed that a 14-year-old named Fred Chapman pitched five innings in one 1887 game. But in 2009, the Society for American Baseball Research discovered that Chapman's first name and age were both incorrect. The 1887 player was actually named Frank Chapman, and he was 25 at the time of his only major league appearance. There have also been sources listing a Billy Geer, who played for the 1874 New York Mutuals of the National Association, as being born in 1859; but this is questionable as well, as is whether the National Association was a major league.

Joe Reliford, a 12-year-old batboy for the Class D Fitzgerald Pioneers, became the youngest person ever to play in a professional baseball game in 1952, when he was called on to pinch-hit.

== Minor leagues ==
Following his appearance with the Reds, he was assigned to the Birmingham Barons in the Southern League, but pitched only a third of an inning there (he struck out his first batter, then allowed a hit, five walks, a hit batter and five runs). Nuxhall attended spring training with the Reds in 1945. After school ended that spring, he pitched in the Reds minor league system for one season. Nuxhall then decided to return home until he finished high school the following year. He regained his amateur status and played football, basketball and baseball for Hamilton High School as a senior in 1945–‘46, earning all-state honors in football and basketball. Over the next five years, he played in the minor leagues with the Syracuse Chiefs, Lima Reds, Muncie Reds, Columbia Reds, Charleston Senators and Tulsa Oilers before returning to the Cincinnati Reds in 1952. He briefly returned to the minors in 1962 with the San Diego Padres.

== Return to the major leagues ==
At the age of 23, Nuxhall returned to the majors. He pitched the final three innings of a 19–1 shellacking by the Brooklyn Dodgers on May 21, 1952, allowing one hit and no runs. Four days later, he took over for Herm Wehmeier in the fourth inning against the St. Louis Cardinals, but he allowed two runs on six hits in five innings of work and was credited with the 7–6 loss, his first in the majors. On July 13, he made his first career start against the New York Giants. In nine innings of work, he allowed four runs on nine hits, striking out two and walking three, but the Reds lost 4–2. A month later, he received his first win when he pitched three innings in relief of Harry Perkowski as the Reds rallied in the ninth to win 5–4 over the New York Giants. He allowed two hits and one run while striking out and walking two each. Ultimately, Nuxhall played in 37 games, going 1–4 with a 3.22 ERA in 92 1/3 innings, having one save while striking out 52 with 42 walks. In the fielding, he had 24 assists with three putouts and one error and four double plays for a .964 fielding percentage. The following year, he went 9–11 with a 4.32 ERA, having five complete games and two saves in 141 2/3 innings. He had 69 walks and 52 strikeouts. In batting, he had 49 at-bats in 30 games, batting .327 (a career high), having 16 hits and three home runs with eight RBIs, four walks and 13 strikeouts. In fielding, he had six putouts, 18 assists, three errors on a .889 fielding percentage. The next year, he improved to 12–5 with a 3.89 ERA in 35 games and 166 2/3 innings. He had five complete games while having 59 walks and 85 strikeouts. He had four putouts, 29 assists, one error and five double plays for a .971 fielding percentage. He ranked 9th in strikeouts per 9 innings at 4.590, the first of five times he ranked in the top ten over nine seasons. He also ranked in the top ten in strikeouts/walks with 1.441 (9th) and 0.594 in home runs per 9 innings (4th)

Nuxhall blossomed in 1955, going 17–12 with a 3.47 ERA on 257 innings with five shutouts (a career and league high) while striking out 98 and walking 78. He had 12 putouts, 35 assists, three errors, four double plays for a .940 fielding percentage. He was named to the All-Star Game that year. He pitched 3 1/3 innings while allowing two hits and no runs with three walks and five strikeouts. Nuxhall ranked in the top ten in numerous categories in the National League that season, such as ERA (7th), wins (3rd), walks & hits per inning (1.237, 7th), innings pitched (2nd), walks (5th), and hits (4th with 240).

The following year, he went 13–11 with a 3.72 ERA in 200 2/3 innings and 44 games, having three saves while throwing 10 complete games. He struck out 120 while walking 87 (a career high). He had six putouts, 31 assists, two errors and three double plays for a .949 fielding percentage. He was named to the All-Star Game once again, although he did not pitch. Nuxhall ranked in the top ten of a few categories in the NL, such as strikeouts (10th), strikeouts per nine innings (5.382, 4th), and walks (4th). The 91–63 record and 3rd-place finish by the Redlegs (in which they finished two games behind the Brooklyn Dodgers). This was the closest Nuxhall came to postseason action.

He stumbled the following year, going 10–10 with a 4.75 ERA in 39 games and 174 1/3 innings. He had 99 strikeouts and 53 walks. He had 11 putouts, 20 assists, four errors (a league high), and one double play turned for a .886 fielding percentage. He improved in 1958, going 12–11 for a 3.79 ERA in 36 games and 175 2/3 innings. He had 111 strikeouts and 63 walks. He had six putouts, 29 assists, with three errors and double plays turned each on a .921 fielding percentage. He ranked sixth in hits per nine innings with 8.658 (10th) and strikeouts per nine innings with 5.687 (6th). The following year, he went 9–9 with a 4.24 ERA and one save in 29 games and 131 2/3 innings. He had 75 strikeouts and 35 walks. He had six putouts, 19 assists, with one error and double play turned for a .962 fielding percentage. For 1960, he did not have the success of the past few years, going 1–8 with a 4.42 ERA in 38 games and 112 innings. He had 72 strikeouts and 27 walks. He had eight putouts, 26 assists, one error and four double plays for a .971 fielding percentage.

On January 25, 1961, he was traded by the Reds to the Kansas City Athletics for John Briggs and John Tsitouris. In his one season with Kansas City, he went 5–8 with a 5.34 ERA in 37 games and 128 innings with one save, striking out 81 while walking 65. He had his second highest batting average at .292 in 65 at-bats, hitting 19 times while having two home runs and 13 RBIs, striking out 18 times while walking six times. He had 10 putouts, 13 assists, three errors and one double play for a .885 fielding percentage. On December 4, he was released by the Athletics.

He signed as a free agent with the Baltimore Orioles for the 1962 season, but on April 9, 1962 (one day before the season started), he was purchased by the Los Angeles Angels. In five games with the team, he had a 10.13 ERA while having no wins or losses, pitching 5 1/3 innings while allowing seven hits, six runs, five walks, and two strikeouts. On May 15, he was released. He signed back with the Reds roughly a month later. He went 5–0 with the Reds in twelve games for a 2.45 ERA with one save in 66 innings, striking out 57 while walking 25.

Nuxhall improved for the 1963 season, going 15–8 with a career low 2.61 ERA in 35 games and 217 1/3 innings (the second most inning work in his career). He had a career high 169 strikeouts along with 39 walks. He had five putouts, 33 assists, five errors and two double plays for a .884 fielding percentage. He won his 100th career game on June 29, beating the San Francisco Giants 7–3, pitching nine innings while allowing seven hits, two walks and 11 strikeouts.

Nuxhall regressed slightly the following year, going 9–8 with a 4.07 ERA in 32 games and 154 2/3 innings, striking out 111 while walking 51. He had five putouts, 20 assists, two errors and one double play turned for a .926 fielding percentage.

For 1965, he went 11–4 with a 3.45 ERA in 32 games and 148 2/3 innings, striking out 117 while walking 31 batters. He had five putouts, 13 assists, with no errors and no double plays for a 1.000 fielding percentage. On July 30, he pitched in his 441th game for the Reds, passing the team record of 440 games pitched by Eppa Rixey. In a nine inning effort, he allowed eight hits with one runs, eight strikeouts and no walks in a 5–1 win. Nuxhall's final mark of 484 stood until Clay Carroll surpassed it in 1975.

The 1966 season (his 16th season along with his 15th for the Reds) proved to be his last in the majors. He went 6–8 with a 4.50 ERA in 35 games and 130 innings. He struck out 71 and walked 42 batters. He had six putouts, 20 assists, three errors, and one double play for a .897 fielding percentage. His final pitching appearance was on October 2, 1966, against the Atlanta Braves. He pitched in relief of Sammy Ellis in the top of the eighth inning with two outs and the Braves having taken the lead one batter earlier. Facing George Kopacz, Nuxhall got the batter to hit a flyball for an out to end the inning. He was replaced by Don Nottebart for the ninth inning.

Nuxhall was a better than average hitting pitcher in his major league career, posting a .198 batting average (152-for-766) with 76 runs, 15 home runs and 78 RBI. He also drew 40 bases on balls.

== Broadcasting career ==
Nuxhall announced his retirement as an active player on April 1, 1967. Under the guidance of Hamilton sports broadcaster Ray Motley, he immediately joined the Reds broadcast team despite his lack of broadcasting experience.

Part of his trademark radio sign-off phrase—"This is the old left-hander, rounding third and heading for home"—is displayed on the outside of the Reds' stadium, Great American Ball Park, which opened in 2003. A likeness of Nuxhall is one of eight statues sculpted by Tom Tsuchiya that decorate the main entrance of the stadium (The others are Ernie Lombardi, Ted Kluszewski, Frank Robinson, Johnny Bench, Joe Morgan, Tony Perez, and Pete Rose).

Nuxhall was elected to the Cincinnati Reds Hall of Fame in 1968, and officially retired from the Reds on October 3, 2004, 60 years after his pitching debut, though he still made guest appearances on some game broadcasts. For many years after retiring as a player and during his broadcasting career, Nuxhall pitched batting practice for the Reds. In addition to being called "Nuxy" and "the ole lefthander", Nuxhall was also known as "Hamilton Joe", particularly to locals. He spent nearly 62 of his 64 baseball seasons in the Reds organization as a minor-league player, major-league player or an announcer from 1944 to 2007; the only exceptions being 1946 (when he was on the "voluntarily retired" list—in reality, he went back to high school), 1961 (when he was dealt to the Kansas City A's) and 1962 (pitching for a few weeks with the Los Angeles Angels, then half a season with the Reds' PCL farm club in San Diego before heading back to Cincinnati).

On June 6, 2007, the Reds honored Nuxhall, Marty Brennaman, and Waite Hoyt with replica microphones that hang on the wall near the radio booth. At Redsfest in December, 2007 the Reds announced Nuxhall would be honored throughout the 2008 baseball season—their uniforms would display a dark patch with the word "NUXY" printed in white. On March 31, 2008, the Cincinnati Reds paid tribute to Nuxhall by wearing his #41 jersey for opening day.

In December 2007, Nuxhall was named as one of the ten finalists for the National Baseball Hall of Fame's Ford C. Frick Award, an honor bestowed annually on broadcasters who make major contributions to the game of baseball. Of more than 122,000 online ballots cast by fans, Nuxhall received 82,304 votes. Despite this show of support, it was announced on February 19, 2008, that the Frick election committee had voted in favor of the voice of the Seattle Mariners play-by-play announcer Dave Niehaus.

== Book and character education fund ==
In September 2004, Orange Frazer Press released Joe: Rounding Third & Heading for Home. A portion of the proceeds from the book benefits the Joe Nuxhall Character Education Fund, which was established in 2003 to underwrite character development programs and projects for children.

== Community remembrance ==
In the days following Nuxhall's death, several radio stations in the Cincinnati area devoted shows to him, and fans left cards, flowers and banners at the statue of Nuxhall at Great American Ball Park. A public visitation ceremony was attended by thousands of fans and several local and national sports and broadcasting personalities. At his visitation held at Fairfield High School, an estimated 6,000 people showed up to pay their respects to Nuxhall and the Nuxhall family. The Hamilton Joes, a collegiate summer baseball team that competes in the Great Lakes Summer Collegiate League, was founded in 2008 and named in his honor. They first began playing in 2009 and won their first league championship in 2016.

== 2008 Opening Day memorial ==
The Reds remembered Nuxhall on their 2008 Opening Day. Players wore an alternate jersey during their introductions, which bore the number 41 and Nuxhall's name on the back. Aaron Harang, who usually wore the number 39 jersey, was allowed by MLB to wear the number 41 jersey with Nuxhall's name for the entire game. Nuxhall's number 41 was honored by the team displaying it in left-center field over the Reds' bullpen. Reds players wore patches with "Nuxy" and his number 41 on them as a tribute.

== See also ==
- List of baseball players who went directly to Major League Baseball
- List of Major League Baseball all-time leaders in home runs by pitchers
- List of Major League Baseball single-inning strikeout leaders

== Bibliography ==
- Bob Rathgeber (1982). Cincinnati Reds Scrapbook. JCP Corp. of Virginia. ISBN 0-938694-05-7
- Lonnie Wheeler and John Baskin (1988). The Cincinnati Game. Orange Frazer Press. ISBN 0-9619637-1-9
- Rick Van Blair (1994). Dugout to Foxhole: Interviews with Baseball Players Whose Careers Were Affected by World War II. McFarland & Company, Inc. ISBN 0-7864-0017-X
- Greg Rhodes and John Snyder (2000). Redleg Journal: Year by Year and Day by Day with the Cincinnati Reds Since 1866. Road West Publishing. ISBN 0-9641402-5-X
- Van Blair, Rick (1994). Dugout to Foxhole: Interviews with Baseball Players Whose Careers Were Affected by World War II. Jefferson, North Carolina: McFarland & Company Publishers.
