= Foxhole Heath =

Protected heathland in Suffolk, England

Coordinates: 52.37°N 0.55°E

Foxhole Heath, Eriswell
- Site of Special Scientific Interest
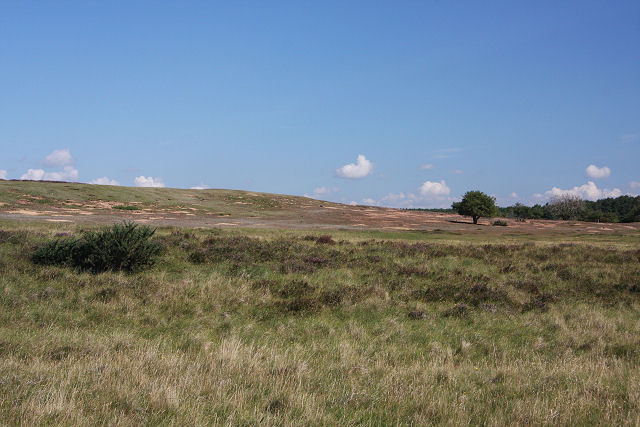
- Location of Foxhole Heath, Eriswell.
- Area of search: Suffolk
- Interest: Biological
- Area: 85.2 hectares
- Notification date: 1983
- Location map: Magic Map

Foxhole Heath is an 85.2-hectare (211-acre) biological Site of Special Scientific Interest east of Eriswell in Suffolk. It is a Nature Conservation Review site, Grade I, and part of Breckland Special Area of Conservation and Breckland Special Protection Area under the European Union Directive on the Conservation of Wild Birds.

The site is heathland and its vascular plant flora includes the following species: slender cudweed Filago minima, shepherd's cress Teesdalia nudicaulis, bird's-foot, Ornithopus perpusillus, sand sedge Carex arenaria, purple milk vetch Astragalus danicus, common centaury Centaurium erythraea, sheep's-bit Jasione montana and larger wild thyme Thymus pulegioides. There are three nationally rare plants. It has a breeding population of the rare stone-curlew, and this species also uses the site to gather prior to its autumn migration.

The road verge along the south side is included in Suffolk County Council's protected road verges scheme.

There is access from the B1112 road.
