= Shell scrape =

Earthwork for shelter from shell fire

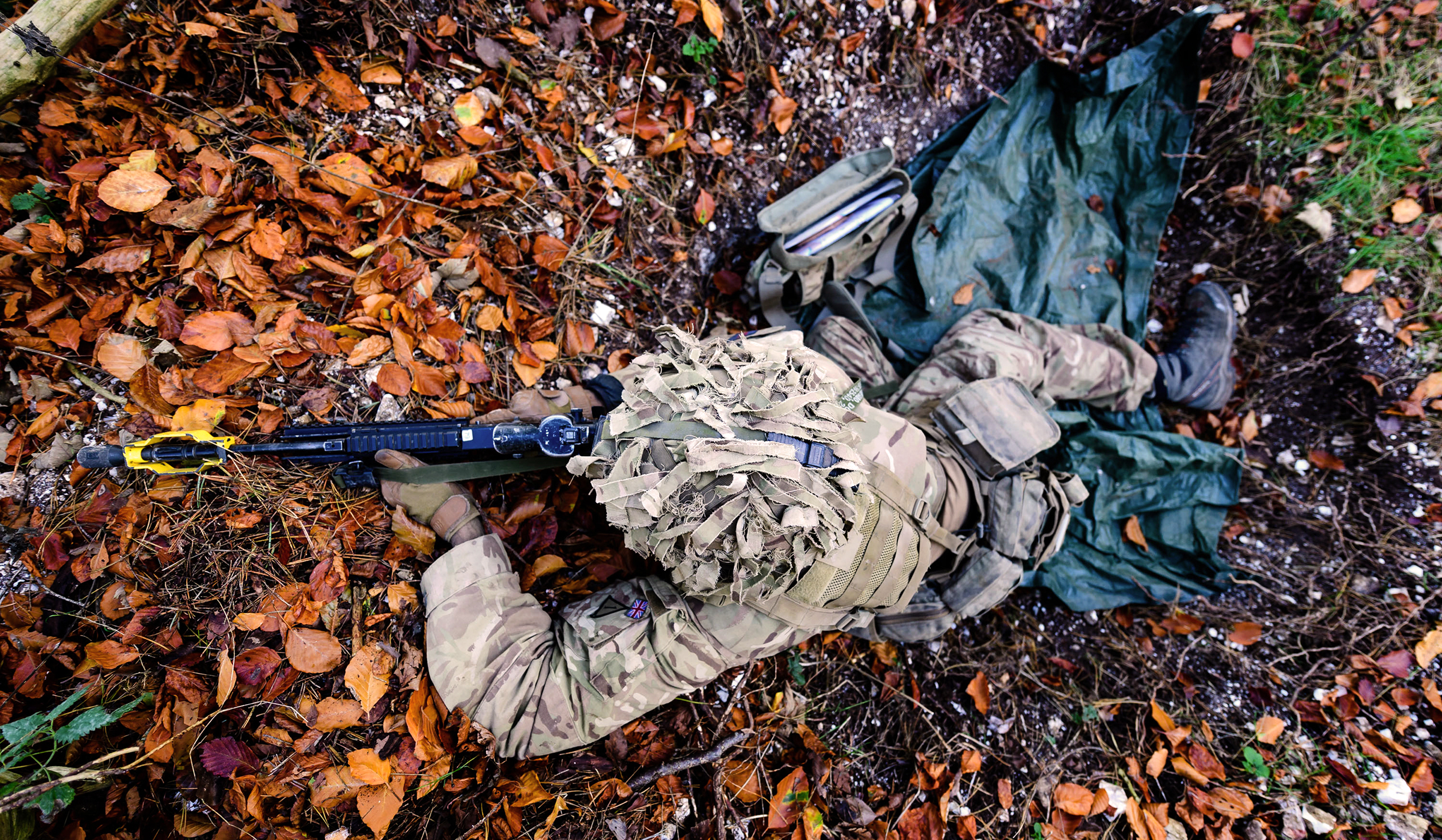
A British soldier lying prone in a shell scrape during a training exercise in 2016

A shell scrape is a type of military earthwork dug at a shallow but sufficient depth in the ground where a soldier can take shelter from weapons fire. While similar to a defensive fighting position in that the purpose is to shield a single soldier from artillery, mortar and direct small arms fire, it is not intended to be used for fighting from.

Shell scrapes are generally hastily excavated manually, with immediately available means such as the entrenching tool, and are temporary constructions. They are shallow, and large enough to accommodate at least a single soldier lying down or kneeling. In some situations they can be dug to accommodate two soldiers and their equipment. For protection from the elements a poncho is often tied off or staked out at the edges, or bungeed to a nearby tree. This way a soldier can sleep in the shell scrape more comfortably with cover overhead.

Shell scrapes offer better concealment than traditional tarp bivouacs because the majority of the soldier's body mass is below ground level. This catches their body heat, making them harder to spot with thermal imagers.

A properly prepared shell scrape should be deep enough that the soldier's entire body is beneath the level of the surrounding ground, thereby offering protection from both direct- and indirect-fire weapons. However, it provides little protection against indirect fire that bursts in the air or among the trees.
