= Foxholes, Hertford =

Suburb of Hertford, England

Coordinates: 51°47′38″N 0°3′15″W

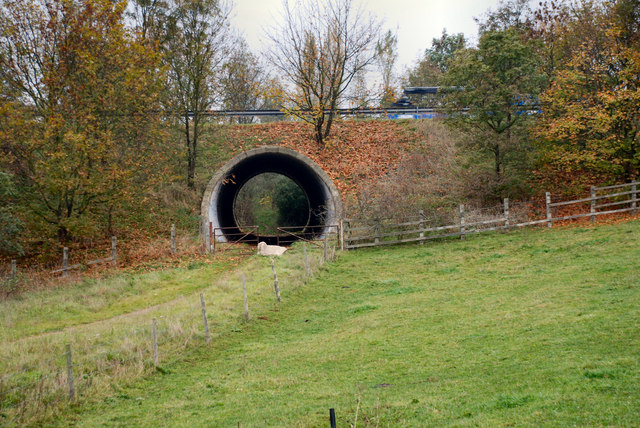
Near Foxholes Farm

Foxholes is an eastern suburb of Hertford, Hertfordshire, England. It is situated to the north of the older Foxholes Farm, which over the years has served as the headquarters for the regional Eastern Hertfordshire Archaeological Group, which works in close collaboration with the Hertford Museum. The farm has a shop and café.

The modern housing estate sits on the site of an old gravel pit, known as Foxholes Quarry.

== History ==
Archaeologists in the vicinity unearthed finds indicating occupation in the late Romano-British period. The findings revealed that there were three principal phases of Roman occupation in the area, from ditch construction in the 1st–2nd centuries, a farmstead from the 2nd–4th century with a cemetery and corn-drying ovens, and a phase of pottery production in the 4th century. There is also evidence of buildings being constructed in Foxholes in the early-mid Saxon period from the 6th to 8th centuries, with sunken-floored buildings being discovered.
