= Dugout to Foxhole =

1994 book by Rick Van Blair

- Author: Rick Van Blair
- Cover artist: Pinky May (photo)
- Language: English
- Genre: Non-fiction
- Published: 1988 McFarland & Company
- Publication place: United States
- Media type: Print (paperback)
- Pages: 226
- ISBN: 0-7864-0017-X
- Dewey Decimal: 796.35709
- LC Class: GV865.A1 V36 1994

Dugout to Foxhole: Interviews with Baseball Players Whose Careers Were Affected by World War II is a 1994 book written by Rick Van Blair. The book has been cited as a reference source for other baseball books.

== Book Summary ==
The book contains interviews with the following players:

- Dick Bartell – Infielder with the Pittsburgh Pirates, New York Giants and the Detroit Tigers. Bartell had a reputation as a "rowdy" and excitable player. Not mentioned in the book, Bartell served in the U.S. Navy from 1943 to 1945.
- Jimmy Bloodworth – Primarily a second baseman, Bloodworth played every position in the game during his career except pitcher and catcher. Teams that Bloodworth played for included the Washington Senators, Detroit Tigers, Pittsburgh Pirates, Cincinnati Reds, and Philadelphia Phillies. Bloodworth's military service is not discussed in Van Blair's book, but he served in the U.S. Army as a combat engineer from 1943 to 1946. Bloodworth's time in the service was spent wholly at Fort Leonard Wood, Missouri. Bloodworth died at the age of 85 in Apalachicola, Florida.
- Mace Brown – A native of North English, Iowa, Brown played for the Pittsburgh Pirates, Brooklyn Dodgers, and Boston Red Sox. During his career, Brown served in the U.S. Navy from 1944 to 1945, and was stationed on a number of islands in the Pacific area, to include Guam. A relief pitcher, Brown is best remembered for giving up a walk off home run to Gabby Hartnett that allowed the Chicago Cubs to take the 1938 National League pennant from the Pirates. Known as the Homer in the Gloamin', the play haunted Brown for the remainder of his life. After his career ended, Brown worked as a scout for the Red Sox and signed Hall of Fame player Jim Rice. In 1992, Brown died in Greensboro, North Carolina at the age of 92.
- Harry Craft – Craft played center field for the Cincinnati Reds from 1937 to 1942 and was a member of their World Series teams in 1939 and 1940. Craft served in the Navy from 1942 to 1946. After his military service time was over, Craft returned to baseball but never made it back to the major leagues. In 1948, Craft began a second career as a manager, managing at both the minor and major league levels to include managing the expansion Houston Colt .45s for their first three years. In 1995, Craft died in Conroe, Texas at the age of 80.
- Harry Danning – A four time all-star Danning was one of baseball's premier catchers in the 1930s. He spent his entire career with the New York Giants and played on their 1936 and 1937 World Series teams. Nicknamed "The Horse", Danning served in the U.S. Army from 1943 to 1946. In 2004, Danning died at the age of 93 in Valparaiso, Indiana.

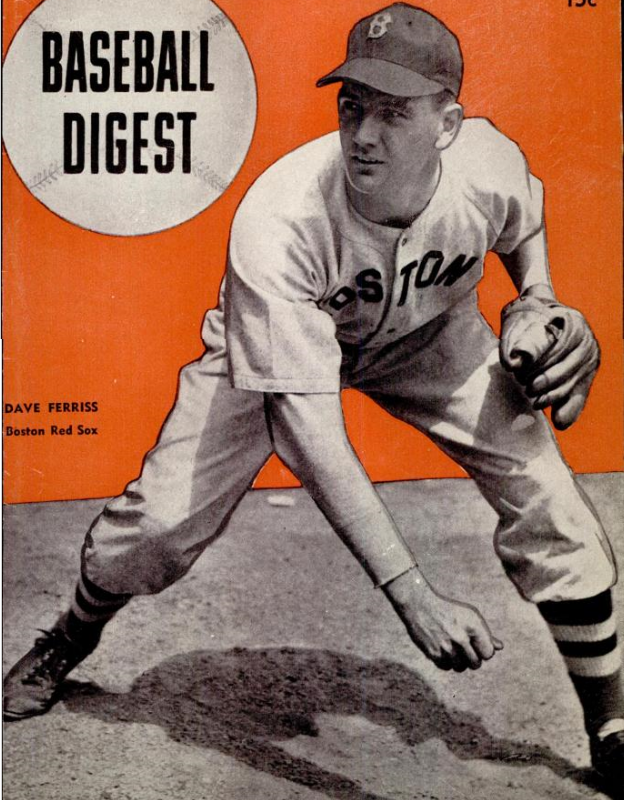
After a remarkable debut, injuries curtailed Boo Ferriss' career, he later attained great success as a collegiate baseball coach.

- Boo Ferriss – Starting with a 21 win rookie season in 1945, Ferriss had a remarkable first two years as a major league pitcher before injuring his arm in 1947, an injury that effectively ended his career. Not mentioned in Van Blair's book is that Ferriss was drafted into the Army in 1942. For three years, Ferriss was a physical fitness instructor at Randolph Field in Texas before being discharged for a worsening asthmatic condition in 1945. After a brief stint as a pitching coach for the Red Sox, Ferriss returned to his native Mississippi and was hired as the baseball coach for Delta State University, a position he held for 26 years. Ferriss has received numerous honors in his life and is a member of both the Boston Red Sox Hall of Fame and the Mississippi Sports Hall of Fame. As of 2013, Ferriss, 91, was living in retirement in Mississippi.
- Harry Gumbert – Gumbert's fifteen-year career as a pitcher stretched from 1935 to 1950. During that time, he played for the New York Giants, St. Louis Cardinals, Cincinnati Reds, and Pittsburgh Pirates. Gumbert was drafted into the Army in 1942 but was never deployed to either theater of operations and instead served stateside at a prisoner of war camp. Gumbert was thirty seven when he was drafted and had five brothers in the military during the war. After the war ended he returned to the Reds. Gumbert died at the age of 85 in Wimberley, Texas in 1995.
- Ernie Koy – Nicknamed "Chief" due to his American Indian ancestry, between 1938 and 1942 Koy played left field for the Brooklyn Dodgers, St. Louis Cardinals, Cincinnati Reds, and Philadelphia Phillies. Koy left baseball in 1942 to join the U.S. Navy and fight in World War II. Despite his successful career in the major leagues, after the war ended, Koy retired from baseball and returned to his Texas farm. A graduate of the University of Texas, when Koy died in 2007 at the age of 97, he was characterized by university's alumni magazine as "... one of the school's first superstar athletes." Koy was a member of both the Texas Longhorn Hall of Honor as well as the Texas Sports Hall of Fame.
- Bob Kuzava – A left handed pitcher, Kuzava played for eight teams during his eleven-year major league career that began in 1946 and ended in 1957. Included in his career highlights were key saves that helped the New York Yankees win the 1951 and 1952 World Series. Prior to his major league career, Kuzava served for three years in the military as a military policeman.
- Buddy Lewis – Lewis graduated from high school at the top of his class and was accepted to West Point. When told he would have to give up baseball because of a service commitment following graduation, he turned down the appointment. Subsequently, Lewis spent his entire 11-year career with the Washington Senators, retiring from the game in 1949 with a .297 lifetime batting average. His career was significantly impacted by the four years he spent in World War II and after his return to baseball, he never attained the level of success he experienced prior to 1942.

"I was drafted in 1941 and they gave me a deferment to finish the 1941 season. They were waiting at the ball park door for me when it ended, and I said bye-bye. I was the first one in the first draft in my county. I missed all of 1942, 1943, 1944 and almost all of 1945. I could have played ball in the service but I had the flying bug. When I found out I was going to be drafted, I enlisted in the air corps because I wanted to fly. I went overseas to China, Burma and India. I flew a C-47 over the jungles. Let me tell you, you didn’t want to go down in the jungles. They gave me two bits of advice [if I crashed] … if I survived, to come out of the plane with a baseball in my hand. I’m serious. They told me it might save my life because the Japanese love baseball and they will take care of you … fortunately, I never crashed." – Interview with Rick Van Blair

After his retirement, Lewis returned to his home in Gastonia, North Carolina where he operated a car dealership for 30 years and coached American Legion Baseball teams. In 2011, Lewis died at the age of 94 in Gastonia.

- Dario Lodigiani – Growing up in San Francisco, Lodigiani was personal friends with the DiMaggio family and played baseball with Joe and Dom DiMaggio. During his career, he played for the Philadelphia Athletics and Chicago White Sox. Lodigiani spent three years in the Army Air Corps during World War II. After his career as a ball player ended, Lodigiani worked for the White Sox in various capacities until his death in 2008.
- Pinky May – May played third base for the Philadelphia Phillies from 1939 to 1943. He served in the U.S. Navy from 1944 to 1945. After the war ended, arm trouble precluded his return to the major leagues. May died in Corydon, Indiana in 2000 at the age of 89. May's photo is featured on the cover of Van Blair's book.
- Terry Moore – A center fielder, Moore was the captain of many of the World Series winning St. Louis Cardinals teams he played on from 1935 to 1948 and is described by Van Blair as "...perhaps the greatest center fielder of all time." He missed three years of baseball due to his military commitment which is not discussed in any detail in Van Blair's book. Moore died in Collinsville, Illinois, in 1995.

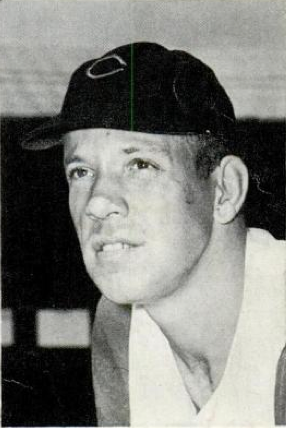
Nuxhall did not serve in World War II, but the shortage of baseball players during the war years led to his appearance in a game at the age of 15.

- Joe Nuxhall – At the age of 15, Nuxhall became the youngest player in the history of major league baseball when he pitched 2/3 of an inning for the Cincinnati Reds in 1944. Nuxhall had been recruited out of high school by the Reds as a result of the shortage of players caused by World War II. Nuxhall himself did not serve in the military during the war. After his brief appearance for the Reds, Nuxhall returned to school and did not appear in the major leagues again until 1952 when he returned to Cincinnati as a pitcher. After Nuxhall's career ended in 1966 he became a broadcaster for the Reds, a position he held until 2007 when he died of cancer at the age of 79.
- Johnny Pesky – A shortstop for the Boston Red Sox, Pesky was a teammate of Hall of Fame players Ted Williams and Bobby Doerr and played on the pennant winning 1946 Red Sox team. At the end of his 10-year career, Pesky also played for the Detroit Tigers and Washington Senators. Pesky later returned to the Red Sox as a coach, manager, and radio and television analyst. He maintained a continuous professional affiliation with the Red Sox from 1969 until his death in 2012 at the age of 92. Although Pesky served in the U.S. Navy from 1943 to 1945, it is not mentioned in Van Blair's book.
- Goody Rosen – Rosen was a Canadian who played for the Brooklyn Dodgers from 1937 to 1939 when he was sent back to the minor leagues. The shortage of ball players caused by the war time draft allowed Rosen another chance to play at the major league level and he returned to the Dodgers for the 1943–1946 seasons. Rosen did not serve in the military. Rosen died at the age of 89 in 1994.
- Warren Sandel – Sandel spent most of his playing time at the minor league level. A pitcher, Sandel is best remembered for giving up the first base hit to Jackie Robinson who broke professional baseball's color barrier in 1946 while playing under a minor league contract for the Brooklyn Dodgers. Sandel's role in Jackie Robinson's story was highlighted in the 2013 book The Victory Season: The End of World War II and the Birth of Baseball's Golden Age. Sandel, who spent three years in the Coast Guard during World War II, died in 1993 at the age of 72.
- Junior Thompson – A National League pitcher, Thompson spent six seasons at the major league level, playing for the Cincinnati Reds and New York Giants. As a member of the Reds, Thompson played in the 1939 and 1940 World Series. Not discussed in Van Blair's book was Thompson's military service in the U.S. Navy from 1944 to 1945. In 2006, Thompson died at the age of 89 in Scottsdale, Arizona.
- 1942 St. Louis Cardinals – interviews with Harry Walker, Max Lanier, Johnny Hopp, Marty Marion, Terry Moore, Enos Slaughter, and Whitey Kurowski. In his book, Van Blair refers to the team as "Baseball's First World Champions of the War."

== Reviews ==
Dugout to Foxhole has not been widely reviewed. Steven Riess, writing in the Journal of Sport History, mentions Van Blair's book while discussing baseball oral history projects. Riess' comment was that Van Blair's book contained very little discussion of the players war time experiences.
