= The Magic Foxhole =

- Short story by J. D. Salinger
- Country: United States
- Language: English

Publication
- Published in: Unpublished

"The Magic Foxhole" is an unpublished short story by J. D. Salinger.

== Plot ==
The story, told in the first-person by a narrator named Garrity, takes place days after D-Day. Garrity describes a friend of his, another soldier named Gardner, who is suffering from battle fatigue. Gardner is in the hospital, hallucinating. He sees a soldier in his room dressed in a futuristic uniform with weaponry he does not recognize. Garrity finds out that the soldier he sees is in fact Gardner's son (who has not been born yet) about to go into combat during World War III. Gardner tells Garrity he must kill him, to prevent him from dying in combat and hopefully preventing the future war. The story ends abruptly with Garrity leaving the hospital, while Gardner screams in horror.

== History ==
“‘The Magic Foxhole’ is a strong condemnation of war and one that could have been written only by a soldier…Its message countered the propaganda common in 1944 with a frankness that could have been interpreted as subversive…Even had this story slipped by the military censors, it is hard to imagine a publisher with the courage to print it.”—Biographer Kenneth Slawenski in J. D. Salinger: A Life (2010)

The 21 page story was written in 1944 while Salinger was in the service during D-Day “the first he wrote while on the front line and the only work in which he depicted active combat.” and was submitted to The New Yorker but rejected. The story is noteworthy for its graphic descriptions of the combat during the D-Day invasion. Salinger noted in at least one letter he believed the piece was a demonstration of the "psychological drama" he began to place in his character's heads, particularly war veterans. He had a high opinion of the piece, which will not be published until 2060, and after much discussion it was planned to be included in the collection he arranged with Whit Burnett and Story Press' Lippincott imprint, but the deal fell through, much to the author's consternation.

== Sources ==
- Slawenski, Kenneth. 2010. J. D. Salinger: A Life. Random House, New York. ISBN 978-1-4000-6951-4
