= Defensive fighting position =

Type of earthwork constructed in a military context

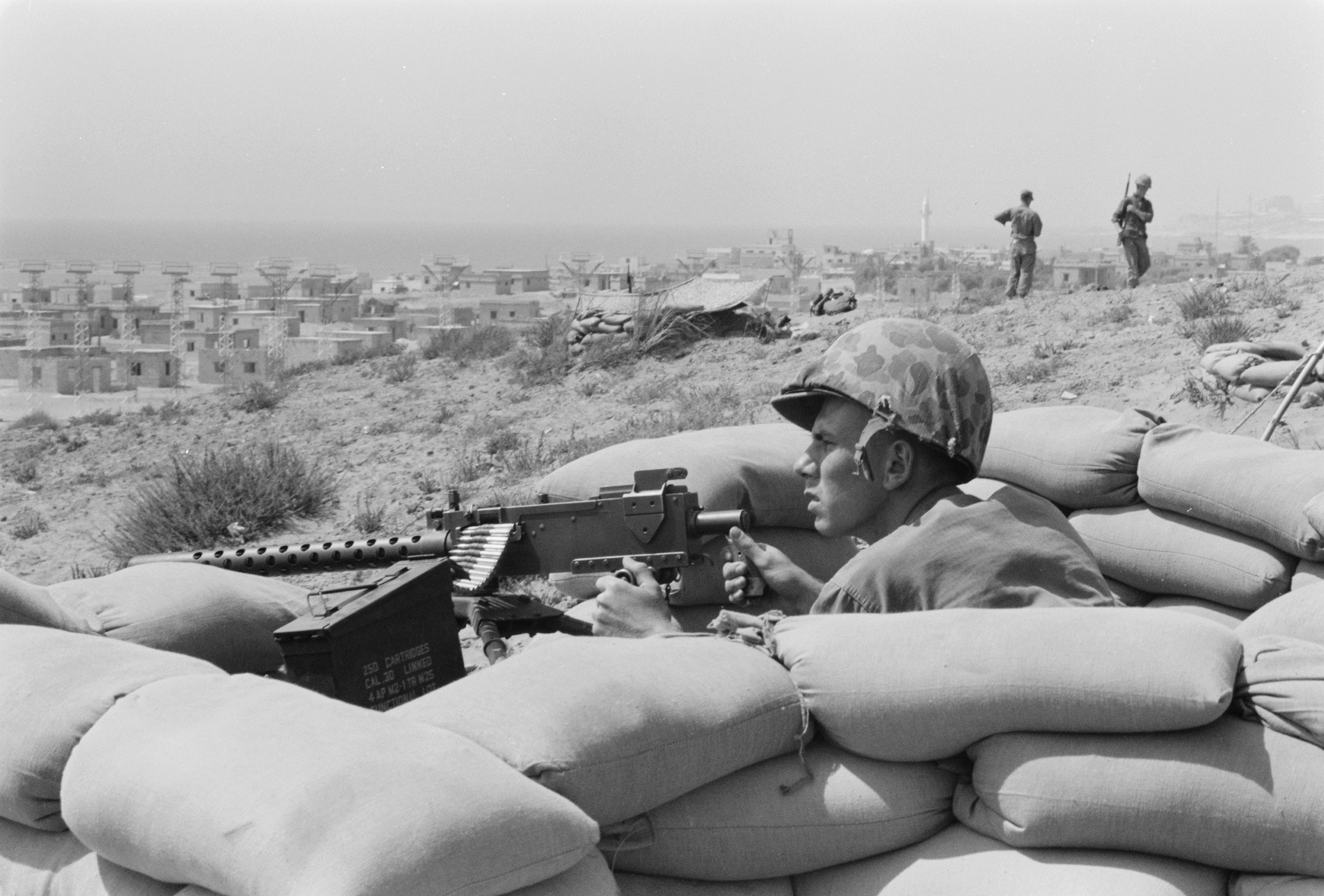
U.S. Marine in a fighting hole outside Beirut during the 1958 Lebanon crisis

A defensive fighting position is a type of earthwork constructed in a military context, generally large enough to accommodate anything from one soldier to a fire team (or similar sized unit).

== Terminology ==
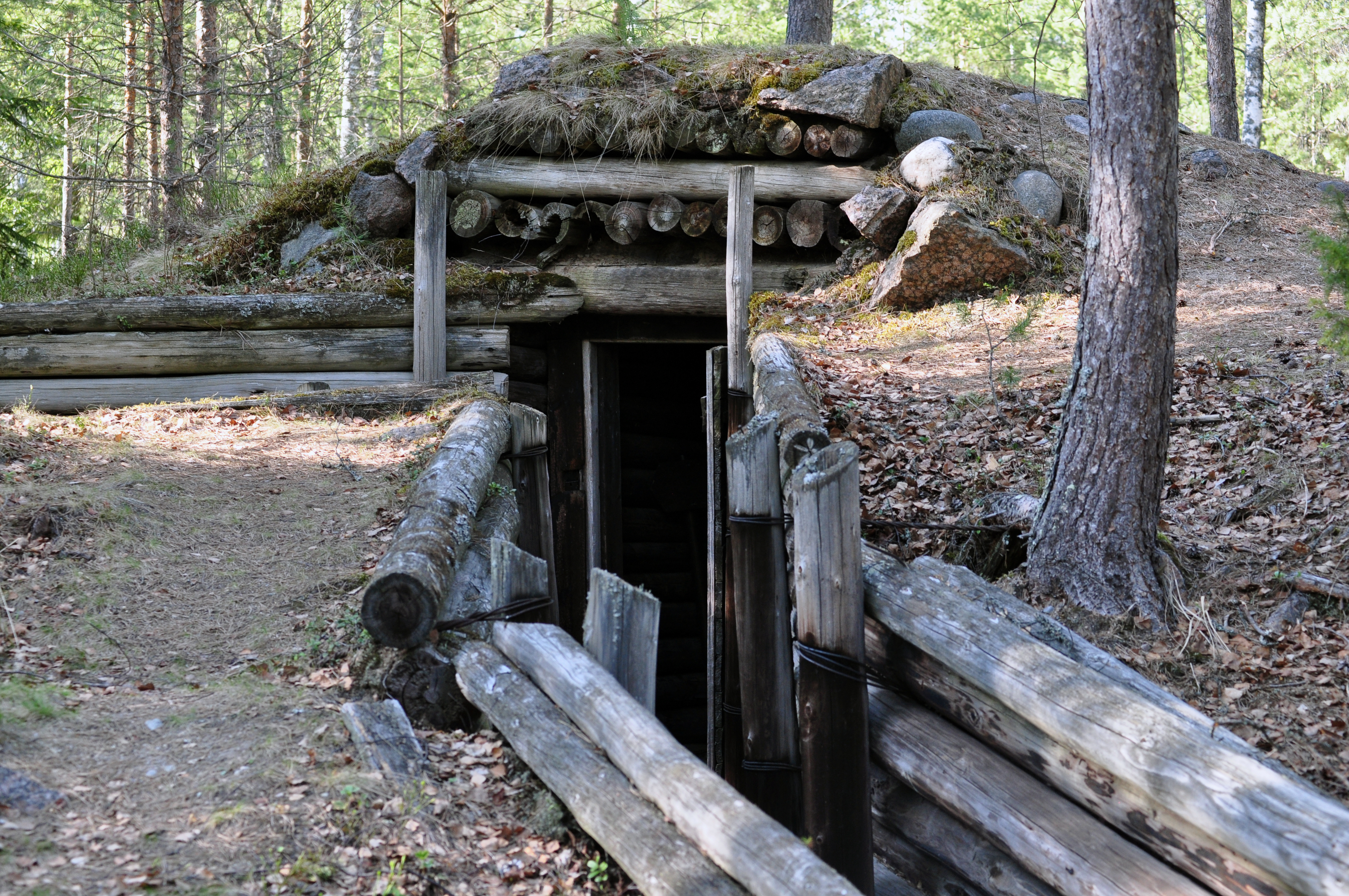
The Salpa Line served Finland fighting against the Soviet Union during the Continuation War. Photo taken in Luumäki, Finland, in 2011.

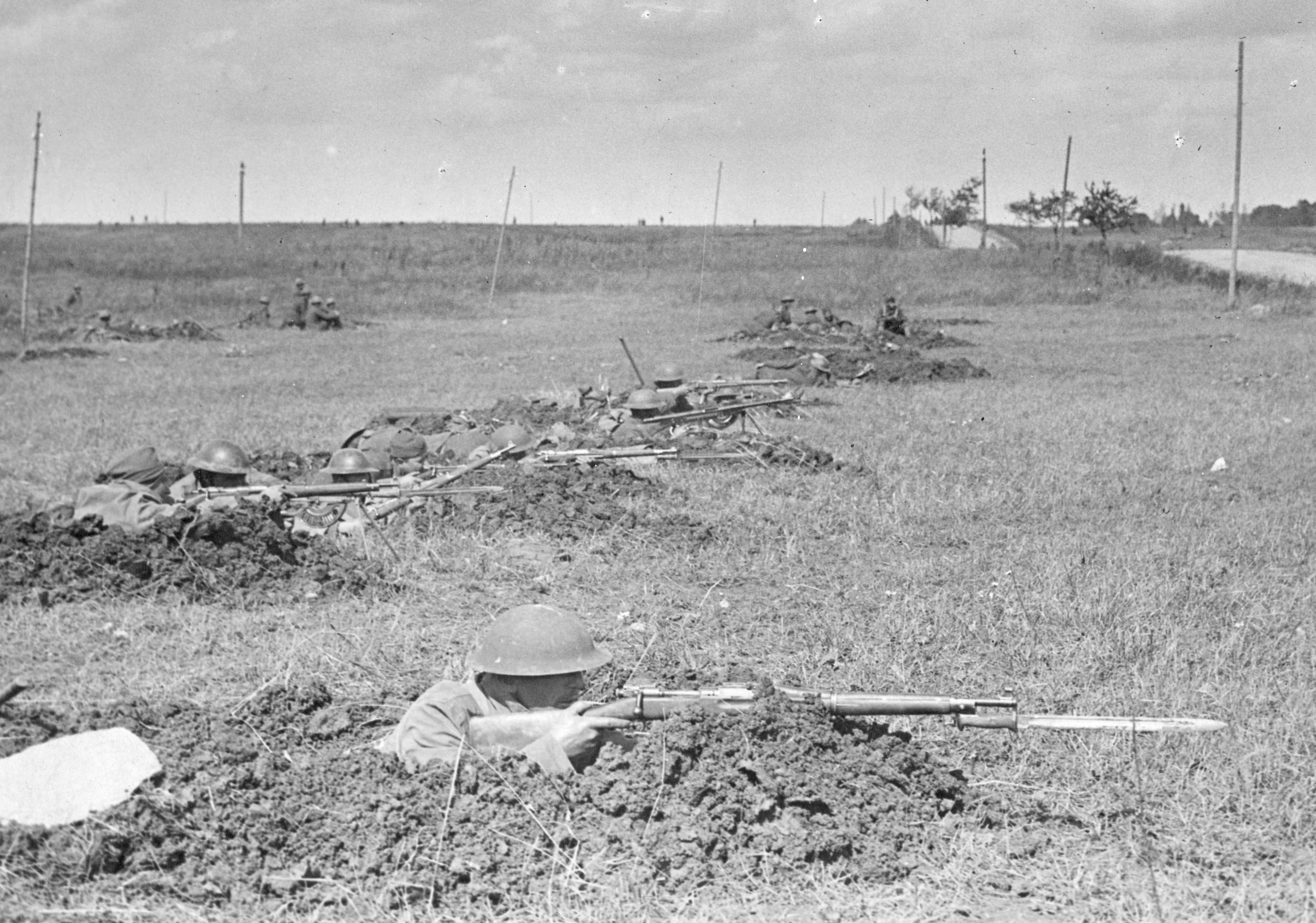
Soldiers of the 167th Infantry Regiment in fighting positions during the St. Mihiel offensive, September 1918.

Tobruk type positions are named after the system of defensive positions constructed, initially, by the Italian Army at Tobruk, Libya. After Tobruk fell to the Allies in January 1941, the existing positions were modified and significantly expanded by the Australian Army which, along with other Allied forces, reused them in the Siege of Tobruk.

A foxhole is one type of defensive strategic position. It is a "small pit used for cover, usually for one or two personnel, and so constructed that the occupants can effectively fire from it".

It is known more commonly within United States Army slang as a "fighting position" or as a "ranger grave". It is known as a "fighting hole" in the United States Marine Corps, a "gun-pit" in Australian Army terminology, and a "fighting pit" in the New Zealand Army.

In British and Canadian military argot it equates to a range of terms including slit trench, or fire trench (a trench deep enough for a soldier to stand in), a sangar (sandbagged fire position above ground) or shell scrape (a shallow depression that affords protection in the prone position), or simply—but less accurately—as a "trench".

During the American Civil War the term "rifle pit" was recognized by both U.S. Army and Confederate Army forces.

A protected emplacement or concealed post in which one or several machine guns are set up is known in U.S. English as a machine gun nest.

== History ==
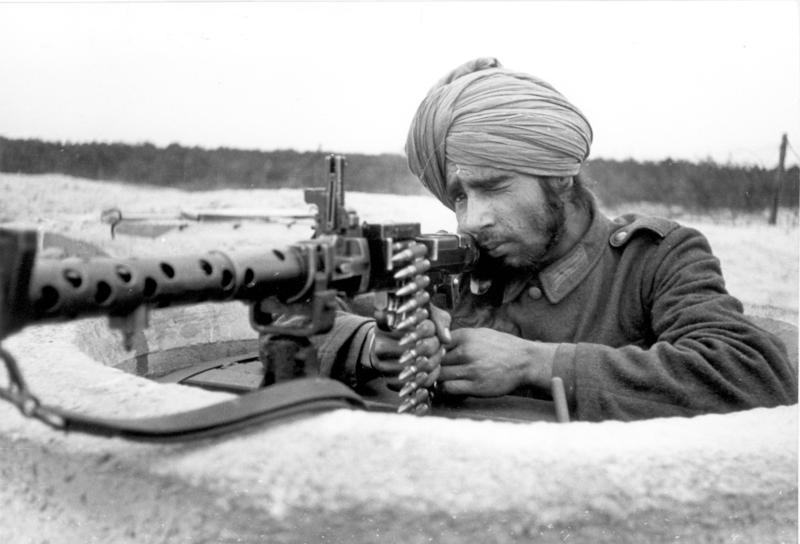
An Indian Wehrmacht volunteer in a Tobruk DFP along the Atlantic Wall, 1944

The Imperial Russian Army were the first to use what was later termed "rifle pits" during the Crimean War. These were small holes dug just in front of their trenches, large enough to fit anywhere from one to twenty soldiers. These soldiers were armed with rifles so as to harass Allied work parties advancing their own trench lines. Such pits were among the fortifications Major Richard Delafield observed and reported on as part of the Delafield Commission.

Rifle pits were used again during the American Civil War for the same purpose of providing a defensive position for one or more skirmishers or pickets. However, while military engineers recognized the difference, many soldiers at the time used the term interchangeably for other defensive earthworks. In general, it was the most commonly used word to describe any defensive fighting position meant for infantry.

During the fighting in North Africa (1942–43), U.S. forces employed the shell scrape. This was a very shallow excavation allowing one soldier to lie horizontally while shielding his body from nearby shell bursts and small arms fire. The shell scrape soon proved inadequate in this role, as the few inches of dirt above the soldier's body could often be penetrated by bullets or shell fragments. It also exposed the user to assault by enemy tanks, which could crush a soldier inside a shallow shell scrape by driving into it, then making a simple half-turn.

After the Battle of Kasserine Pass (early 1943), U.S. troops increasingly adopted the modern foxhole, a vertical, bottle-shaped hole that allowed a soldier to stand and fight with head and shoulders exposed. The foxhole widened near the bottom to allow a soldier to crouch down while under intense artillery fire or tank attack. Foxholes could be enlarged to two-soldier fighting positions, as well as excavated with firing steps for crew-served weapons or sumps for water drainage or live enemy grenade disposal.

=== Tobruks ===
The Germans used hardened fortifications in North Africa and later in other fortifications, such as the Atlantic Wall, that were in essence foxholes made from concrete. The Germans knew them officially as Ringstände; the Allies called them "Tobruks" because they had first encountered the structures during the fighting in Africa.

Frequently, the Germans put a turret from an obsolete French or German tank on the foxhole. This gave the Tobruk enhanced firepower and the gunner protection from shrapnel and small arms.

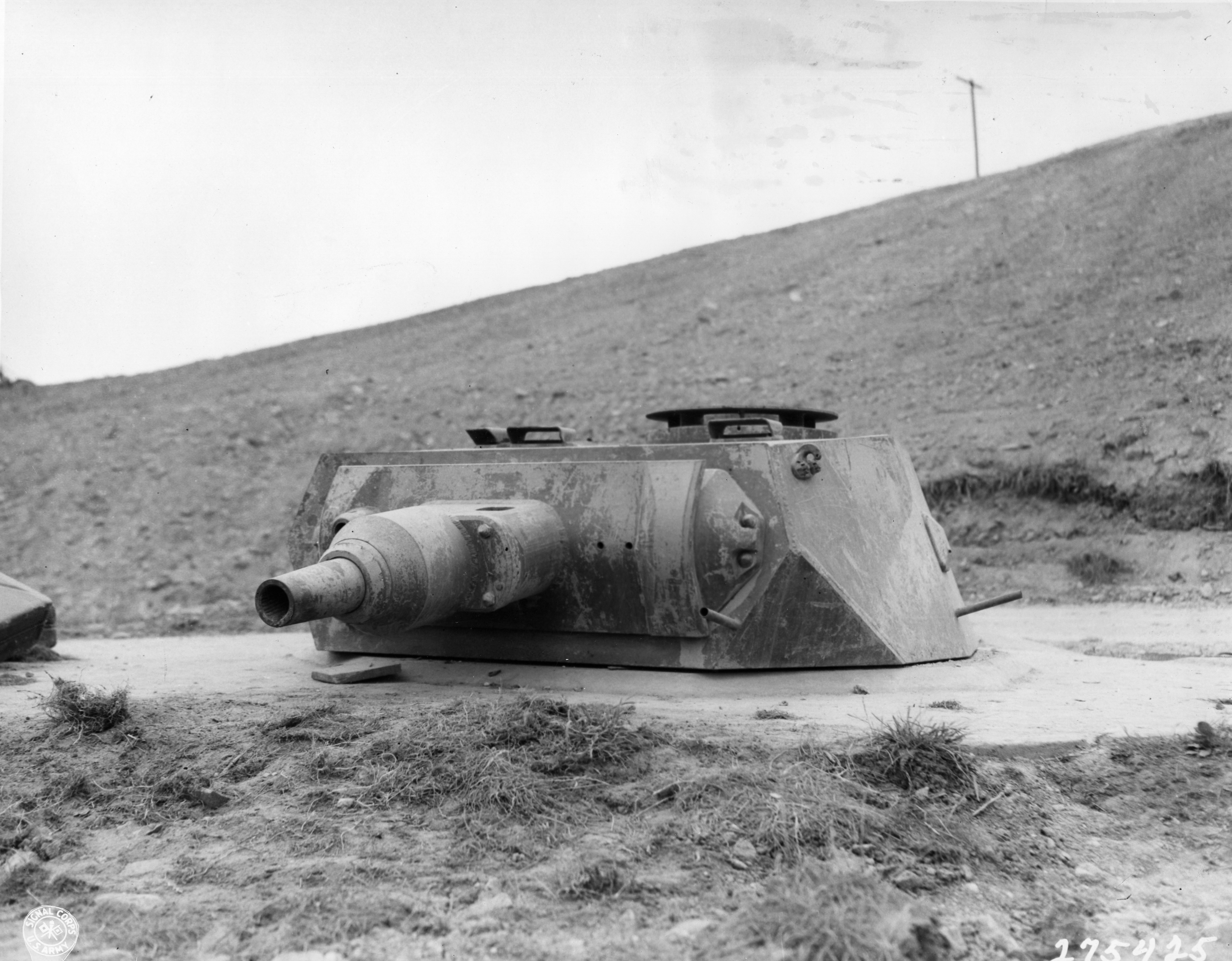
German VK 3001H prototype turret mounted on "Tobruk" at Omaha Beach, June 1944

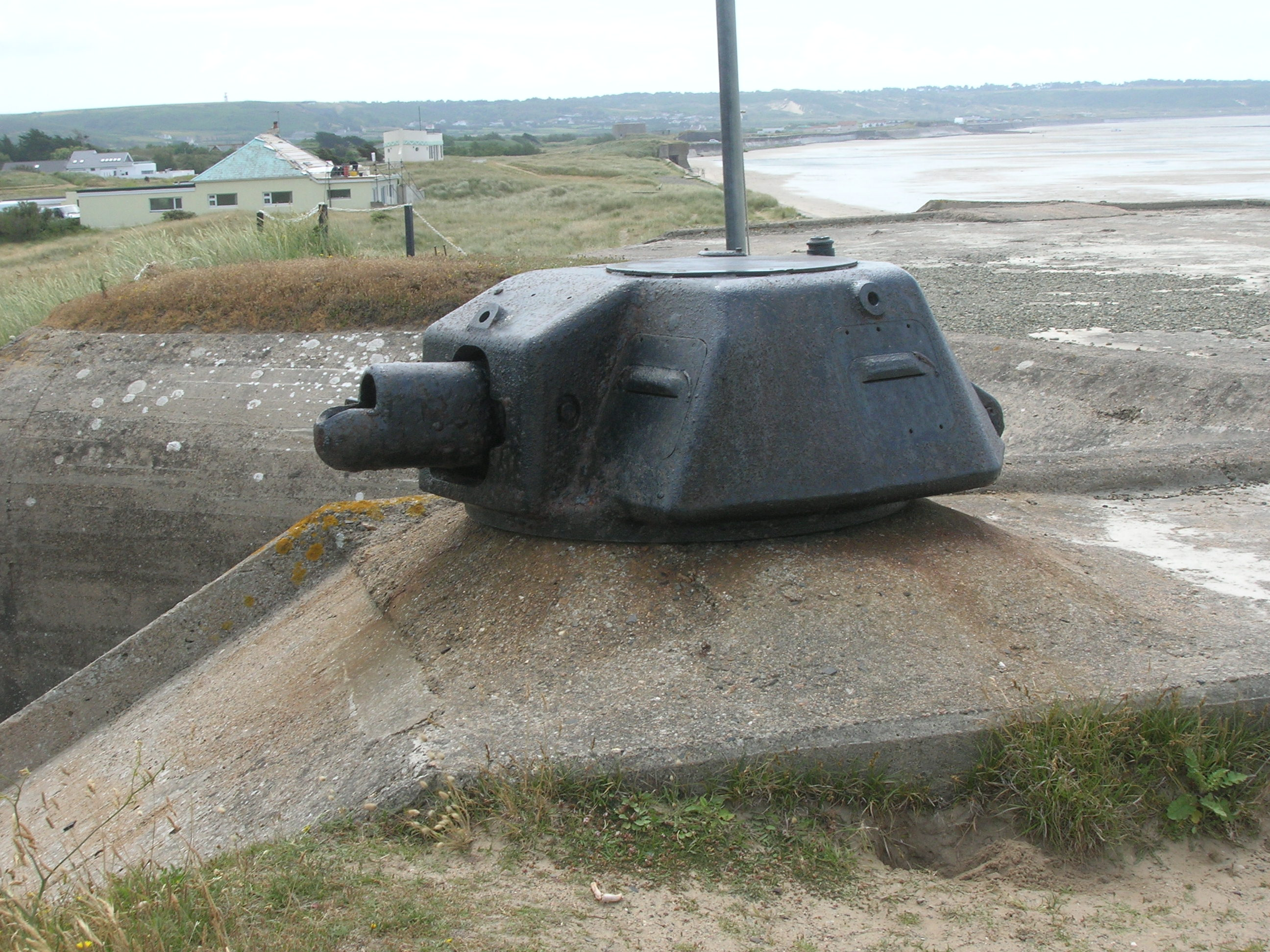
Tobruk protecting the entrance to the bunker that now houses the Channel Islands Military Museum. This turret from a Renault R35 was originally employed on a Tobruk at Saint Aubin's Fort, Jersey.

== Modern designs ==
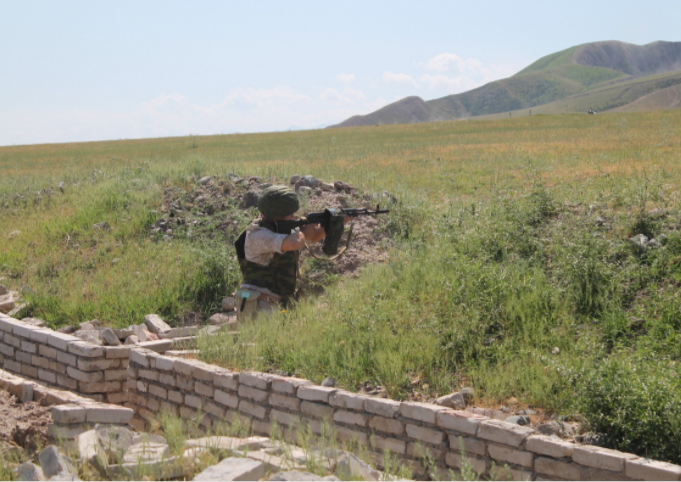
A trench reinforced with brickwork at a military training ground

Modern militaries publish and distribute elaborate field manuals for the proper construction of DFPs in stages. Initially, a shallow "shell scrape" is dug, often called a ranger grave, which provides very limited protection. Each stage develops the fighting position, gradually increasing its effectiveness, while always maintaining functionality. In this way, a soldier can improve the position over time, while being able to stop at any time and use the position in a fight.

Typically, a DFP is a pit or trench dug deep enough to stand in, with only the head exposed, and a small step at the bottom, called a fire step, that allows the soldier to crouch on to avoid fire and tank treads. The fire step usually slopes down into a deeper narrow slit called a grenade sump at the bottom to allow for live grenades to be kicked in to minimize damage from grenade fragments.

When possible, DFPs are revetted with corrugated iron, star pickets and wire or local substitutes. Ideally, the revetting will also be dug in below ground level so as to minimise damage from fire and tank tracks. The revetting helps the DFP resist cave-in from near misses from artillery or mortars and tank tracks.

Time permitting, DFPs can be enlarged to allow a machine gun crew and ammunition to be protected, as well as additional overhead cover via timbers.

In training, DFPs are usually dug by hand or in some cases by mechanical trench diggers. On operations, explosives, especially shaped charges ("beehives"), may be used to increase the speed of development.

Developing and maintaining DFPs is a constant and ongoing task for soldiers deployed in combat areas. For this reason, in some armies, infantry soldiers are referred to as "gravel technicians", as they spend so much time digging.

Because of the large expenditure in effort and materials required to build a DFP, it is important to ensure that the DFP is correctly sited. In order to site the DFP, the officer in charge ("OIC") should view the ground from the same level that the intended user's weapons will be sighted from. Normally, the OIC will need to lie on his belly to obtain the required perspective. This ensures that the position will be able to cover the desired sector.

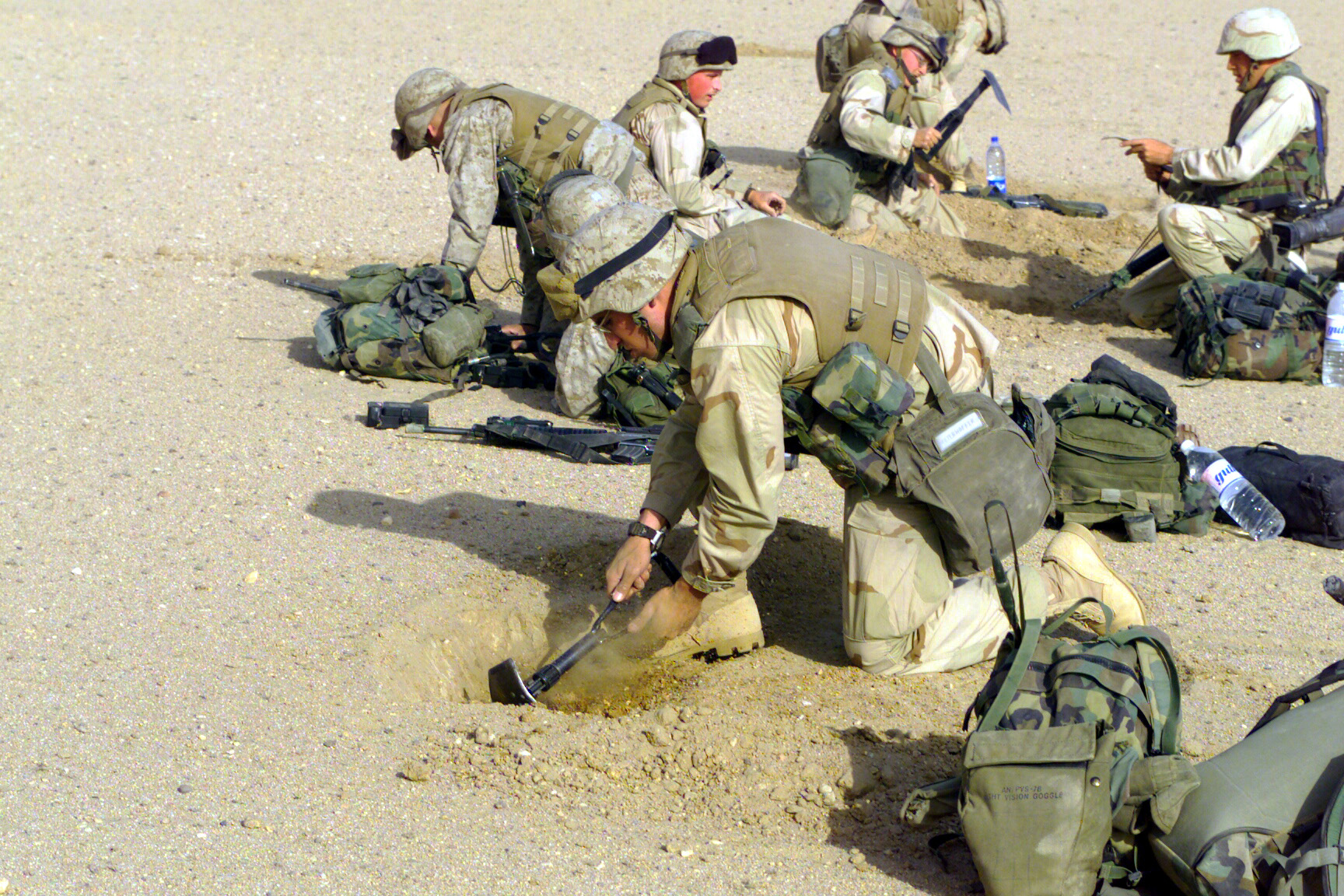
US Marines digging "fighting holes" near the Iraqi border, 2003.

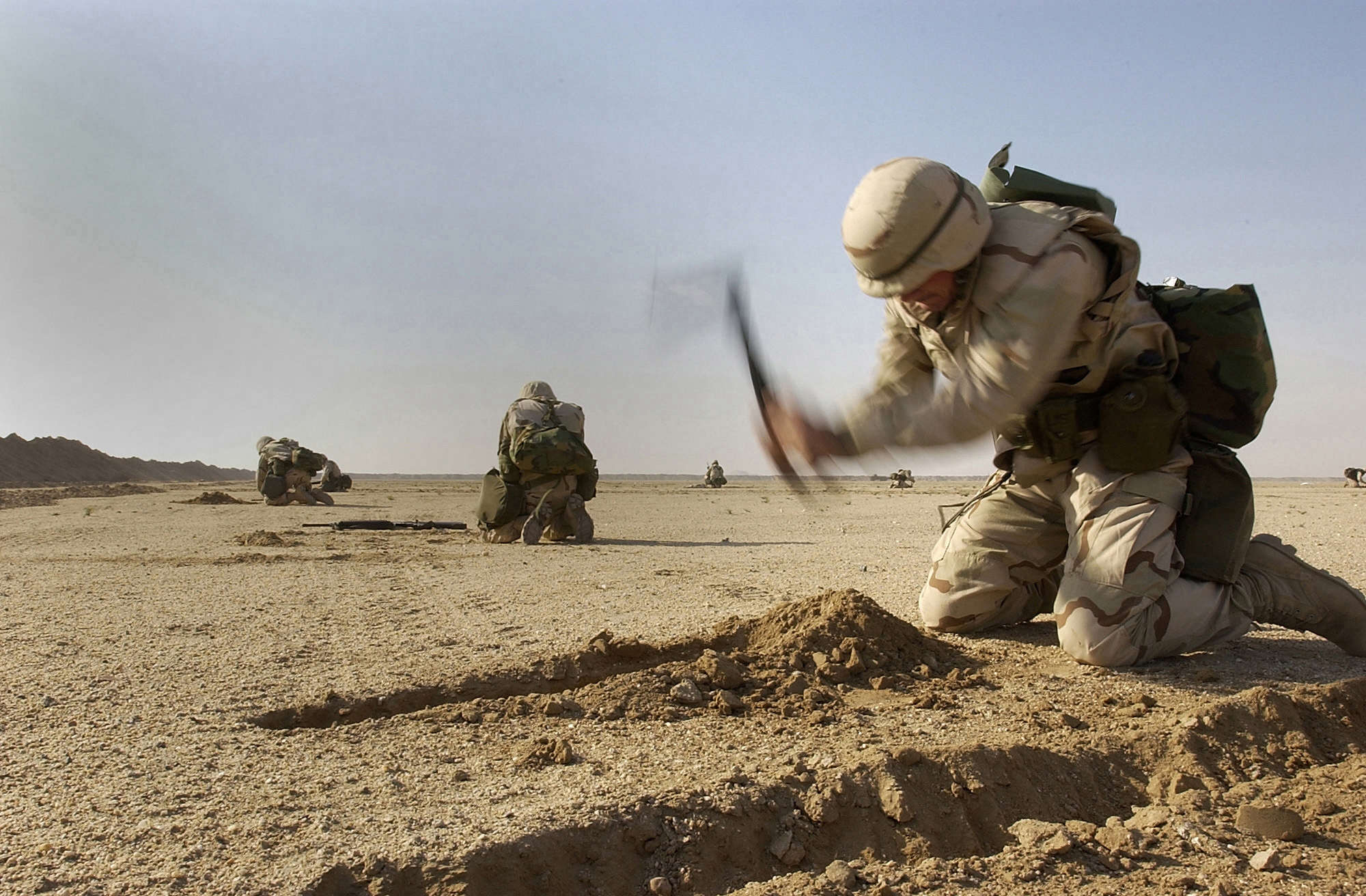
US Navy Seabees digging "hasty scrapes", 2003.

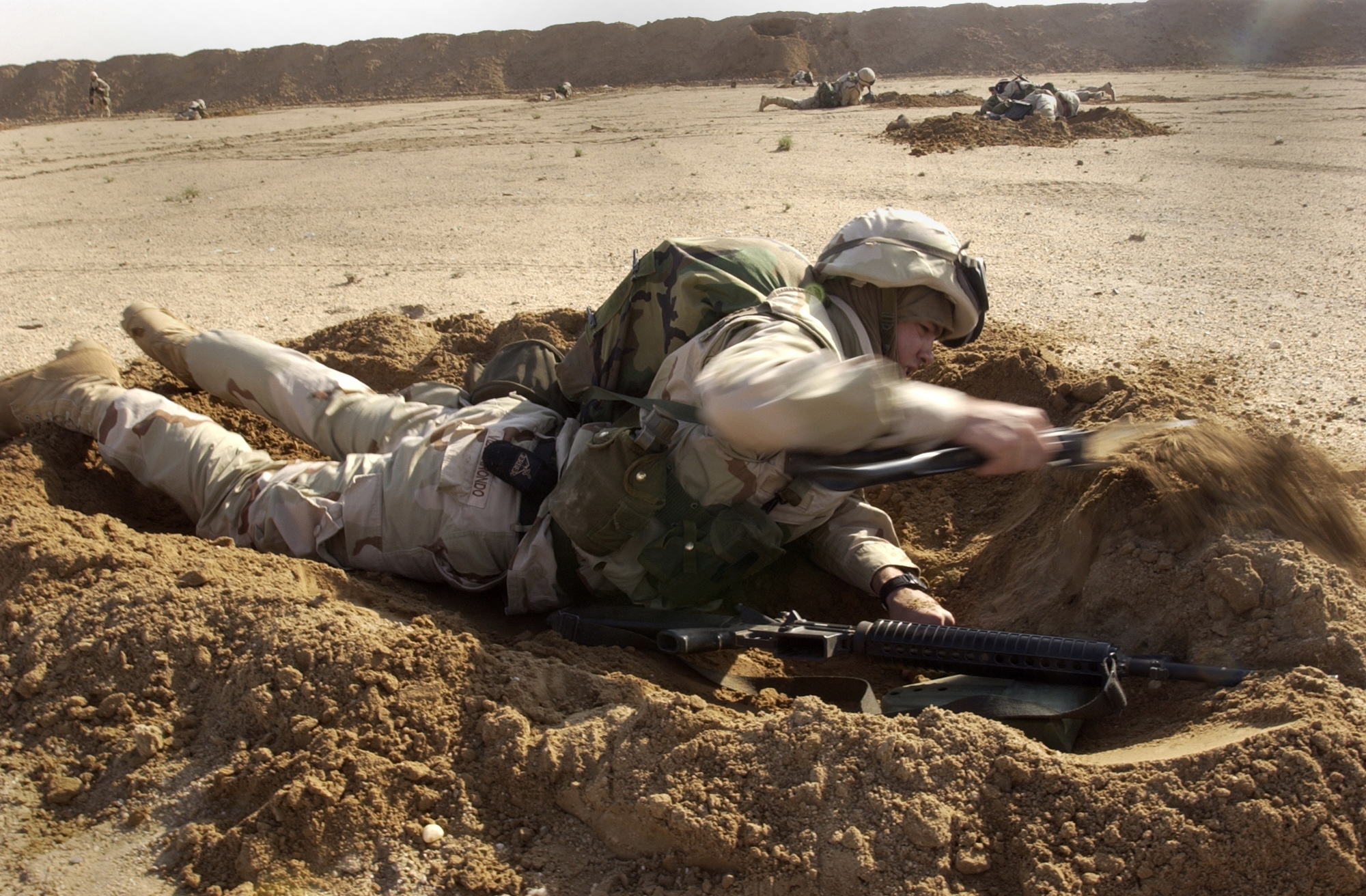
US Navy Seabees near completed fighting position, 2003.

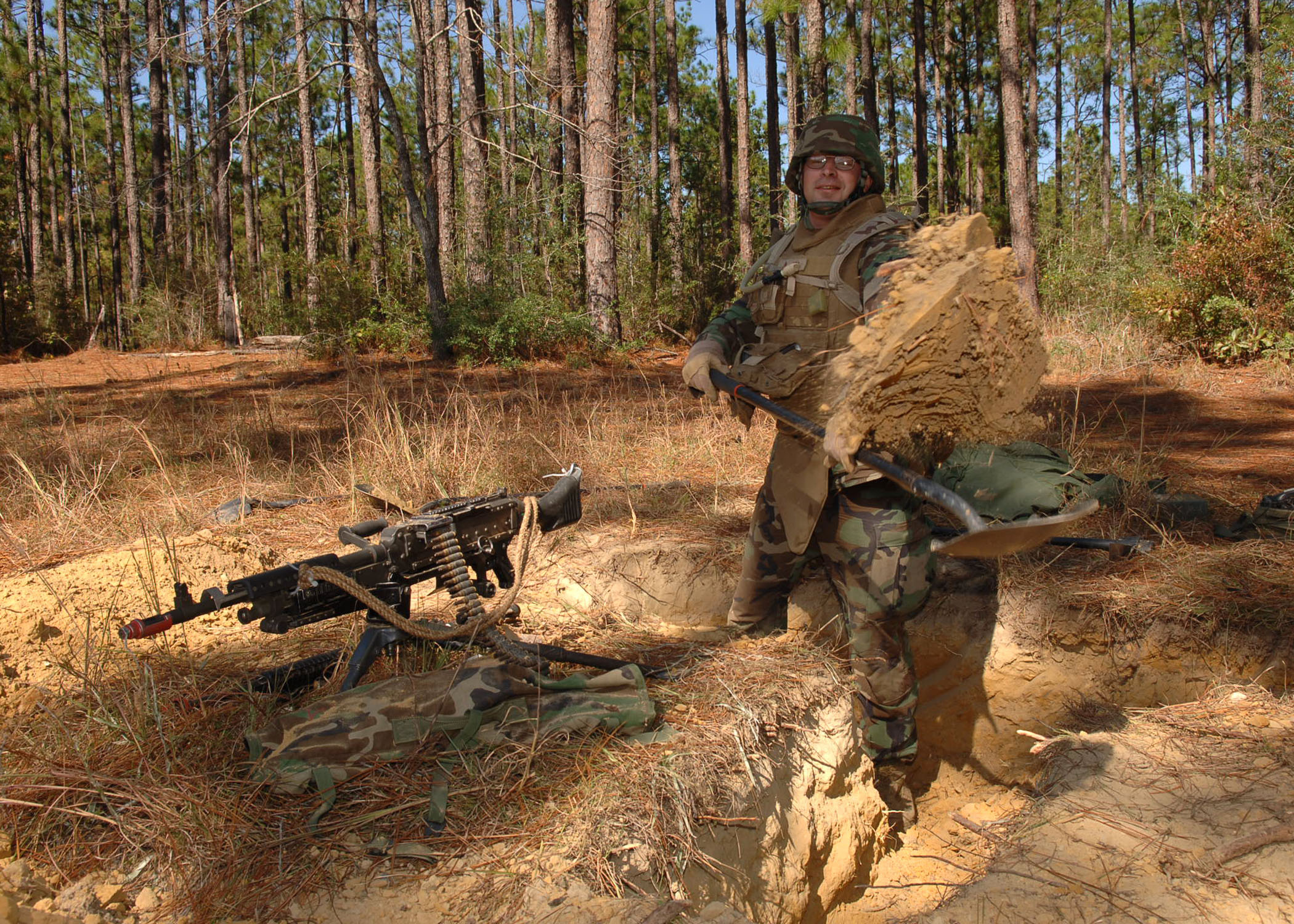
US Navy Seabees constructing a defensive machine gun position during training, 2010.

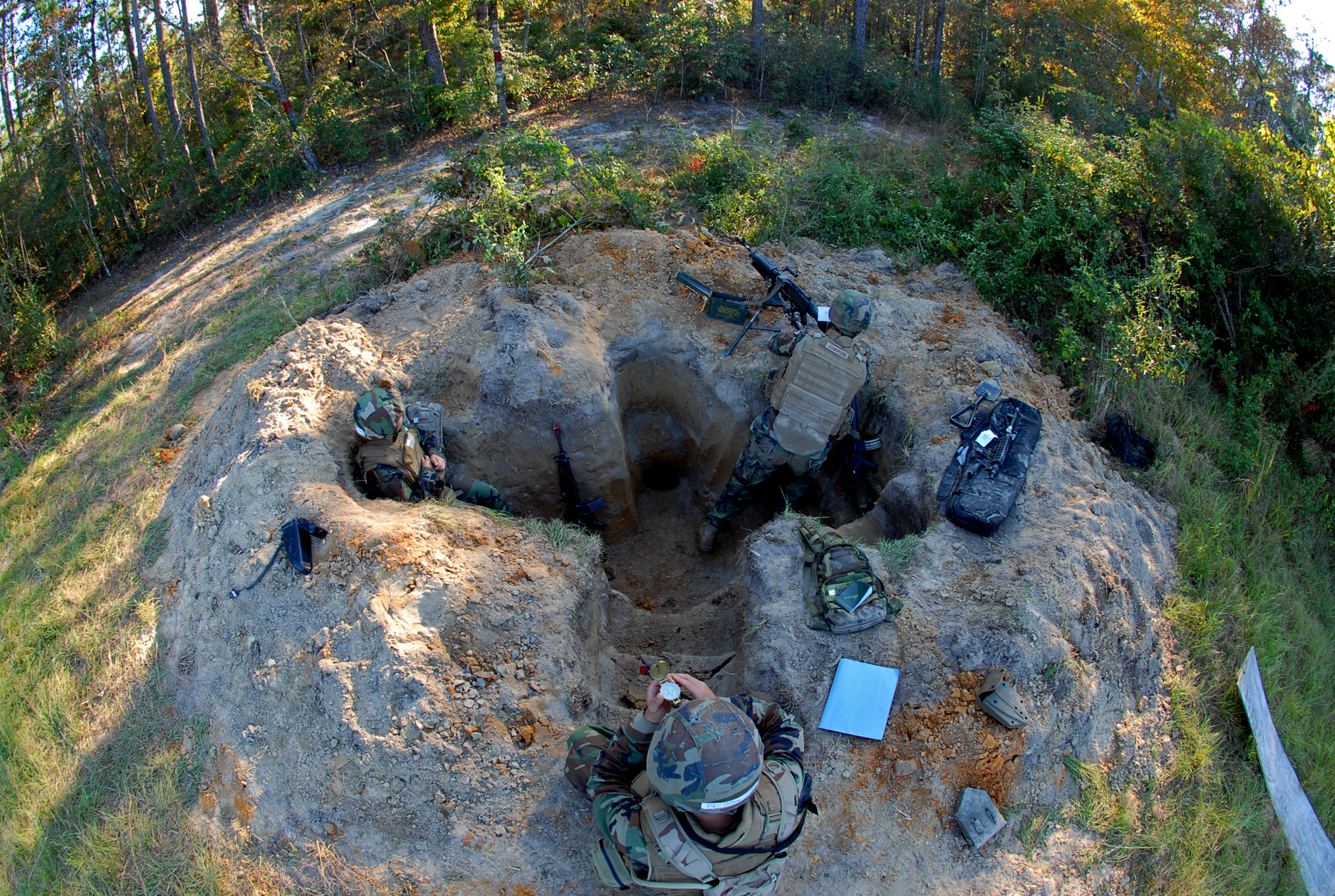
US Navy Seabees with a completed defensive machine gun position during training, 2008.

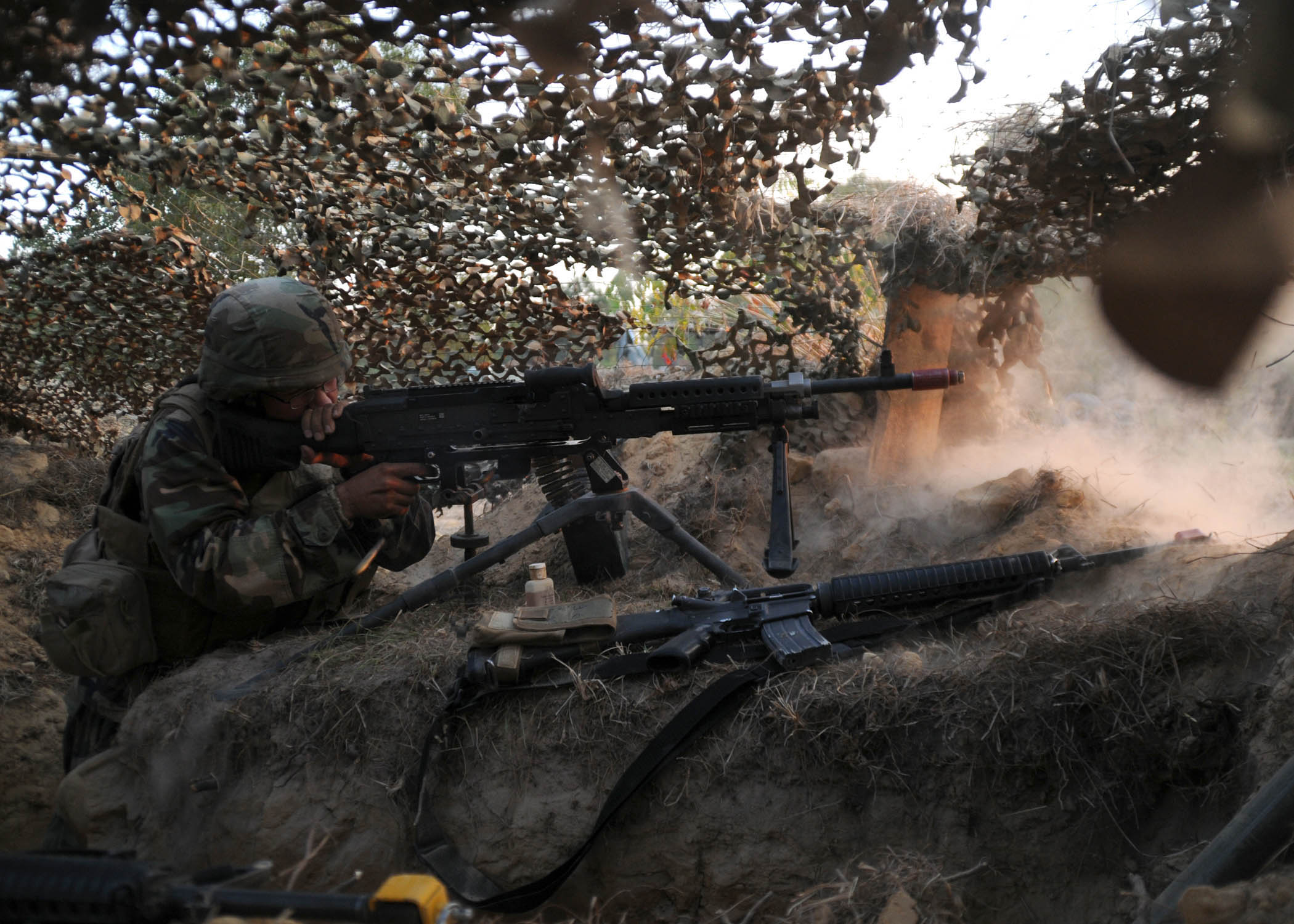
US Navy Seabees completed defensive machine gun position during training with camouflage netting and timber supports, 2010.

== See also ==
- Pillbox (military)
- Sangar
- Spider hole
- Shell scrape
- Tett turret
- Trench warfare
- All-around defense/Perimeter defense
- Entrenching tool
