= Dart (missile) =

Hurled weapon with a sharp point

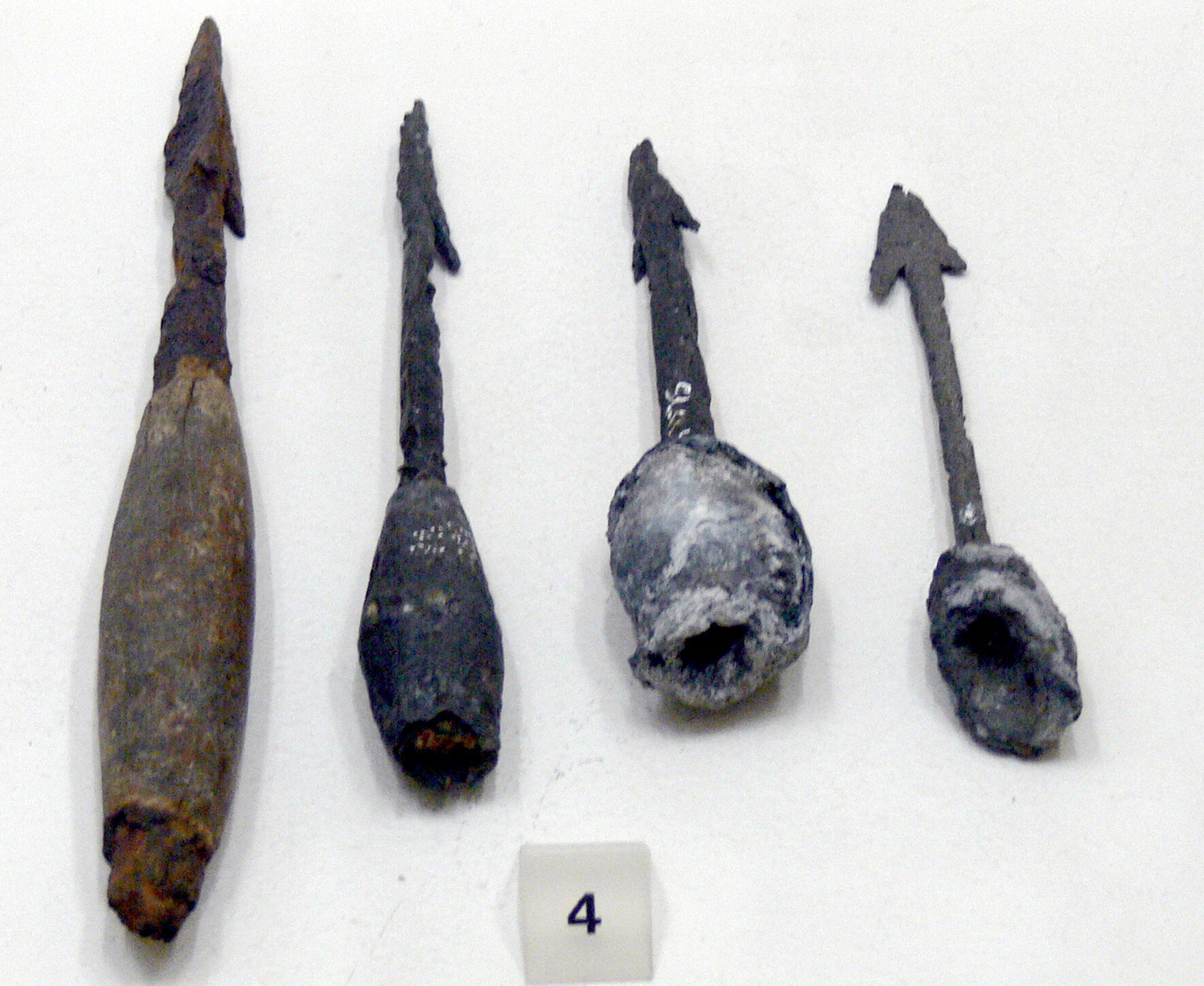
Roman plumbatae. The wooden shafts and fletching have decayed.

Darts are airborne ranged weapons. They are designed to fly such that a sharp, often weighted point will strike first. They can be distinguished from javelins by the presence of fletching (feathers on the tail) and a shaft that is shorter or more flexible. Darts can be propelled by hand or with the aid of a hand-held implement such as a blowgun. They can be distinguished from arrows because they are not used with a bow.

Darts have been used since pre-history. The plumbatae were lead-weighted darts thrown by infantrymen in Antiquity and the Middle Ages. Darts can be propelled by a number of means. The atlatl uses leverage to increase the velocity of the dart, the kestros increases the range of propelled darts using a sling, and the exhalation of a person's breath through a blowgun propels small stone points or poisoned needles with pneumatic force.

In the modern era, darts have been used for recreation in lawn darts and the game of darts.

== History ==
=== Pre-history ===
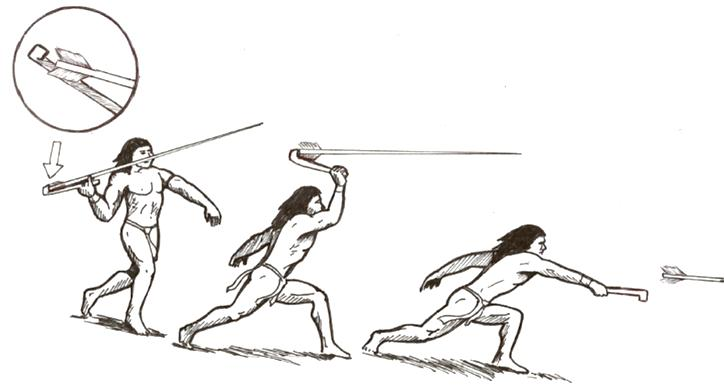
A dart being propelled by an atlatl

Some of the earliest evidence of advanced tool use includes remnants of an early type of dart, which can be considered the ancestor of arrows as well as bows. Reconstructions of this system have a range of over one hundred metres (yards) and can penetrate several centimetres of oak. This technology was used worldwide from the Upper Palaeolithic (late Solutrean, c. 18,000–16,000 BC) until the development of archery made it obsolete.

The darts in question are much larger than arrows, but noticeably lighter than javelins. They have a weighted point, often of stone, on a removable foreshaft. This is held by friction onto a thin, flexible main shaft a few metres in length, with fletching and a (usually socket-like) nock at the opposite end. Since they are unlike anything in Western history, the term "dart" has been adopted after some debate. Some alternate terms for this missile have included the spear, but this term has fallen out of favour since in all other uses, spears are stiff enough to be used for stabbing. In its function, an atlatl dart is more like a combination between a bow and an arrow.

Its similarity to a bow may not be immediately obvious, but in fact both serve to accumulate energy by elasticity in a similar way. As throwing begins, a dart of this type is designed to flex in compression between the accelerating force at its nock and the inertia of its weighted point, storing energy. Late in this throw, as the point moves faster and so offers less resistance, the dart releases most of this energy by springing away from the thrower. Some energy may also be recovered by the fletching as the projectile "fishtails" through the air. However, this energy is far less than is commonly stated and only effectively increases accuracy by counteracting the downward force on the tail.

To maximize elastic energy storage and recovery, such darts should be held only by the nock and allowed to pivot as they are thrown. This requires a special tool called a spear-thrower. In Western culture these might be called atlatl borrowed from the Aztec, or in Australia the Eora/Dharug word woomera is used.

=== Plumbatae or martiobarbuli ===
Plumbatae or martiobarbuli were lead-weighted darts carried by infantrymen in Antiquity and the Middle Ages. The first examples seem to have been carried by the Ancient Greeks from about 500 BC onwards, but the best-known users were from the Roman and Byzantine armies. The best written source for these tactical weapons is Vegetius's treatise known as De Re Militari (1.17).

=== Replacement by the arrow ===
In Europe, the spear-thrower was supplemented by the bow and arrow in the Epipaleolithic period. By the Iron Age, the amentum, a strap attached to the shaft, was the standard European mechanism for throwing lighter javelins. The amentum gives not only range, but also spin to the projectile.

Archery may be easier to learn and have a faster rate of fire, yet perhaps this system's greatest advantage over the spear-thrower is that ammunition is easier to make and transport. Since the dart must store almost all of the system's elastic energy, more care, planning, and weight of elastic material must be invested in its construction. In archery, the bulk of elastic energy is stored in the throwing device, rather than the projectile; arrow shafts can therefore be much smaller, and have looser tolerances for spring constant and weight distribution than spear-thrower darts. For example, stone dart points from the same set tend to vary in mass by no more than a few percent, and computer simulations show that this is necessary for efficient operation. Similar constraints exist for the length, diameter, and materials quality of the shaft. If the same amount of attention and material are instead invested into a bow, projectiles can be made lighter (by a factor of five or more) and to less exacting tolerances. This allowed for more forgiving flint knapping.

Greater mass becomes an advantage over archery when penetration is an overwhelming concern, as when harpooning sea mammals. This class of dart was used by aboriginal Arctic hunters such as the Aleut until fairly recently.

=== Reconstructions ===
Darts, plumbata and atlatls have been constructed by modern enthusiasts, either with ancient materials and methods or with high technology borrowed from modern archery. While some do this in the context of anthropology or mechanical engineering, many view the practice as a sport, and throw competitively for distance and/or for accuracy. Throws of almost 260 m (850 ft) have been recorded.

== Types of traditional darts ==
The darts in use by the developers of the English language were used throughout Europe for much of its military history, though they were never a dominant weapons technology. They have also lent their name to quite a few weapons from other cultures.

=== Thrown darts ===
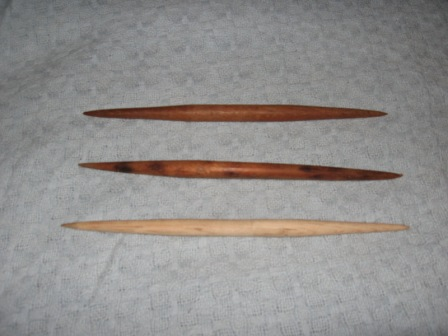
Bagakay throwing darts from the Philippines

It is quite reasonable to speculate the darts used with atlatls were adapted from hand-thrown darts, which in turn were derived from light javelins. In Europe, short but heavy-pointed darts were sometimes used in warfare. These had a length of about 30 and 60 cm (12 and 24 in) and resembled an arrow with a long head and short shaft. Examples of thrown darts include:

- The plumbata, a Roman dart weighted with lead. In some legions, five of these were carried inside each soldier's shield; reconstructions show a range of 70 m (230 ft) or more when thrown overhand in the fashion of a German stick grenade.
- Some types of the Japanese shuriken
- The bagakay from the Philippines, made from bamboo (weighted with clay) or wood sharpened at both ends and around six to ten inches long. They were usually thrown five at a time and were effective at short ranges in puncturing thick objects. They were used for hunting birds and as a projectile weapon in warfare.

=== Feathered darts ===
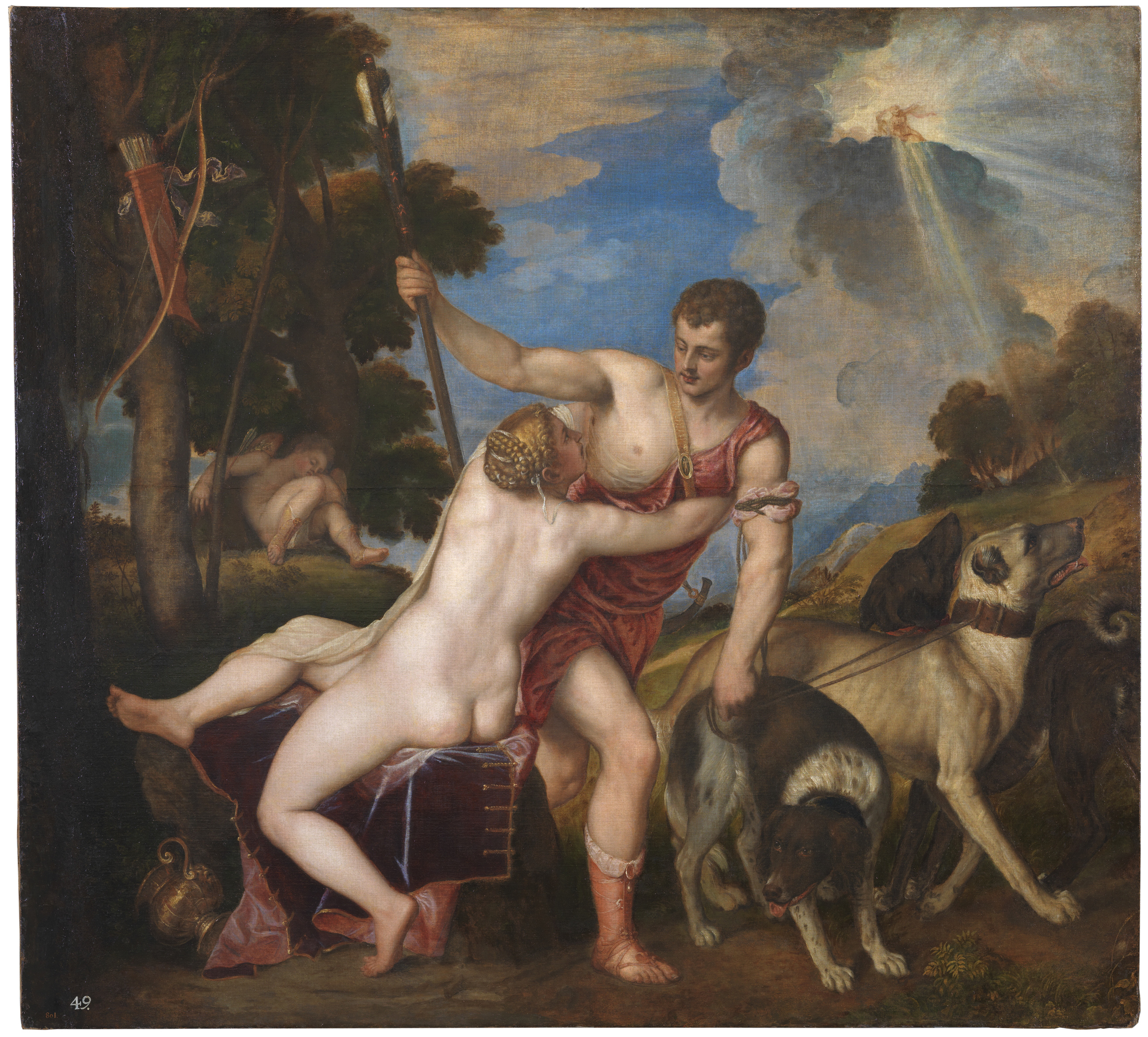
Detail of a feathered dart from Venus and Adonis by Titian, Prado, 1554

Feathered spears, often called darts or javelins, were used in medieval and Renaissance Europe, both as ceremonial objects and as weapons. It is possible no examples have survived, presumably due to their fragility or the deterioration of their fletching making them indistinguishable from spears, but they appear in multiple illustrations from the 15th and 16th century. As ceremonial items, they are shown held similar to scepters by military commanders and leaders such as Emperor Maximilian I. Many other illustrations show large darts being wielded as weapons, either on the battlefield or in smaller engagements such as judicial battles. Depictions show them as being four to seven feet long, with arrow-like feather fletching, barbed points and thick shafts comparable to conventional polearms, presumably able to serve for both throwing and hand-held striking. One such example has historically been depicted on French and English pattern playing cards, where the jack of clubs is armed with one.

Some later artistic depictions suggest they may have also been used for hunting.

=== Kestros ===
The kestrosphendone, or kestros, was a sling-launched dart, invented in 168 BC for the Third Macedonian War, probably similar to hand-thrown darts of the period. Casting one (according to surviving records) requires a specially designed sling with two unequal loops, though it is not clear whether this is a stave-sling or more closely resembles a shepherd's sling.

=== Blow darts ===
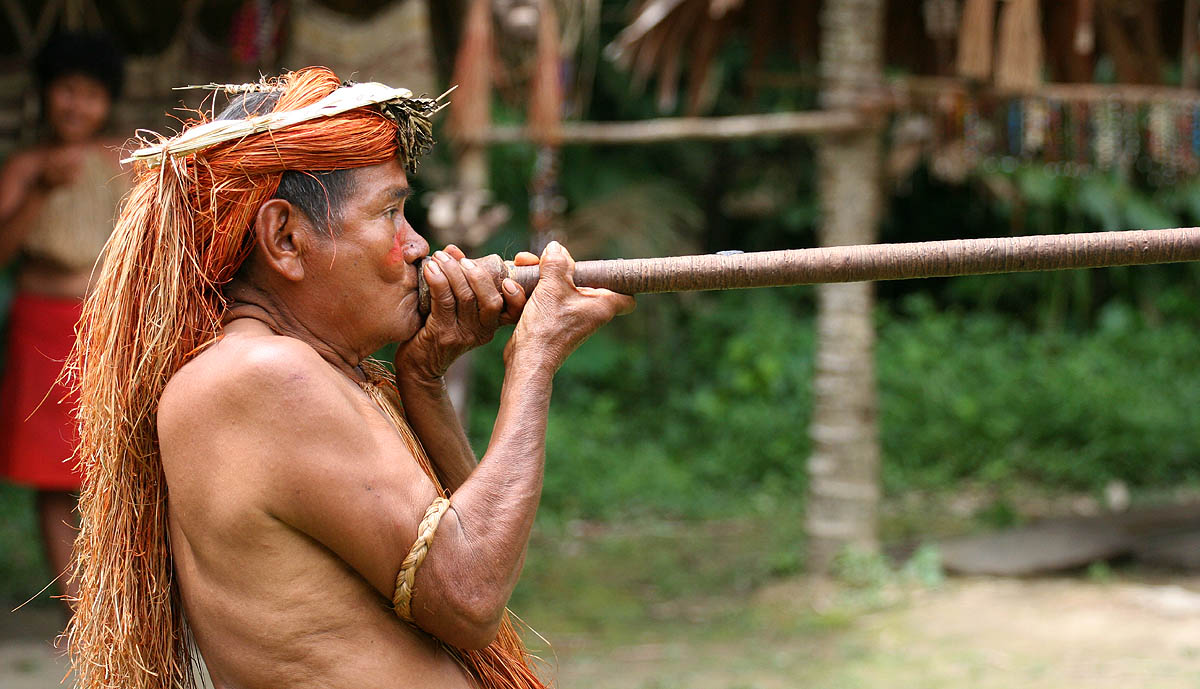
Demonstration of a blowgun by a traditional hunter

The blowgun can be used to fire darts. Often, these are quite small, and do little harm by themselves; instead, they are effective due to poison spread onto their points, from (for example) dart frogs or curare.

=== Rope dart ===
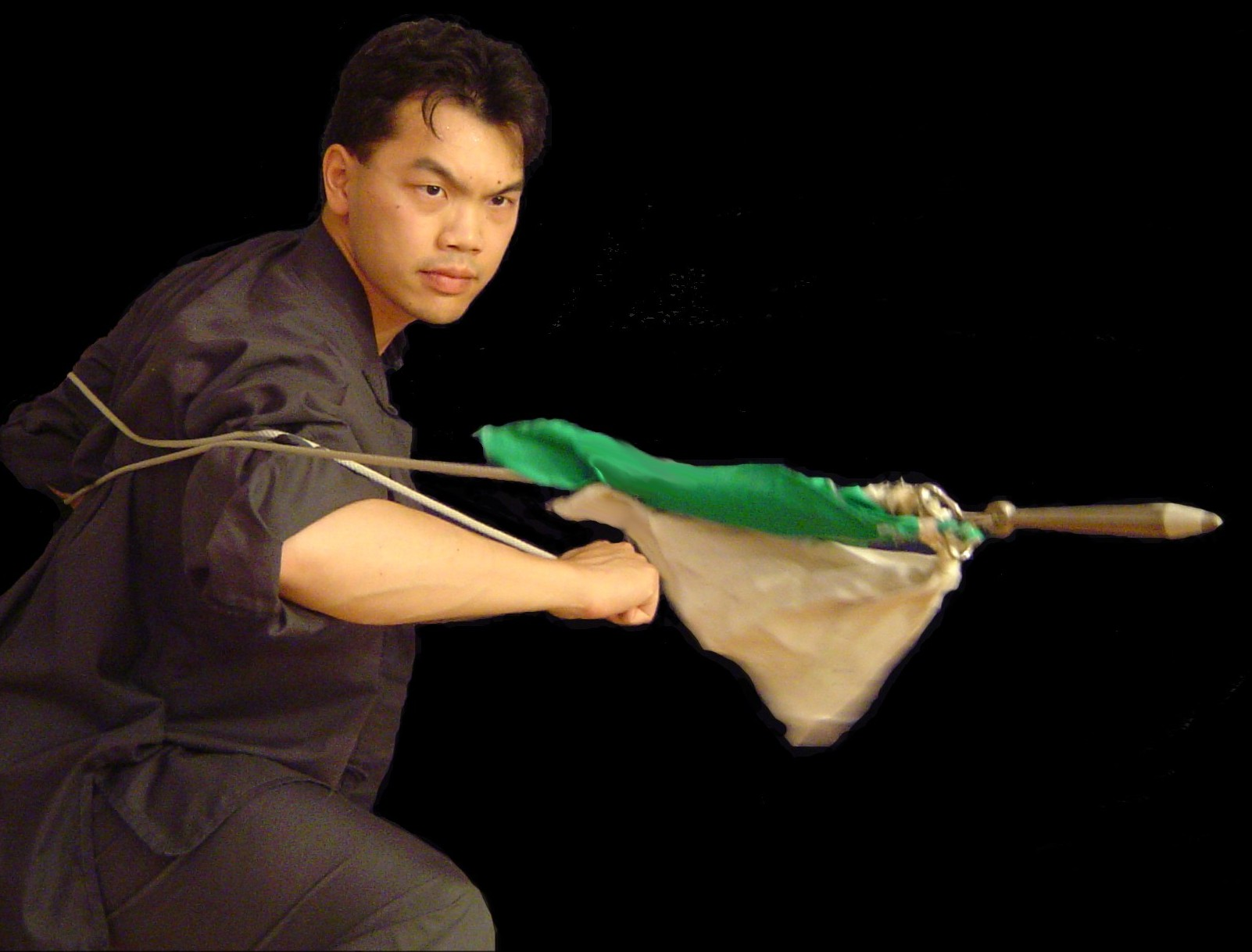
Demonstration of the use of a rope dart

This is a pointed weight attached at its blunt end to a length of rope or chain, which can be used to throw and retrieve it. It meets the definition above because it flies freely when no tension is applied to the rope, has a point and – in the form of a square of cloth – even has fletching. Shengbiao is a discipline of Wushu devoted to its use.

=== Swiss arrow ===
A Swiss arrow (also known as a Yorkshire arrow) is a dart thrown using a cord to make the dart go farther with the same power.

== Modern darts ==
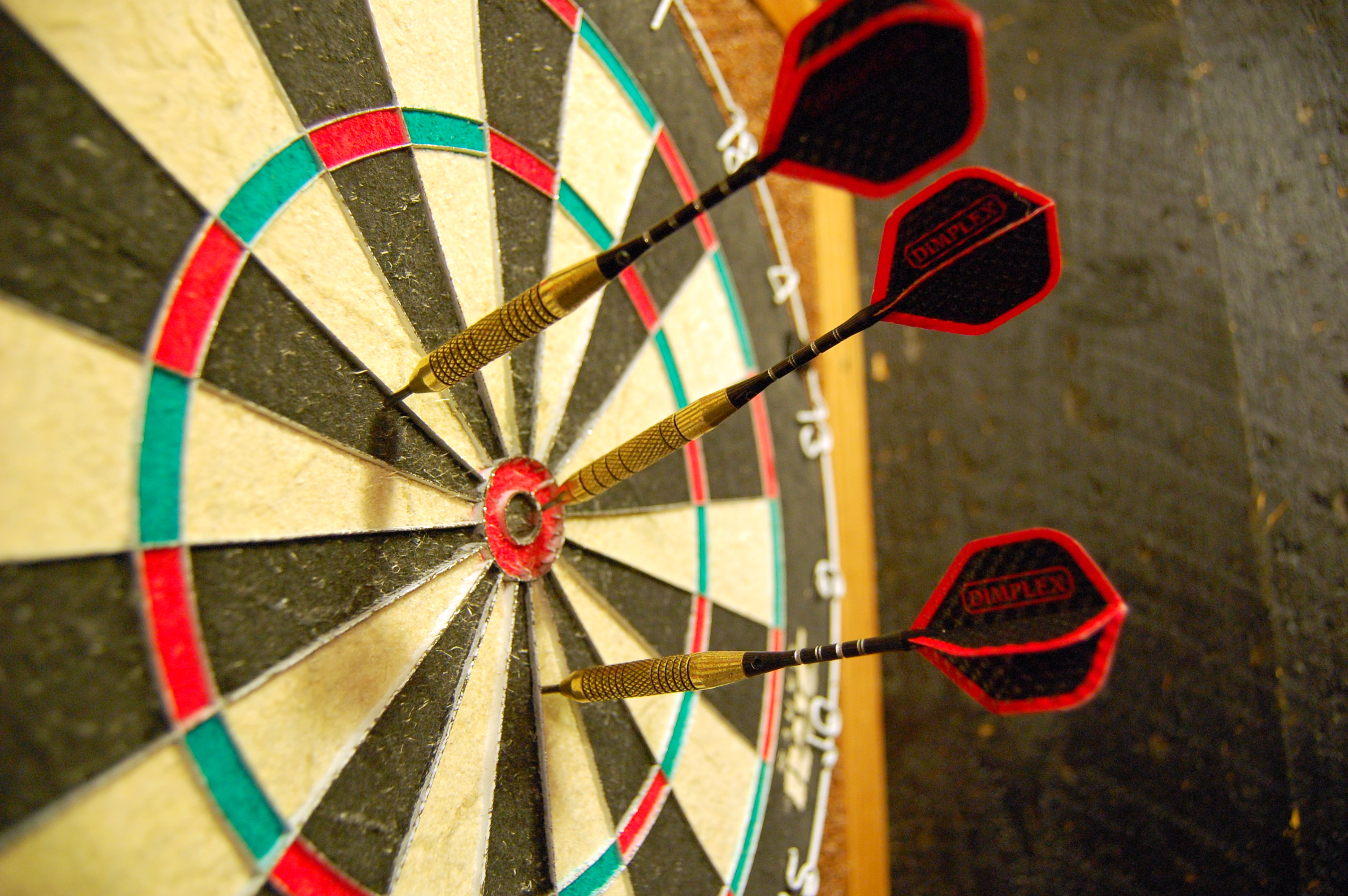
Darts on a dartboard

Of the darts still in widespread use, perhaps the closest to traditional thrown darts are lawn darts. These are large and heavy enough to be thrown by swinging, and to seriously wound a person when thrown.

Khuru is a traditional Bhutanese dart sport. In this game, the players have a target to aim at and two darts to throw. The Bhutan Indigenous Games and Sports Association specifies that the distance between two targets is 35 meters for men and 27 meters for women.

An indoor game of darts has also been developed. For competitive purposes, a dart cannot weigh more than 50 g (1.8 oz) including the shaft and flight and cannot exceed a total length of 30 cm (12 in). They are designed to penetrate dart boards.

A child-safe dart game utilizes magnetic darts with blunt tips, designed to stick securely to a specialized magnetic dartboard.

Tranquilizer darts are related to the darts for blowguns, but include a hypodermic needle and a hollow reservoir resembling a syringe, which is generally filled with sedatives or other drugs. These are launched from a dart gun using compressed gas, a tuft of fibers at the back of the missile serving as both fletching and wadding.

A type of dart still finds use in military engagements, in the form of flechettes. These are all-metal projectiles, often resembling nails that have had fletching (rather than nail heads) forged into them. They were used by American forces during the wars in Korea and Vietnam, but treaties have since been enacted to limit their use.

Large flechettes are used as kinetic energy penetrators in many gun-fired anti-armour projectiles.

== See also ==
- Crossbow bolt
- Scorpio (weapon), small catapult discharging iron darts
