= Spearthrower =

Spearthrower may refer to:

- Spear-thrower or atlatl, a tool that uses leverage to achieve greater velocity in dart-throwing, and includes a bearing surface which allows the user to store energy during the throw
- Woomera (spear-thrower), a wooden Australian Aboriginal spear-throwing device similar to an atlatl
