= Swiss arrow =

Large hand-thrown dart with fletching

A Swiss arrow (also known as a Yorkshire arrow, Dutch arrow, Scotch arrow, or Gypsy arrow) is a type of enlarged dart in the shape of an arrow that is thrown with the aid of a lanyard, which is retained by a small notch close to the fletching. It is very similar to an amentum and uses the same throwing principle as a spear-thrower.

== Design ==
The arrow shaft is made from wood. A slit is cut at one end to take a pair of card flights, and the other end is given a point. A notch or shallow groove is cut into or around the shaft, just below the flights. After the flights are inserted, the open end of the slit is closed with string or a rubber band to prevent the flights from falling out.

== Usage ==
To launch the arrow, the thrower uses a length of string that is longer than the length of the arrow itself. A knot is tied in one end of the string, and this is placed into the notch or groove in the arrow shaft. The rest of the string is then passed around the shaft once, and is made to align over and above the knot before being stretched down to the point end of the arrow. The string is tightened, ensuring that the knotted end stays within the notch, and the surplus is wound around the thrower's throwing hand. The throwing hand with the string wound around it should be near the point end of the arrow, with the thrower able to easily grip the end.

The arrow is then held behind the thrower, with the string taut. The throwing arm should be as fully extended as possible, enabling the arrow to be thrown like a javelin, but held much closer to the tip. Following through with the throwing hand allows the string to provide additional forward force on the arrow, extending the length and reach of the thrower's arm, in a fashion similar to a sling. A distance of about 50 metres (55 yd) can easily be achieved.

== See also ==
- Atlatl
- Kestros
- Woomera (spear-thrower)
