= Spear chucker =

Spear chucker or Spearchucker can refer to:

- An ethnic slur for people with African ancestry
- Spearchucker Jones, a character from the M*A*S*H film and television series
- Atlatl, the spear chucker
