= John C. Whittaker =

American archaeologist

- Born: John Charles Whittaker; September 6, 1953 (age 73); Richland, Washington
- Known for: Study of flintknapping; Work on atlatls

Academic background
- Education: Cornell University (BA, 1975); University of Arizona (MA, 1979; PhD, 1984)
- Thesis: Arrowheads and Artisans: Stone Tool Manufacture and Individual Variation at Grasshopper Pueblo (1984)

Academic work
- Discipline: Archaeology
- Sub-discipline: Prehistoric archaeology; Experimental archaeology
- Institutions: Grinnell College

John Charles Whittaker (born September 6, 1953) is an American archaeologist and professor at Grinnell College. Whittaker's research focuses on prehistoric technology and experimental archaeology, specializing particularly in stone tools and atlatls. He has also worked in natural history and ecology, zooarchaeology, and paleoethnobotany.

== Early life and education ==
Whittaker studied anthropology at Cornell University. He began to learning to knap flint in his sophomore year, in 1972. Lacking chert or obsidian to practice with, he used the glass from broken soda bottles. Early on, he had to take a brief hiatus from knapping after he accidentally severed two tendons in his left index finger with a glass flake. In his third year at Cornell, Whittaker worked on the archaeological site of Pech de l'Azé in France and studied under François Bordes. Bordes taught Whittaker learned how to knap chert and deepened his interest in the craft. He also met expert knappers Mark Newcomer and Jacques Pelegrin.

Whittaker later attended the University of Arizona as a graduate student, where he continued to work on experimental archaeology. Along with his colleague Harold Dibble, Whittaker developed a mechanical device that flaked stone in a controlled, repeatable manner. This allowed for the precise study of the effects of force on reduction angles. In 1979, Whittaker and Dibble taught a course on experimental archaeology and knapping. Whittaker obtained his master's degree from Arizona in 1979 and his doctorate in 1984.

== Academic career ==
Shortly after completing his PhD in 1984, Whittaker began teaching at Grinnell College, Iowa, where he still has a position as of 2019. He was appointed a full professor in 2001.

Whittaker has worked on multiple sites and regions, including the American Southwest, Western and Eastern Europe, the Middle East, and Central America. He is best known for his contributions to the study of ancient technologies, particularly his work in experimental archaeology by attempting to replicate or approximate past technologies and testing hypotheses and theories about the cultures that used them. This has included research into bronze casting, foraging and cooking, flintknapping, ceramics, and atlatls.

Whittaker has studied ancient and modern flintknappers in both the Old and New Worlds. His 1994 book, Flintknapping: Making and Understanding Stone Tools, is a guide to the practice of lithic reduction for academics and hobbyists, covering the history, mechanics, and techniques of flintknapping.

Whittaker has also investigated atlatls, or spear-throwers. He is a member of the World Atlatl Association, an organization that promotes the use and continued research into atlatls. He is a regular contributor to the organization's journal, The Atlatl. One insight gained from Whittaker's research was the physical effects of prolonged atlatl throwing on the human body, a condition known as "atlatl elbow" (cf. tennis elbow). After years of prolonged use of the tool, Whittaker developed the early stages of the condition, which has also been recorded in ancient remains such as Mungo man. He used this opportunity to study the relationship between atlatl usage and human anatomy, establishing the causes of the condition and how it can be prevented by proper form and stretching.

== Awards ==
- World Atlatl Association, Top 10 Award, 2000, 2001, 2006
- World Atlatl Association, President's Award, 2012

== Selected publications ==
- 1994: Flintknapping: Making and Understanding Stone Tools
- 1999: Surviving Adversity: The Sinagua of Lizard Man Village
- 2004: American Flintknappers: Stone Age Art in the Age of Computers
