= Bannerstone =

Stone weight of debated purpose associated with atlatls

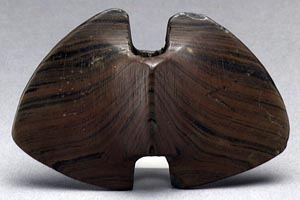
Archaic period double-notched butterfly bannerstone from Ohio, ca. 2000 BC. Made of banded slate, a material frequently used in bannerstone manufacture. Bannerstones were used in North America for some 3,000 years beginning in the fourth millennium BC.

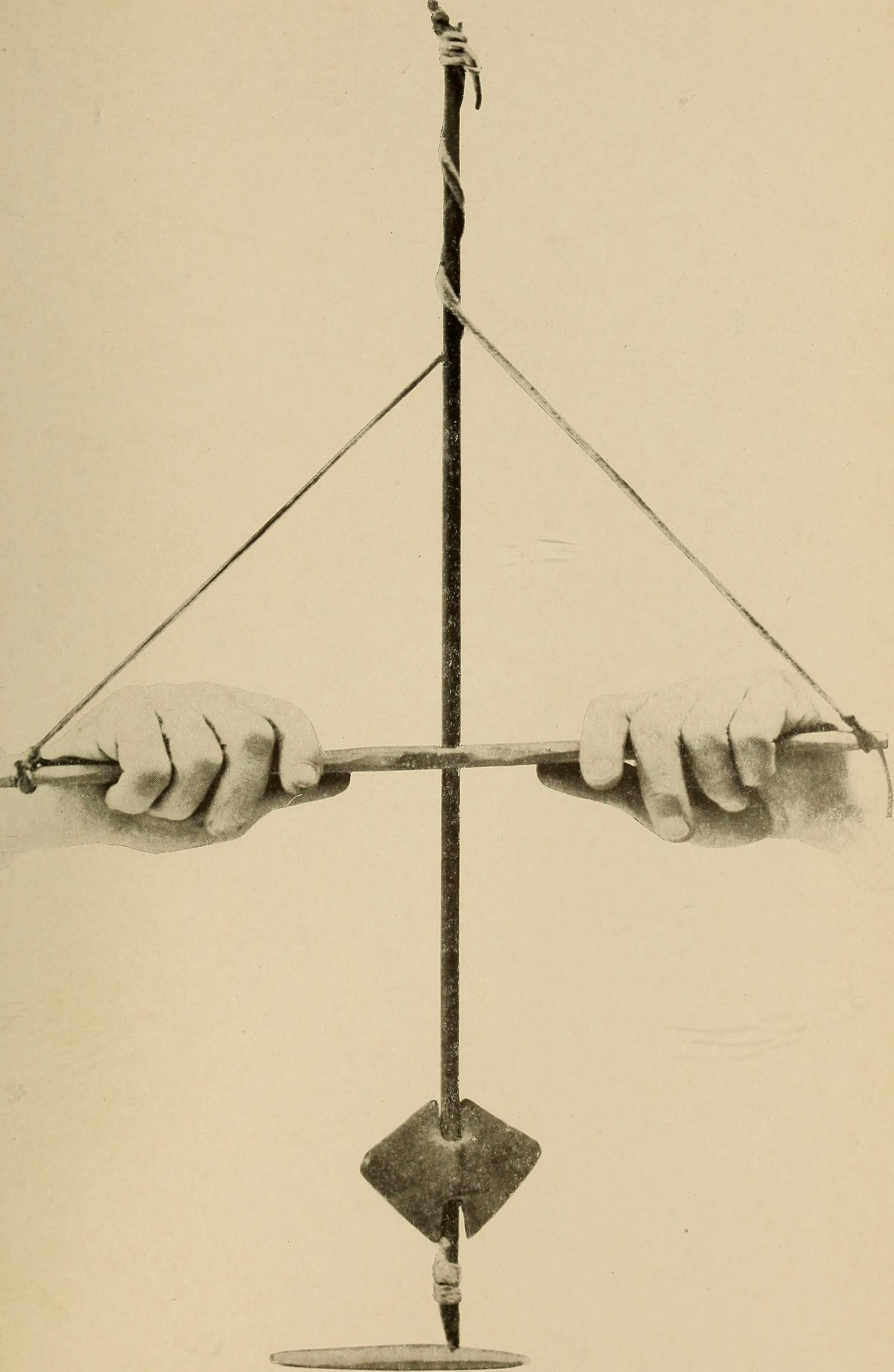
Bannerstone in use as a weight on a bowstring-style hand drill (re-creation)

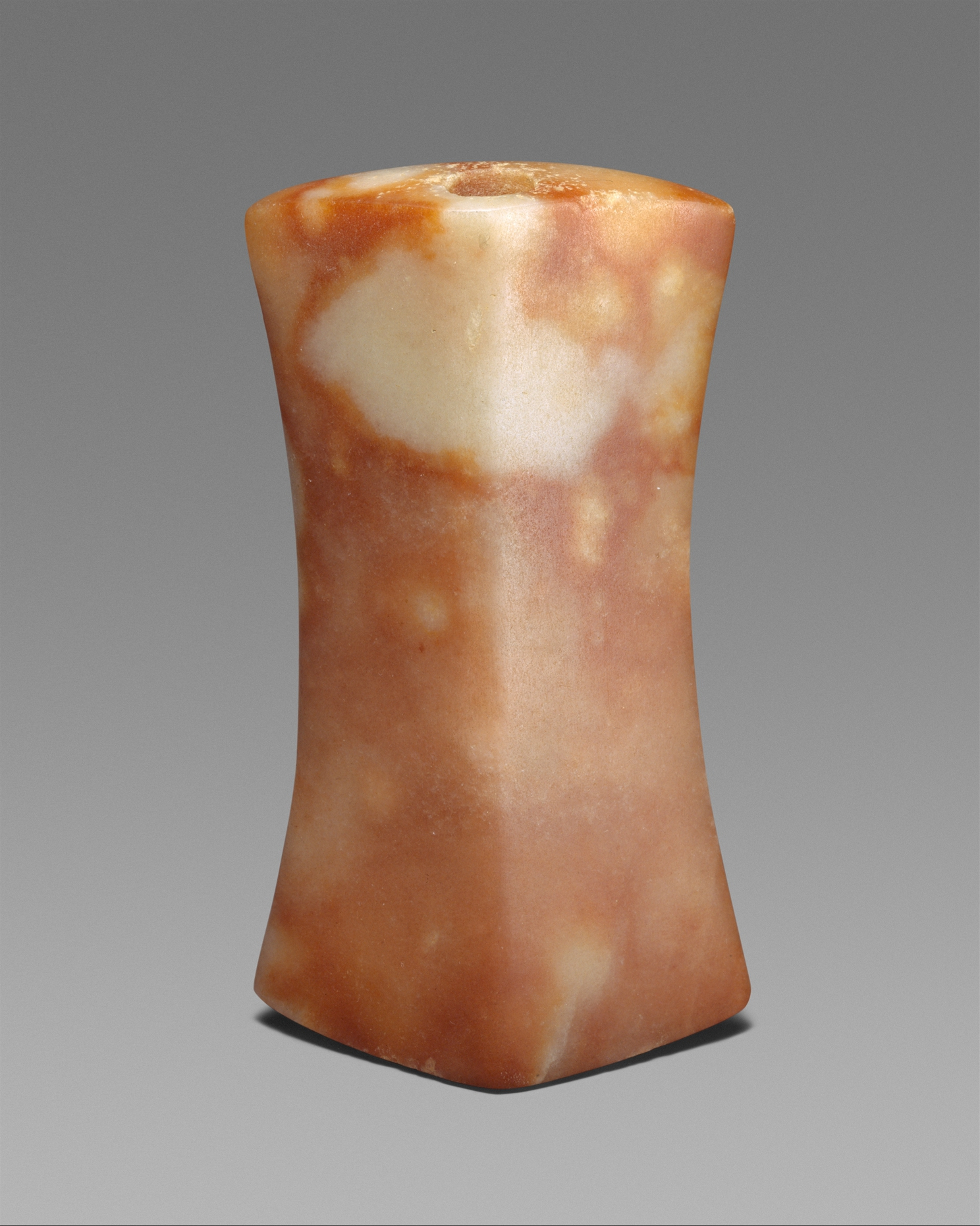
Bannerstone, Ferruginous quartz, 2nd millennium BC. Found in Illinois.

Bannerstones are artifacts usually found in the Eastern United States that are characterized by a centered hole in a symmetrically shaped carved or ground stone. The holes are typically 0.25–0.75 inches (6–20 mm) in diameter and extend through a raised portion centered in the stone. They usually are bored all the way through but some have been found with holes that extend only part of the way through. Many are made from banded slate or other colored hard stone. They often have a geometric "wing nut" or "butterfly" shape but are not limited to these.

== Debates over function ==
Archaeologists have debated over the use of bannerstones. Some have suggested that they are atlatl weights or ceremonial pieces. In situ evidence of bannerstones found in line with atlatl handles and hooks in graves found in Kentucky led to William Webb to propose they were used for atlatl efficiency.

Experimental archaeology suggests that bannerstones were used as counterweights on atlatls, allowing hunters to remain in position while waiting for prey. Larry Kinsella entered an atlatl competition using a bannerstone as a counterweight and performed much worse than he had the year before, when he had entered without the use of the bannerstone. Working in tandem with Herman Pontzer, he then mechanically tested the bannerstone's use as a spear weight and concluded that the bannerstone didn't help with atlatl or spear accuracy; however, it did allow for a more balanced weight during spearhunting, with the bannerstone allowing for a more comfortable hold on the spear over long periods of time.

The ceremonial importance of bannerstones is related to "the psychological uncertainties and physical dangers of daily life among early hunters and gatherers". These peoples appealed to the powers of the stone, their creators or deities, and the natural entities around them for protection and survival in the harsh life of the Archaic Period. Being killed in the hunt is one danger that they would have been trying to protect themselves from, while giving thanks and recognizing the powers guiding their spears thrown from the atlatls would help ensure their success in the hunt. As stated in Hero, Hawk, and Open Hand: American Indian Art of the Ancient Midwest and South, "[bannerstones'] craftsmanship and materials suggest that they also served as emblems of prestige and status conferred upon hunters coming of age, and as supernatural talismans for increasing the spear-throwers efficacy. They may also have served as emblems of clans or other social units." This shows the bannerstone going beyond simple function in the hunt to complex symbolic function in various aspects of society.

Some broken bannerstones were reused, with secondary perforations allowing for rope to be threaded through them; Anna Blume proposes that they could have been used in a ritual context, either threaded as necklaces or suspended from staffs during ceremonies. Some bannerstones were intentionally broken, which Blume views as a ritual process that would transform the bannerstone's purpose from functional to ceremonial.

== History and context ==
Bannerstones, as part of a larger picture, indicate that the societies in which they were a part had greater social organization than those in the past. They also indicate a greater interdependence among tribes of various regions. Brian M. Fagan states that, "the production of elaborate and labor-intensive bannerstones (atlatl weights) and stone vessels makes little sense at a local level, but when produced as objects used in broad exchange networks tied to cooperative alliances, such artifacts have considerable value." This is because, as he further states, "many of the important technological innovations of the Archaic resulted from just such successful alliances which made life more secure in an unpredictable environment of patchy food resources". Therefore, bannerstones can be seen as indicators of ties between societies in the form of trade, whether it is for the stone that the bannerstone is made out of, the region where the finished bannerstone is found, or the way that it is designed. Kenneth Sassaman notes that hypertrophic bannerstones in the Savannah River Valley are found clustered near social gathering sites, and hypertrophic bannerstones on the borders of the Shell Mound Archaic culture could function as emblems of ethnic identity. The wide variety of stones made in their early history could be explained by this as Wardle H. Newell says, "should this group of problematical stones prove to have been personal, as I suspect, the great variety of form would be inevitable". "Innovations" speak of new ideas entering already existing societies and merging with pre-existing beliefs, resulting in artifacts and art forms such as bannerstones.

The Bannerstones started off as smaller sized stones that were shaped into various different forms. These highly finished stones often had mythical or spiritual shapes that showed through these stones. Hinting at the possibility that these bannerstones could serve more of a cultural purpose than just proof of transactions. These symbols take the form of Algonkin symbolism and when taking a look at the pictographic records they match up quite well.

Fagan also states, that "from the Mid Archaic onward, people invested more labor in fashioning socially valued artifacts and ornaments like finely ground 'bannerstones'" to be used in the networks of trade and formation of "alliances." Bannerstones were created for more than just strict physical survival; they were created for spiritual survival and wellbeing as a part of a cosmological system of belief that both varied between groups of archaic peoples and connected them in the eastern woodlands.

The Laurentian is a period of time in the Late Archaic (c. 3200 to c. 1000 BC) that describes the region from New England to Quebec, down into Pennsylvania and New Jersey. The Archaic peoples of this region and time period are one example of a group that produced polished bannerstones.

Bannerstones disappear from the archaeological record c. 1500 BC, though atlatls were used for another 2000 years. While the bannerstones themselves went out of use, the ceremonial and spiritual importance of these objects may have not, possibly being transferred to the new objects that replaced them.

== Notable finds ==
An important archaic site containing numerous graves containing bannerstones is at Indian Knoll, Kentucky. At this site, "few of the bannerstones show signs of use. They are carved of exotic imported stones with an exceptional artistry that exploits the natural colours, patterns, and striations of the stones to afford maximum visual satisfaction". This shows both the importance of long-distance trade in connecting various archaic societies. With trade networks connecting different groups of people, hence, trade prompting intercultural interaction, bannerstones, served to display the differences in ethnic identity among varying groups of people. Alongside trade, specific symbolization behind the selection of the stones that are used to construct the bannerstones is evident in their analysis. Evaluation of the symmetry and polish indicates the knowledge of the people that used these specific stones. The visual analysis of bannerstones also spurs the identification of significance in the context of the owner and spiritual power of the spear-thrower.
