= Kestros (weapon) =

Ancient Greek heavy dart sling

A kestros (Greek: κέστρος) or kestrophendone (Greek: κεστροσφενδόνη), respectively Latinized as cestrus or cestrosphendone, is a specially designed sling that is used to throw a heavy dart.

The dart would typically consist of a heavy metal point approximately 23 cm (9.1 in) long, attached to a shaft of wood, typically 30 cm (12 in) long, and fletched with feathers or similar materials to provide stability of flight.

== History ==
The kestros is mentioned in the writings of Livy and Polybius. It seems to have been invented around 168 BC. and was employed by some of the Macedonian troops of king Perseus of Macedon during the Third Macedonian War. Below are the description of the weapon from Polybius and Livy.

From Polybius:

The so-called cestrus was a novel invention at the time of the war with Perseus. The form of the missile was as follows. It was two cubits (sic, palms) long, the tube being of the same length as the point. Into the former was fitted a wooden shaft a span in length and a finger’s breadth in thickness, and to the middle of this were firmly attached three quite short wing-shaped sticks. The thongs of the sling from which the missile was discharged were of unequal length, and it was so inserted into the loop between them that it was easily freed. There it remained fixed while the thongs were whirled round and taut, but when at the moment of discharge one of the thongs was loosened, it left the loop and was shot like a leaden bullet from the sling, and striking with great force inflicted severe injury on those who were hit by it.

From Livy:

The Romans were in very great danger, for they could not fight in close order against those who were struggling up the hill, and if they left their ranks and ran forward they were exposed to the javelins and arrows. They suffered mainly from the cestrosphendons, a novel kind of weapon invented during the war. It consisted of a pointed iron head two palms long, fastened to a shaft made of pinewood, nine inches long and as thick as a man's finger. Round the shaft three feathers were fastened as in the case of arrows, and the sling was held by two thongs, one shorter than the other. When the missile was poised in the centre of the sling, the slinger whirled it round with great force and it flew out like a leaden bullet. Many of the soldiers were wounded by these and by missiles of all kinds, and they were becoming so exhausted that they were hardly capable of holding their weapons.

The exact construction of the kestrosphendone remains somewhat mysterious; however, experimental reconstructions based on the available information have produced quite spectacular results. Nonetheless, the kestrosphendone did not stand the test of time and appears to have been abandoned quite quickly. The fundamental purpose of this weapon seems to have been to develop a slingshot with the penetrative power of a point. If so, then a lighter version of this weapon, the plumbata, persisted into late antiquity. In this weapon, the wooden shaft gave nearly the same mechanical advantage as a sling. In effect, each sling bolt came with a one-time sling.

Another way of obtaining a one time sling was to fix a string to a slingstone made of lead. There is evidence for this variation at the Battle of Fucine Lake in 89 BC.

It has been suggested that the decline was due to the very tight control needed in the manufacture fin shape for the weapon to work well. If for any reason this was lost the weapon would have become ineffective.
