= Amentum =

Leather strap attached to a javelin used in ancient Greece

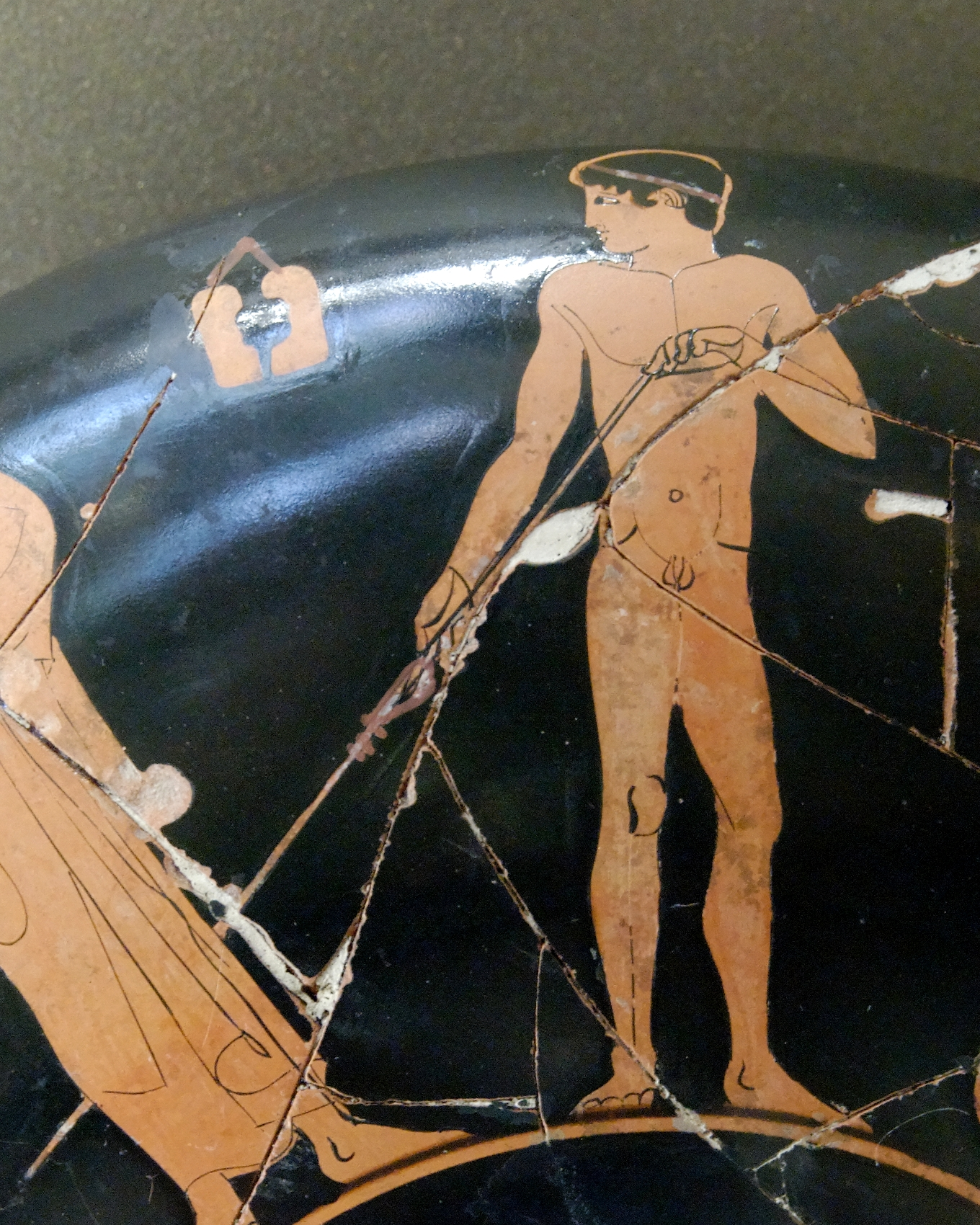
A Greek with an amentum in the right hand

An amentum (Greek: αγκύλη, ankyle,) was a leather strap attached to a javelin used in ancient Greek athletics, hunting, and warfare, which helped to increase the range and the stability of the javelin in flight. Stability in flight was important because it allowed the javelin to land on its point, which was the only way the throw could be accurately recorded in competition or be useful against a live target. An amentum also increased the effective length of the throwing arm similarly to a spear-thrower or Swiss arrow, which enhances the speed of the projectile.

== Throwing technique ==
The javelin was held at ear level and released after a short run. The amentum was looped over the first two fingers of the throwing hand so as to slip off when the throw was made. In competition throwing for distance, including the Ancient Olympic pentathlon at Olympia, Greece, a blunt javelin would be launched at about 45 degrees, but in war or the chase, a sharp weapon was thrown much closer to the horizontal. Javelins and their amenta were used both on foot and from horseback.

The amentum was securely attached at or behind the centre of gravity of the shaft. Attaching the amentum behind the centre of gravity increased the possible distance thrown but reduced accuracy. Hence the amentum was detachable, and the athlete fastened it to suit his taste shortly before use. The winding of the amentum added rotation and therefore accuracy to the projectile, similar to the effect of rifling on a bullet. The experiments conducted by H. A. Harris support the theories based on vase paintings of the proper use of an amentum.

== Performance enhancement ==
In experiments made by General Reffye for Emperor Napoleon III, a javelin that could be thrown only 20 metres by hand could be thrown 80 metres with the amentum. More recent experiments have failed to replicate this level of enhancement, with well-designed tests, showing only a 58% improvement on average.

The advantages of the amentum are the high precision for fast-flying light javelins, and a less demanding construction than atlatl darts.

== Parallels ==
Similar throwing straps were used on light javelins throughout Europe. Italian, Gaulish, and Iberian troops used them before and after the Roman conquests, they are mentioned in use by the Medieval Irish, with the strap referred to as suaineamh, and remains have been found on spears in the Nydam bog finds, where some appear to have been permanently fastened with studs. A similar device was used in New Caledonia, but in the rest of the world, the spear-thrower was the usual device for increasing the speed and range of light javelins.
