= Spear-thrower =

Tool to give more leverage when throwing a spear-like projectile

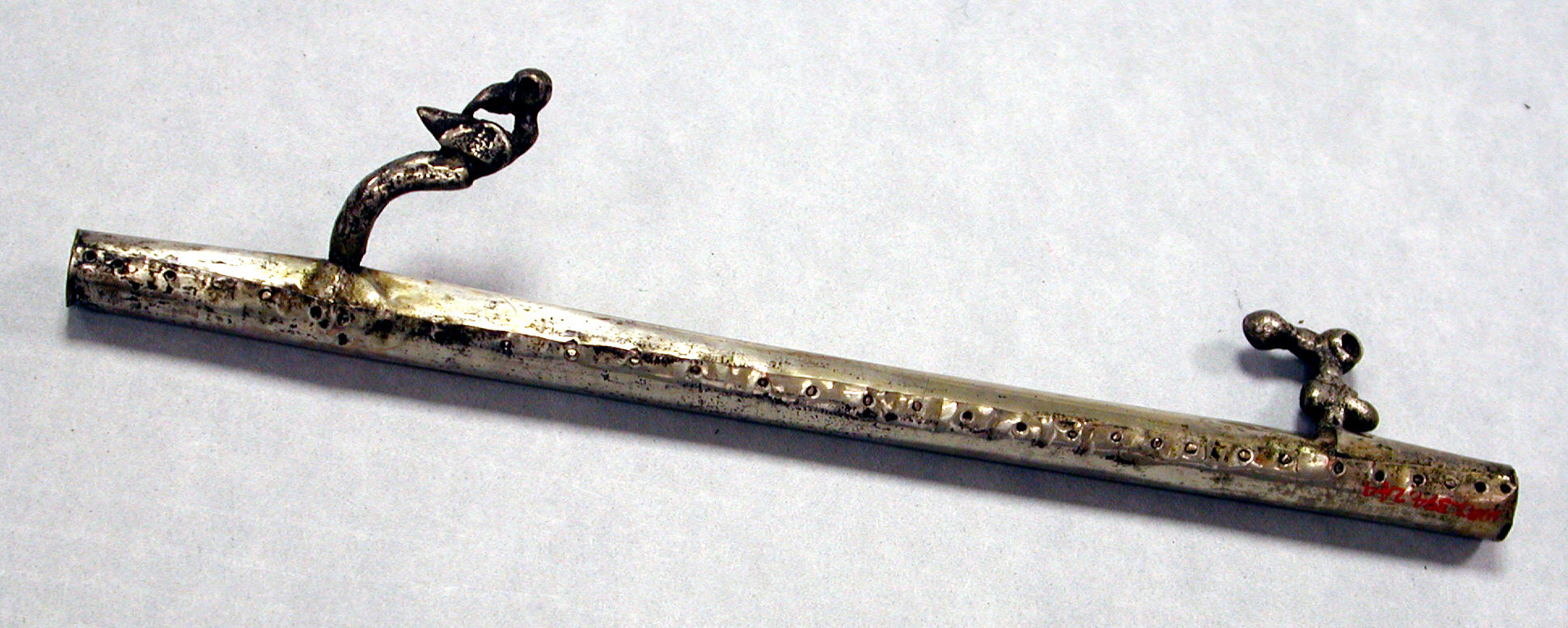
A silver Peruvian atlatl from the 12th–15th century

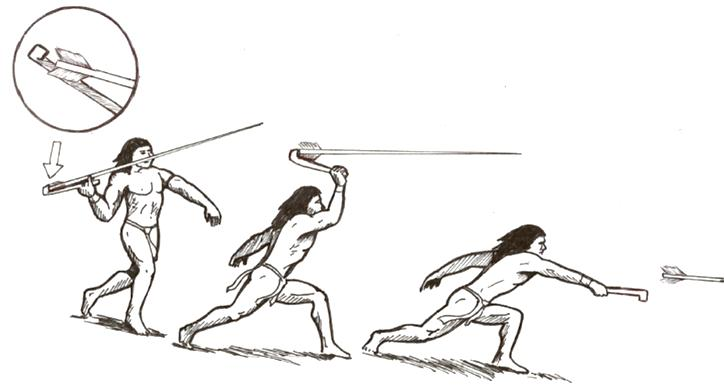
Atlatl in use

A spear-thrower, spear-throwing lever, or atlatl (Note: pronounced /ˈætlætəl/ or /ˈɑːtlɑːtəl/; Nahuatl ahtlatl Nahuatl pronunciation: [ˈaʔt͡ɬat͡ɬ]) is a tool that uses leverage to achieve greater velocity in dart or javelin throwing, and includes a bearing surface that allows the user to store energy during the throw.

It may consist of a shaft with a cup or a spur at the end that supports and propels the butt of the spear. It is usually about as long as the user's arm or forearm. The user holds the spear-thrower in one hand, gripping near the end farthest from the cup. The user puts the butt end of the spear, or dart, in the cup, or grabs the spur with the end of the spear. The spear is much longer than the thrower. The user holds the thrower at the grip end, with the spear resting on the thrower and the butt end of the spear resting in the thrower's cup. The user can hold the spear, with the index and thumb, with the same hand as the thrower, with the other fingers. The user reaches back with the spear pointed at the target. Then the user makes an overhand throwing motion with the thrower while letting go of the spear with the fingers.

The spear is thrown by the action of the upper arm and wrist. The throwing arm together with the atlatl acts as a lever. The spear-thrower is a low-mass, fast-moving extension of the throwing arm, increasing the length of the lever. This extra length allows the thrower to impart force to the dart over a longer distance, thus imparting more energy and higher speeds.

Common modern ball throwers (such as lacrosse sticks, the cestas used in jai alai, and molded plastic arms used for throwing tennis balls for dogs to fetch) use the same principle.

A spear-thrower is a long-range weapon and can readily impart speeds of over 150 km/h (93 mph) to a projectile.

Spear-throwers appear early in human history in several parts of the world, and have survived in use in traditional societies until the present day, as well as being revived in recent years for sporting purposes. In the Americas, the Nahuatl word atlatl is often used for revived uses of spear-throwers (or the Mayan word hul'che); in Australia, the Dharug word woomera is used instead.

The ancient Greeks and Romans used a leather thong or loop, known as an ankule or amentum, as a spear-throwing device. The Swiss arrow is a weapon that works similarly to an amentum.

Pacific islanders of New Caledonia used a spear thrower similar to the ones used by the ancient Greeks and Romans called a "doigtier". It is not a direct translation of the name and was given by the French colonists that experimented with the tool. It was a thick string wrapped around a dart that gave it spin when it was thrown.

Using replicas of spear-throwers known from the Basketmaker culture and the Basketmaker II era, and using darts of different weights, it has been found that the maximum exit velocity a historical spear-thrower can achieve is 72–108 km/h (45–67 mph). Measurement methods include radar guns, gun chronographs, and analysis of high speed films, to cross-check the results. For comparison, a 25 lb self bow shoots arrows with an exit velocity of 129 km/h (80 mph), while a replica of a 45 lb self bow from the Catawba tribe achieves speeds of 160 km/h (99 mph). Claims of higher speeds of 160 km/h (99 mph) or even higher for historical self-throwers are probably due to improper measurement methods for this class of weapon.

The momentum gained by a spear thrower's dart is 1.8–2.7 kg⋅m/s, while that of a Catawba bow's arrow is 1.5 kg⋅m/s. A .357 magnum round of 158 grain gains a momentum of 3.58 kg⋅m/s.

== Design ==
Depiction of an atlatl

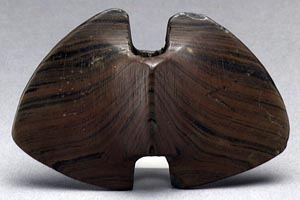
Bannerstone atlatl weight, c. 2000 BC. Archaic peoples; Ohio

Spear-thrower designs may include improvements such as thong loops to fit the fingers, the use of flexible shafts or stone balance weights. Dart shafts can be made thinner and highly flexible for added power and range, the fletching can be spiralized to add spin to the dart making it more stable and accurate. Darts resemble large arrows or small spears and are typically from 1.2 to 2.7 m (4 to 9 ft) in length and 9 to 16 mm (3/8 to 5/8 in) in diameter. Indigenous people on the Andean Altiplano during the middle archaic period adapted their projectile points to a larger size, along with a switch to mammal bones to increase accuracy and weight during a hunt.

Another important improvement to the spear-thrower's design was the introduction of a small weight (between 60 and 80 grams) strapped to its midsection. Some atlatlists maintain that stone weights add mass to the shaft of the device, causing resistance to acceleration when swung and resulting in a more forceful and accurate launch of the dart. Others claim that spear-thrower weights add only stability to a cast, resulting in greater accuracy.

Based on previous work done by William S. Webb, William R. Perkins claims that spear-thrower weights, commonly called "bannerstones", and characterized by a centered hole in a symmetrically shaped carved or ground stone, shaped wide and flat with a drilled hole and thus a little like a large wingnut, are an improvement to the design that created a silencing effect when swung. The use of the device would reduce the telltale "zip" of a swung atlatl to a more subtle "woof" sound that did not travel as far and was less likely to alert prey. Robert Berg's theory is that the bannerstone was carried by hunters as a spindle weight to produce string from natural fibers gathered while hunting, for the purpose of tying on fletching and hafting stone or bone points.

=== Woomera ===
The woomera, or ‘miru’, allows hunters to apply more force, speed and distance when launching their spears. A woomera is usually made from Mulga wood, and serves many other purposes such as a: receptacle for mixing ochre for traditional paintings for ceremonies, deflection tool of enemies’ spears in battle, fire making saw, or a utensil for chopping game. This tool is usually 60 cm (24 in) long and 12 cm (4.7 in) wide, and comes in a concave, elliptical shape.

=== Artistic designs ===
Several Stone Age spear-throwers (usually now incomplete) are decorated with carvings of animals: the British Museum has one decorated with a mammoth, and there is one decorated with a hyena in France. Many pieces of decorated bone may have belonged to bâtons de commandement.

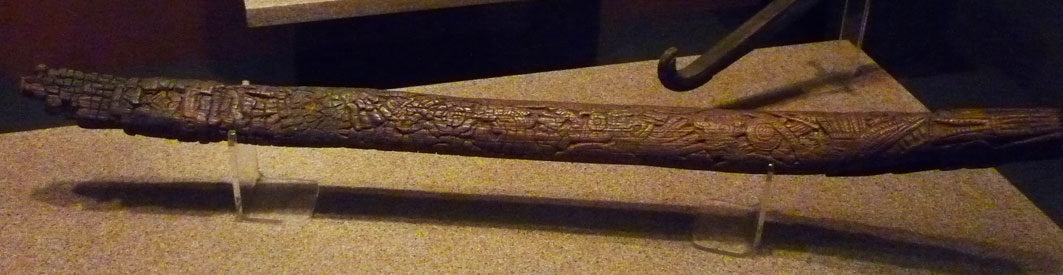
Carved Aztec atlatl at the National Museum of Anthropology and History in Mexico City

The Aztec atlatl was often decorated with snake designs and feathers, potentially evocative of its association with Ehecatl, the Aztec wind deity.

== History ==
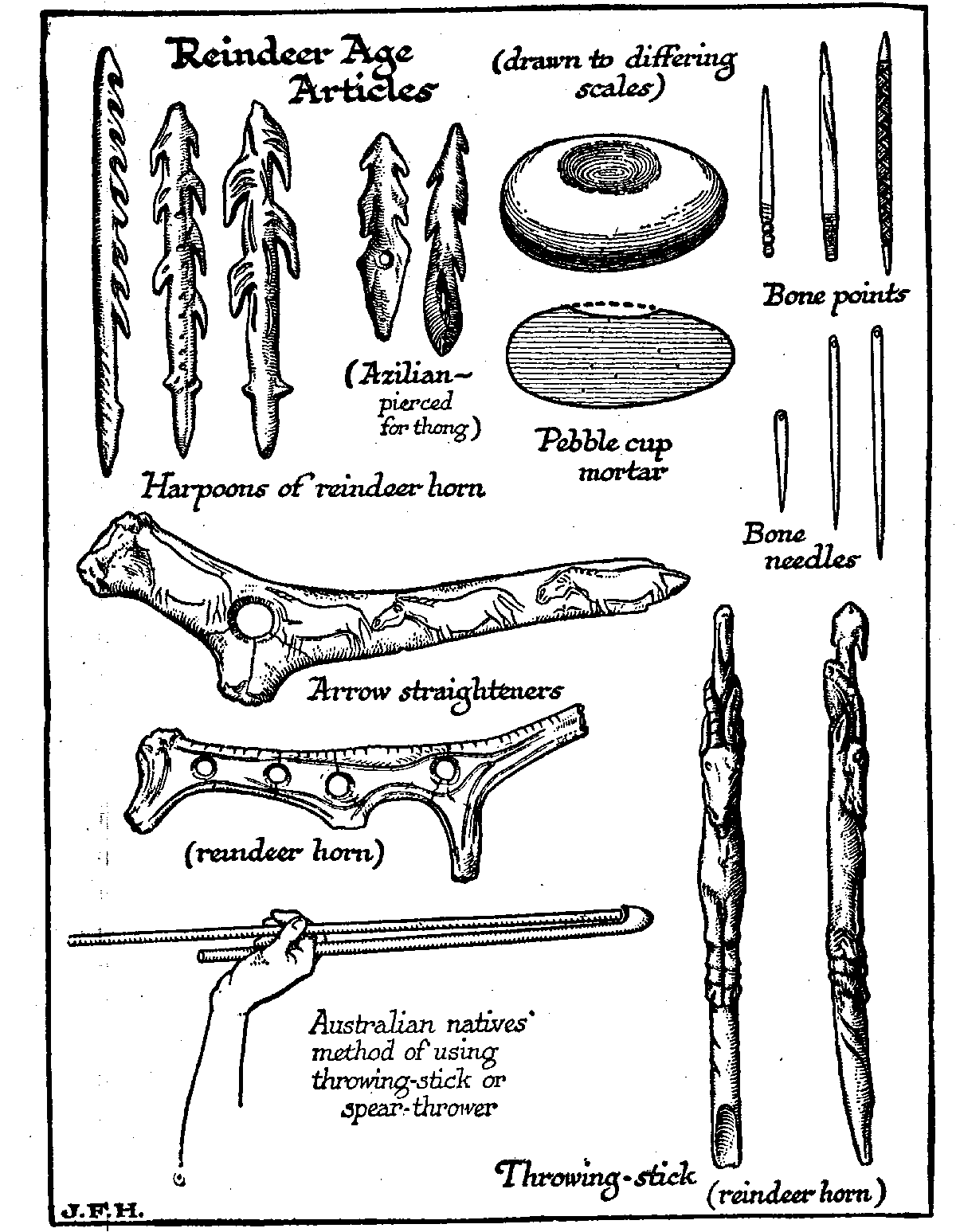
Upper Paleolithic articles

Wooden spears date back to at least 400,000 years ago, as indicated by the Clacton Spear and the Schöningen spears. While the spear-thrower is capable of casting a dart well over one hundred meters, it is most accurately used at distances of twenty meters or less. The spearthrower is believed to have been in use by Homo sapiens since the Upper Paleolithic (around 30,000 years ago). Most stratified European finds come from the Magdalenian (late upper Palaeolithic). In this period, elaborate pieces, often in the form of animals, are common. The earliest reliable data concerning atlatls have come from several caves in France dating to the Upper Paleolithic, about 21,000 to 17,000 years ago. The earliest known example is a 17,500-year-old Solutrean atlatl made of reindeer antler, found at Combe Saunière (Dordogne), France. It is possible that the atlatl was invented earlier than this, as Mungo Man from 42,000 BP displays arthritis in his right elbow, a pathology referred to today as the "Atlatl elbow," resulting from many years of forceful torsion from using an atlatl. At present, there is no evidence for the use of atlatls in Africa. Peoples such as the Maasai and Khoisan throw spears without any aids, but the use of atlatls in hunting is limited in comparison to spears because the animal must be close and already immobile.

During the Ice Age, the atlatl was used by humans to hunt megafauna. Ice Age megafauna offered a large food supply when other game was limited, and the atlatl gave more power to pierce their thicker skin. In this time period, atlatls were usually made of wood or bone. Improvements made to spears' edge made it more efficient as well.

In Europe, the spear-thrower was supplemented by the bow and arrow in the Epi-Paleolithic. Along with improved ease of use, the bow offered the advantage that the bulk of elastic energy is stored in the throwing device, rather than the projectile. Arrow shafts can therefore be much smaller and have looser tolerances for spring constant and weight distribution than atlatl darts. This allowed for more forgiving flint knapping: dart heads designed for a particular spear thrower tend to differ in mass by only a few percent. By the Iron Age, the amentum, a strap attached to the shaft, was the standard European mechanism for throwing lighter javelins. The amentum gives not only range, but also spin to the projectile.

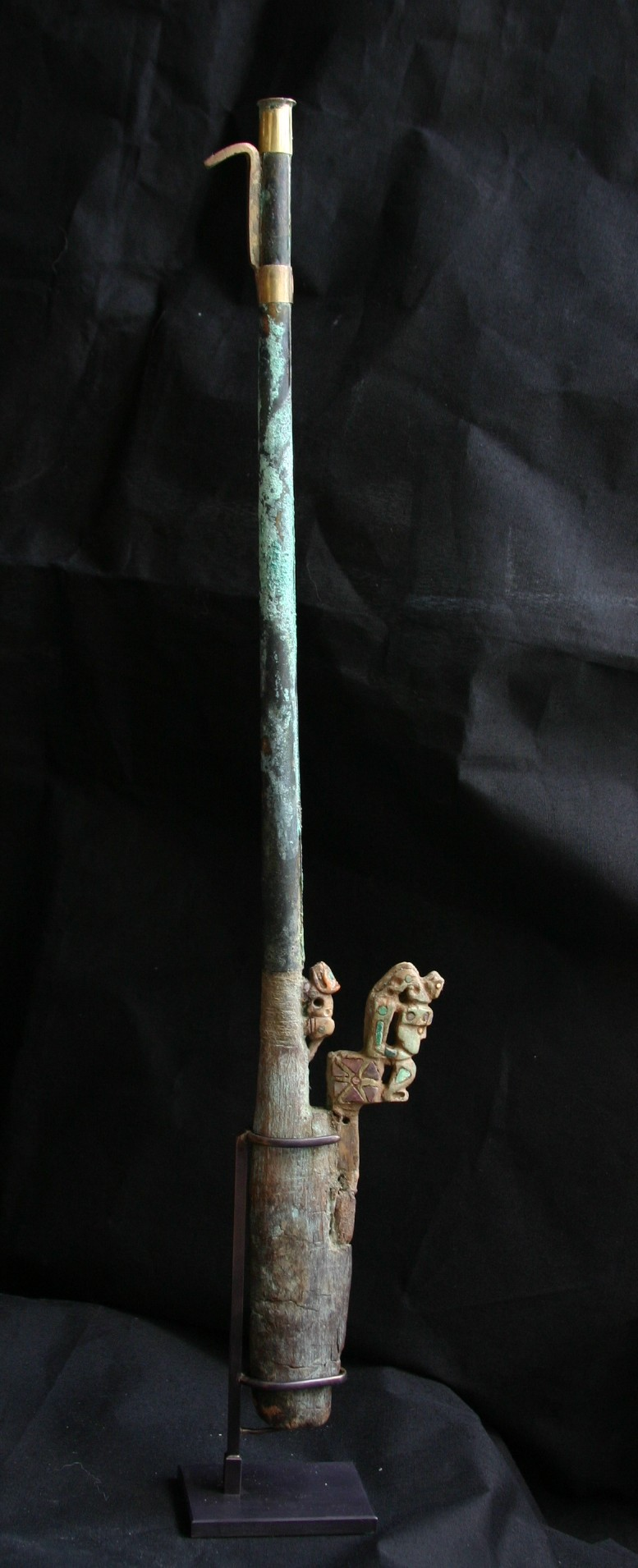
Ceremonial spear thrower, Peru, 1–300 A.D., Lombards Museum

The spear-thrower was used by early Americans as well. It may have been introduced to America during the immigration across the Bering Land Bridge, and despite the later introduction of the bow and arrow, atlatl use was widespread at the time of first European contact. Atlatls are represented in the art of multiple pre-Columbian cultures, including the Basketmaker culture in the American Southwest, Maya in the Yucatán Peninsula, and Moche in the Andes of South America. Atlatls were especially prominent in the iconography of the warriors of the Teotihuacan culture of Central Mexico. A ruler from Teotihuacan named Spearthrower Owl is an important figure described in Mayan stelae. Complete wooden spear-throwers have been found on dry sites in the western United States and in waterlogged environments in Florida and Washington. Several Amazonian tribes also used the atlatl for fishing and hunting. Some even preferred this weapon over the bow and arrow and used it not only in combat but also in sports competitions. Such was the case with the Tarairiú, a Tapuya tribe of migratory foragers and raiders inhabiting the forested mountains and highland savannahs of Rio Grande do Norte in mid-17th-century Brazil. Anthropologist Harald Prins offers the following description:

The atlatl, as used by these Tarairiu warriors, was unique in shape. About 88 cm (35 in) long and 3 to 4.5 cm (1 1/4 to 1 3/4 in) wide, this spear thrower was a tapering piece of wood carved of brown hard-wood. Well-polished, it was shaped with a semi-circular outer half and had a deep groove hollowed out to receive the end of the javelin, which could be engaged by a horizontal wooden peg or spur lashed with a cotton thread to the proximal and narrower end of the throwing board, where a few scarlet parrot feathers were tied for decoration. [Their] darts or javelins ... were probably made of a two-meter long wooden cane with a stone or long and serrated hard-wood point, sometimes tipped with poison. Equipped with their uniquely grooved atlatl, they could hurl their long darts from a great distance with accuracy, speed, and such deadly force that these easily pierced through the protective armor of the Portuguese or any other enemy.

The spear-thrower was an important part of life, hunting, and religion in the ancient Andes. The earliest known spear-thrower of the South Americas had a proximal handle piece and is commonly referred to as an estólica in Spanish references to indigenous Andean culture. Estólica and atlatl are therefore synonymous terms. The estólica is best known archaeologically from Nazca culture and the Inca civilization, but the earliest examples are known from associations with Chinchorro mummies. The estólica is also known from Moche culture, including detailed representations on painted pottery, and in representations on textiles of the Wari culture.

The Andean estólica had a wooden body with a hook that was made of stone or metal. These hooks have been found at multiple highland sites including Cerro Baúl, a site of the Wari culture. In the Andes, the tips of darts were often capped with metal. Arrow points commonly had the same appearance as these Andean tips. The length of a common estòlica was about 50 cm. Estólica handles were commonly carved and modeled to represent real world accounts like animals and deities. Along with this, archeological evidence from the Andean highlands show that many Estólica's were created out of mammal bone. Experimental replication demonstrates that bone was implemented and an effective alternative that can be produced relatively quickly.

Examples of estòlicas with no handle pieces have been interpreted as children's toys. Archaeologists found decorated examples in the Moche culture burial of the Lady of Cao at El Brujo in the Chicama valley. At her feet was a group of twenty-three atlatls with handle pieces that depicted birds. These “theatrical” estòlicas are different from normal weapons. They are much longer (80–100 cm) than the regular examples (50–60 cm). Archeologists John Whittaker and Kathryn Kamp, both faculty from Grinnell College, speculate that they might have been part of a ceremony before the burial or symbolic references to indicate that the royal woman in the burial had been a warrior.

Estólicas are depicted along with maces, clubs, and shields on Moche vessels that illustrate warfare. The atlatl appears in the artwork of Chavín de Huantar, such as on the Black and White Portal.

Among the Tlingit of Southeast Alaska, approximately one dozen old elaborately carved specimens they call "shee áan" (sitting on a branch) remain in museum collections and private collections, one having sold at auction for more than $100,000.

In September 1997, an atlatl dart fragment, carbon dated to 4360 ± 50 ^{14}C yr BP (TO 6870), was found in an ice patch on mountain Thandlät, the first of the southern Yukon Ice Patches to be studied.

The people of New Guinea and Aboriginal people in Australia also use spear-throwers. In the mid Holocene, Aboriginal people in Australia developed spear-throwers, known as woomeras.

As well as its practical use as a hunting weapon, it may also have had social effects. John Whittaker suggests the device was a social equalizer in that it requires skill rather than muscle power alone. Thus, women and children would have been able to participate in hunting.

Whittaker said the stone-tipped projectiles from the Aztec atlatl were not powerful enough to penetrate Spanish steel plate armor, but they were strong enough to penetrate the mail, leather and cotton armor that most Spanish soldiers wore. Whittaker said the Aztecs started their battles with atlatl darts followed with melee combat using the macuahuitl.

== Bâtons de commandement ==
Another type of Stone Age artefact that is sometimes excavated is the bâton de commandement. These are shorter, normally less than one foot long, and made of antler, with a hole drilled through them. When first found in the nineteenth century, they were interpreted by French archaeologists to be symbols of authority, like a modern field marshal's baton, and so named bâtons de commandement ("batons of command"). Though debate over their function continues, tests with replicas have found them effective aids to spear or dart throwing when used with a cord. Another theory is that they were "arrow-straighteners".

== Bian Jian ("Spear sling") ==
Bian Jian (Chinese: 鞭箭, lit. 'Whip arrow') is a unique spear-thrower that was used during Song period. It can be described as a long staff sling that throws a spear-sized dart instead of a rock-like projectile. It requires two operators unlike other spear-throwers. It should not be confused with another Bian Jian (邊箭).

== Modern times ==
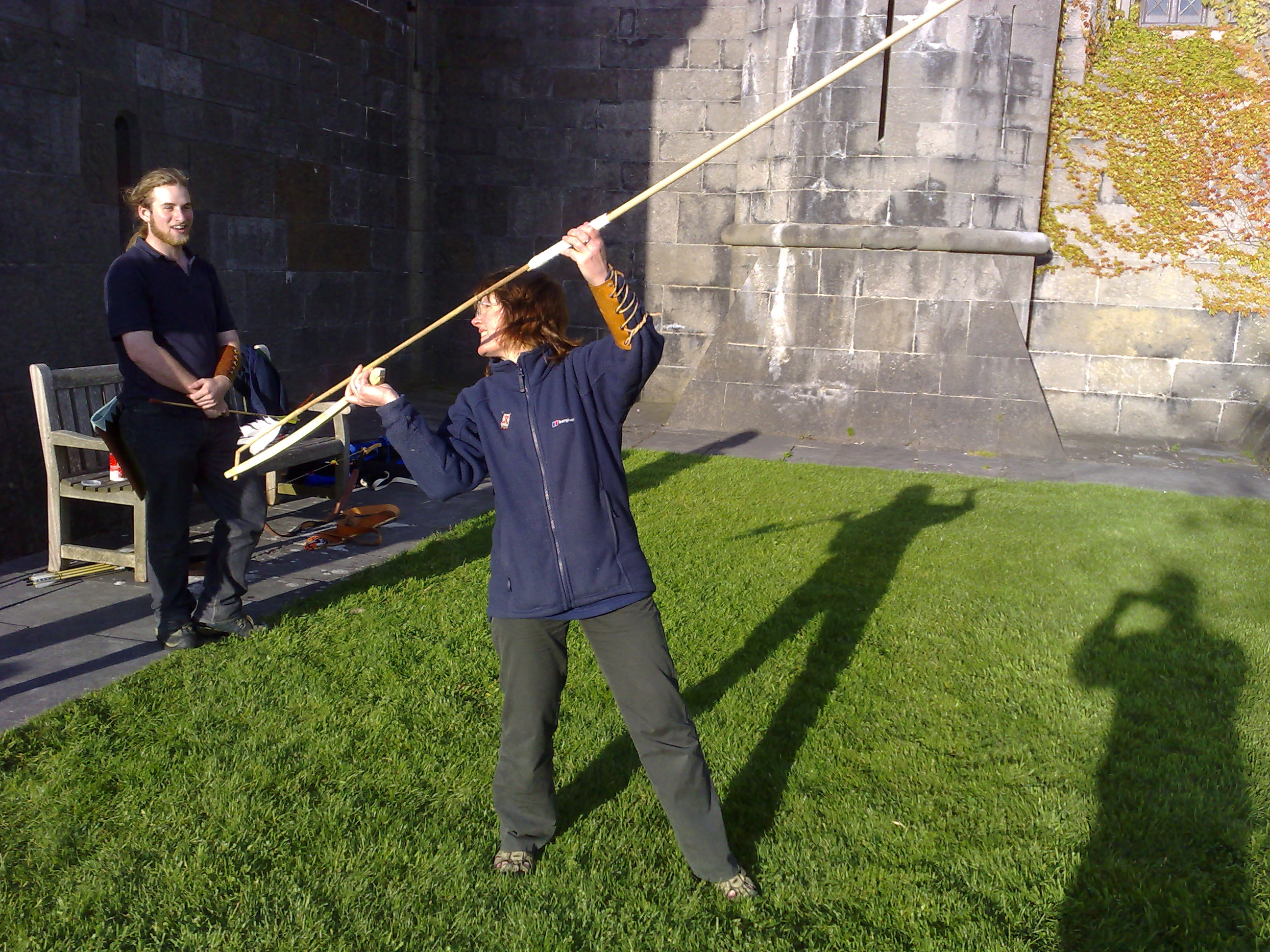
The user is checking to see that the spear has been correctly located on the spur of the spear-thrower. Next she turns her head in the other direction, aims, and throws.

An atlatl being used to throw a spear in slow motion.

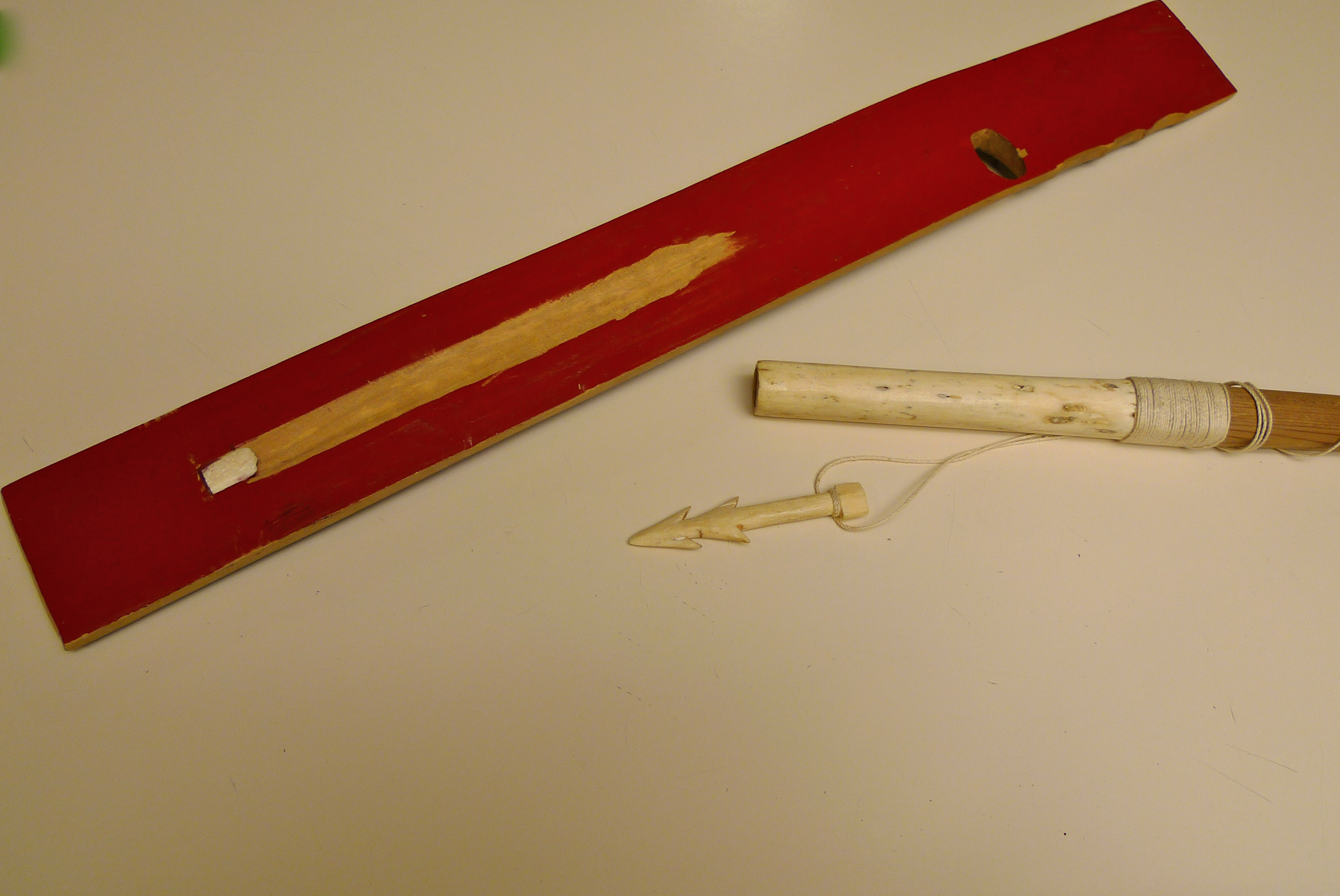
An Aleut atlatl from Nikolski, made in 1976

In modern times, some people have resurrected the dart thrower for sports, often using the term atlatl, throwing either for distance and/or for accuracy. The World Atlatl Association was formed in 1987 to promote the atlatl. Throws of almost 260 m (850 ft) have been recorded. Colleges reported to field teams in this event include Grinnell College in Iowa, Franklin Pierce University in New Hampshire, Alfred University in New York, and the University of Vermont.

Atlatls are sometimes used in modern times for hunting. In the U.S., the Pennsylvania Game Commission has given preliminary approval for legalization of the atlatl for hunting certain animals. The animals that would be allowed to atlatl hunters have yet to be determined, but particular consideration has been given to deer. Currently, Alabama allows the atlatl for deer hunting, while a handful of other states list the device as legal for rough fish (those not sought for sport or food), some game birds and non-game mammals. Starting in 2007, Missouri allowed use of the atlatl for hunting wildlife (excluding deer and turkey), and starting in 2010, also allowed deer hunting during the firearms portion of the deer season (except the muzzleloader portion). Starting in 2012, Missouri allowed the use of atlatls during the fall archery deer and turkey hunting seasons and, starting in 2014, allowed the use of atlatls during the spring turkey hunting season as well. Missouri also allows use of the atlatl for fishing, with some restrictions (similar to the restrictions for spearfishing and bowfishing). The Nebraska Game and Parks Commission allows the use of atlatls for the taking of deer as of 2013.

The woomera is still used today by some Aboriginal people for hunting in Australia. Yup'ik hunters still use the atlatl, known locally as the nuqaq, in villages near the mouth of the Yukon River for seal hunting.

=== Competitions ===
There are numerous atlatl competitions held every year, with spears and spear-throwers built using both ancient and modern materials. Events are often held at parks, such as Letchworth State Park in New York, Cahokia Mounds State Historic Site in Illinois, or Valley of Fire State Park in Nevada. Atlatl associations around the world host a number of local atlatl competitions. Chimney Point State Historic Site in Addison, Vermont hosts the annual Northeast Open Atlatl Championship. In 2009, the Fourteenth Annual Open Atlatl Championship was held on Saturday and Sunday, September 19 and 20. On the Friday before the Championship, a workshop was held to teach modern and traditional techniques of atlatl and dart construction, flint knapping, hafting stone points, and cordage making. Competitions may be held in conjunction with other events, such as the Ohio Pawpaw Festival, or at the Bois D'Arc Primitive Skills Gathering and Knap-in, held every September in southern Missouri.

Atlatl events commonly include the International Standard Accuracy Competition (ISAC), in which contestants throw ten times at a bull's-eye target. Other contests involving different distances or terrain may also be included, usually testing the atlatlist's accuracy rather than distance throwing.

=== Popular culture ===
In the sixth episode of the fourth season of the television competition Top Shot, the elimination round consisted of two contestants using the atlatl at ranges of 30, 45 and 60 feet.

An atlatl was the weapon of choice of a serial killer in the 2020 action-thriller The Silencing, where it is erroneously described as an illegal weapon.

Lydia Demarek, a character in the popular fantasy novel series Brotherband, owns and often uses an atlatl.

In the light novel series Evangelion ANIMA, an enemy known as a Victor uses a form of atlatl as a weapon.

In Campaign 4 of the Critical Role web series, the player character Kattigan Vale, played by Robbie Daymond, uses an atlatl.

In the MMORPG Old School RuneScape, the continent of Varlamore is heavily inspired by Central and South America, with even their language being inspired by Nahuatl, the Aztec language. One of the weapons the player can acquire from a boss in the region is the Eclipse atlatl.

== See also ==
- Amentum
- Aztec warfare
- Hunter-gatherer societies
- Kestros
- Swiss arrow
- Woomera (spear-thrower)
