= Woomera (spear-thrower) =

Australian Aboriginal spear-throwing device

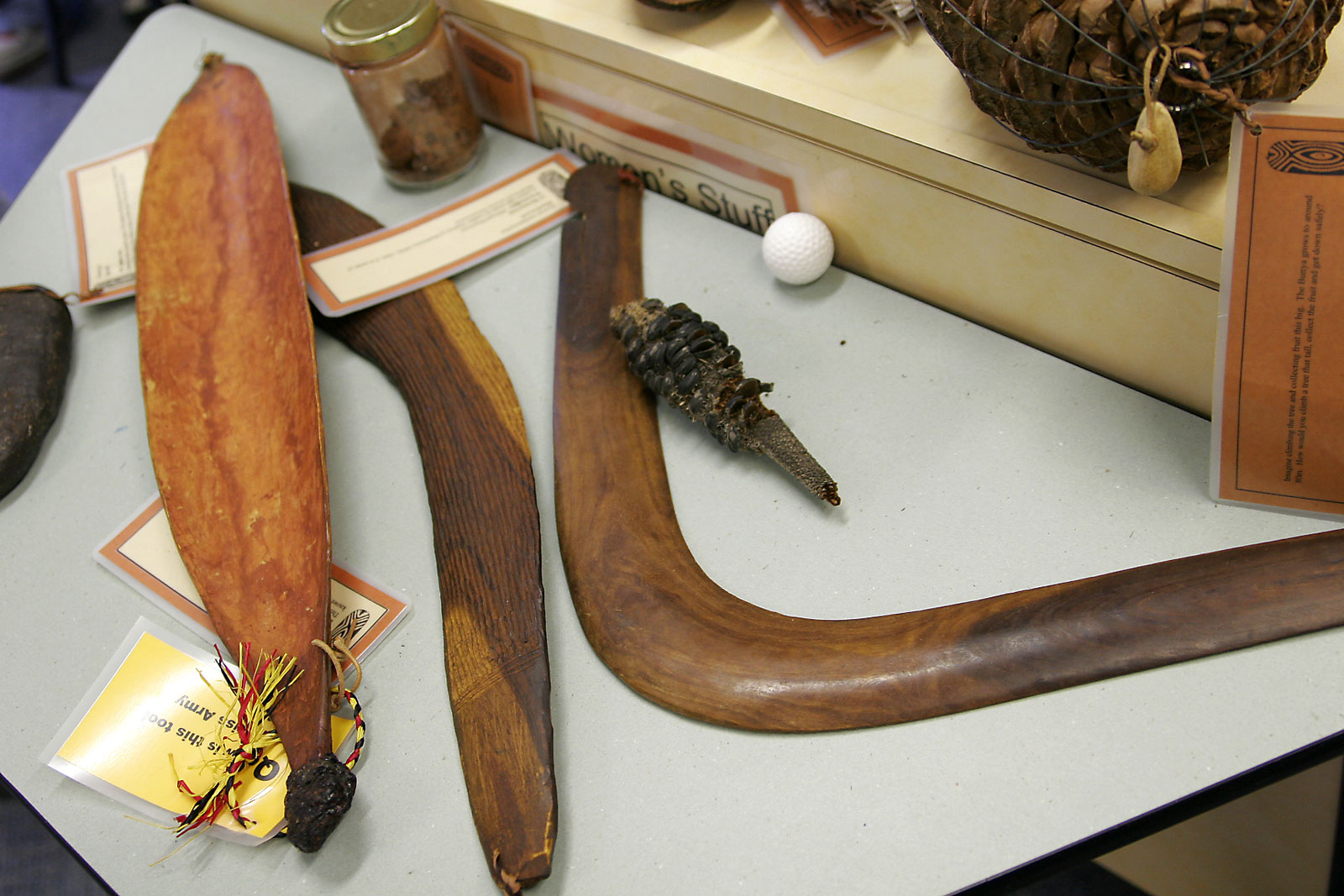
The woomera in this picture is the wooden object at left.

Mokare with spear and woomera. Another woomera lies at his feet.

A woomera is an Australian Aboriginal wooden spear-throwing device. Similar to an atlatl, it serves as an extension of the human arm, enabling a spear to travel at a greater speed and force than possible with only the arm.

== Name ==
The word woomera comes from the Dharug language of the Eora people of the Sydney basin. The name was adopted for the town of Woomera, South Australia, founded in 1947 as the home of the Anglo-Australian Long Range Weapons Establishment, also known as the "Woomera Rocket Range" and now called RAAF Woomera Range Complex.

== Description ==
The woomera is between 61 and 91 cm (24 and 36 in) in length. It is a left-handed tool. Like many Australian Aboriginal tools, there is much diversity in design. Some versions have one end that is 7.6 cm (3.0 in) wide and possessing a hollow, curved cross-section not unlike an airfoil, while the other is more pointed and has a hook. Other versions used in northern Australia are less than 2.5 cm (0.98 in) wide, made of flat wood, with a wooden point angled back along the flat length of the woomera, fixed with wax from spinifex grass seeds. Some woomera were traditionally decorated with incised or painted designs that indicated belonging to a particular linguistic group that it may be returned to if found abandoned.

== Use ==
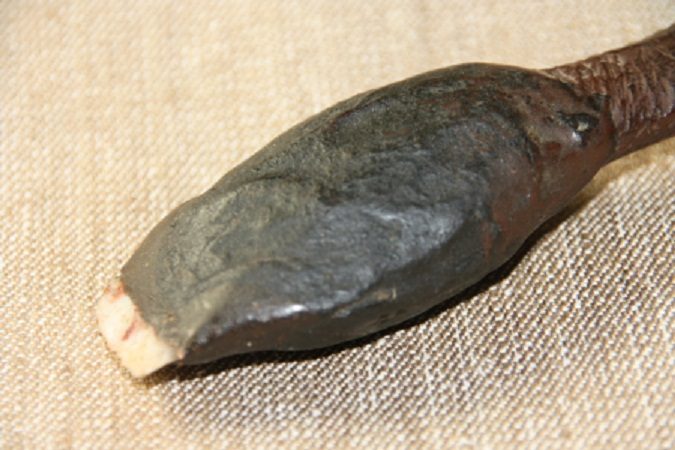
A sharp stone attached to the end of the handle

Records show that the implement began to be used about 5,000 years ago, although the Mungo Man remains from at least 43,000 years ago show severe osteoarthritis in the left elbow associated with the use of a woomera. It is still used today in some remote areas of Australia. Like spears and boomerangs, woomeras were traditionally used only by men. Some woomeras, especially those used in the central and western Australian deserts, were multi-purpose tools. Often shaped like long narrow bowls, they could be used for carrying water-soaked vegetable matter (which would not spill and could later be sucked for its moisture) as well as small food items such as little birds or seeds. Many woomeras had a sharp stone cutting edge called a tula adze attached to the end of the handle with black gum from the triodia plant. This sharp tool had many uses, such as cutting up game or other food and wood. It is supposed that the woomera could be used as a shield for protection against spears and boomerangs. The woomera is held in one hand while the other hand places the butt of the spear on the woomera's hook; the hollow curved shape facilitates this alignment without looking. The woomera effectively lengthens the thrower's arm, greatly increasing the velocity of the spear. Correcting for the game animal's lateral dodging is accomplished by tilting the wing-shape woomera during the throw for last-second corrections. The kinetic energy of a spear launched from a woomera has been calculated as four times that of an arrow launched from a compound bow.

Different Aboriginal groups had different shapes and styles of woomera. For example, the woomera of the central desert tend to be very wide and slightly bowl-shaped whereas those of the Kimberley are flat, long and narrow.
