= List of types of spears =

This is a list of types of spears found worldwide throughout history.

== Used equally in melee and thrown ==
- Migration Period spear

== Normally melee ==
- Bayonet (when fixed to a Long gun)

=== Asia ===
- Arbir
- Bambu Runcing
- Dangpa
- Gichang
- Hoko yari
- Ji
- Kama-yari
- Qiang
- Sibat
- Trishula
- Yari
- Naginata
- Assegai

=== Europe ===
- Ahlspiess
- Boar spear
- Bohemian earspoon
- Brandistock
- Dory
- Fauchard
- Goedendag
- Halberd
- Half pike
- Hasta
- Military fork
- Ox tongue spear
- Partisan
- Pike
- Plançon a picot
- Ranseur
- Sarissa
- Spetum
- Spontoon
- Trident
- Glaive

=== Elsewhere ===
- Hoeroa (Māori, New Zealand)
- Iklwa (Zulu)
- Makrigga (Zande)
- Tepoztopilli (Aztec)

== Normally used from horseback ==
- Barcha
- Kontos
- Lance
- Xyston

== Normally thrown ==
- Harpoon
  - One flue harpoon
  - Two flue harpoon

=== Europe ===
- Angon
- Falarica
- Framea
- Golo
- Hak
- Jaculum
- Javelin
- Lancea
- Pilum
- Plumbata
- Soliferrum
- Spiculum
- Verutum

=== Elsewhere ===
- Assegai (Africa)
- Djerid (Asia Minor, India and Africa)
- Toggling harpoon (Americas)
