= Flue (disambiguation) =

A flue is a duct, pipe, or chimney for removing exhaust gases to the outdoors.

Flue may also refer to:

- 27764 von Flüe, a minor planet
- Flue pipe, a type of organ pipe
- Äbeni Flue, a mountain in the Bernese Alps in Switzerland
- Tiejer Flue, a mountain in the Swiss Alps
- Part of a one flue harpoon, a type of harpoon
  - Parts of a two flue harpoon, an earlier type of harpoon

== People named Flue ==
- Jason Von Flue (born 1975), mixed martial artist
- Saint Nicholas of Flüe (1417–1487), Swiss hermit and patron saint of Switzerland
