= Spear =

Polearm with a long shaft and pointed head used for thrusting or throwing

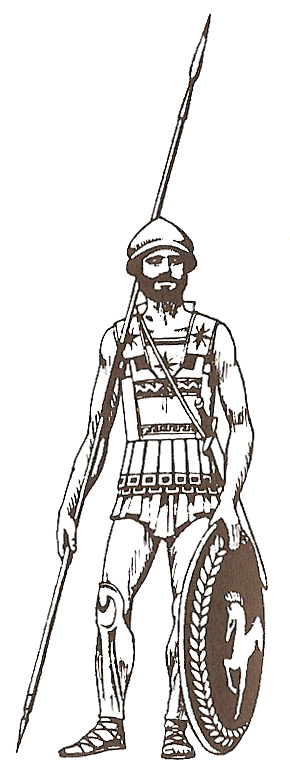
Spear-armed hoplite from Greco-Persian Wars

A spear is a polearm consisting of a shaft, usually of wood, with a pointed head. The head may be simply the sharpened end of the shaft itself, as is the case with fire hardened spears, or it may be made of a more durable material fastened to the shaft, such as bone, flint, obsidian, copper, bronze, iron, or steel. The most common design for hunting and/or warfare, since modern times has incorporated a metal spearhead shaped like a triangle, diamond, or leaf. The heads of fishing spears usually feature multiple sharp points, with or without barbs.

Spears can be divided into two broad categories: those designed for thrusting as a melee weapon (including weapons such as lances and pikes) and those designed for throwing as a ranged weapon (usually referred to as javelins). Larger spears were often held in end-braced position to impale charging cavalry, and in hunting bears, big cats and other animals that charge or lunge toward the hunter.

Spears have been used by humans for at least 400,000 years as weapons for hunting and/or fishing and for warfare. Along with the club, knife, and axe, it is one of the earliest and most widespread tools ever developed by early humans. As a weapon, it may be wielded with either one or two hands. It was used in virtually every conflict up until the modern era, where even to this day, it lives on in the form of a bayonet fixed onto the muzzle of a long gun.

Early humans progressively invented tools and techniques for trapping animals. The earliest spears were crafted from wood, with tips toughened by burning. By 15,000 BC, hunters employed wooden and bone spear-launchers to enhance force and distance. These devices were frequently adorned with carvings of creatures.

== Etymology ==
The word spear comes from the Old English spere, from the Proto-Germanic speri, from a Proto-Indo-European root *sper- "spear, pole".

== Origins ==
Spear manufacture and use is not confined to humans. It is also practiced by the western chimpanzee. Chimpanzees near Kédougou, Senegal have been observed to create spears by breaking straight limbs off trees, stripping them of their bark and side branches, and sharpening one end with their teeth. They then used the weapons to hunt galagos sleeping in hollows.

=== Prehistory ===
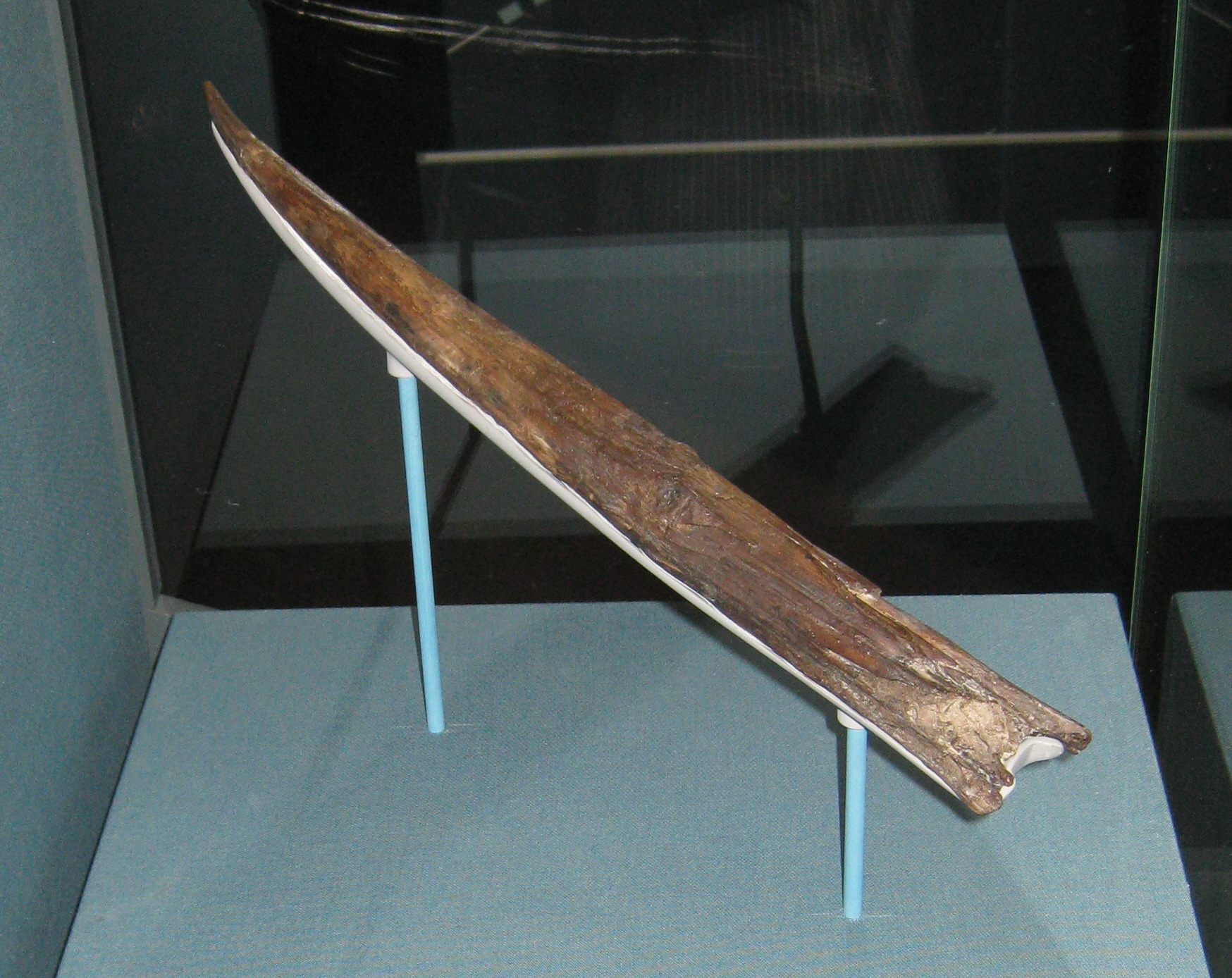
The Clacton Spear, a spear point from about 400,000 years ago, and the oldest known spear, Natural History Museum, London

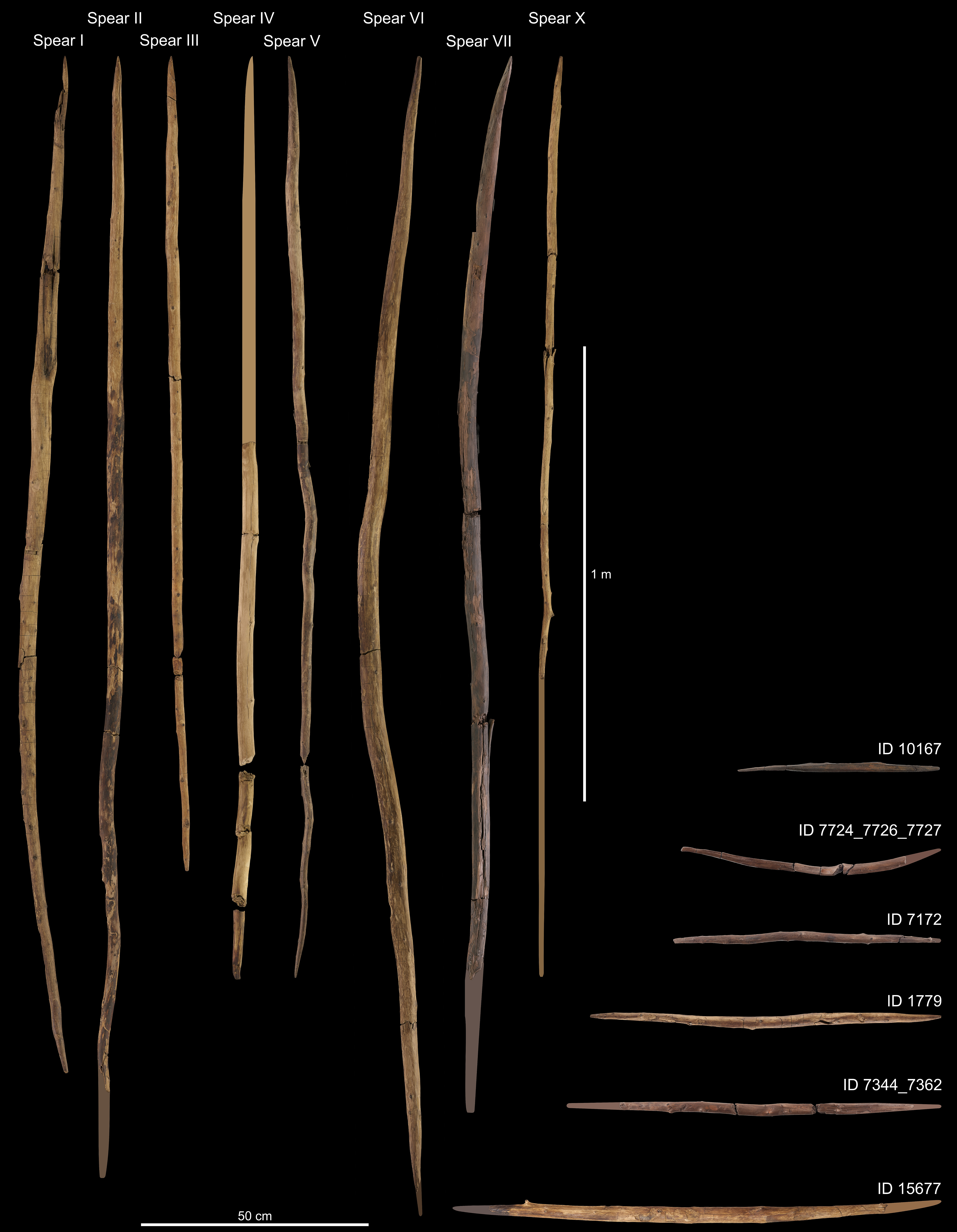
The Schöningen spears c. 300-200,000 years old, the oldest known complete wooden spears

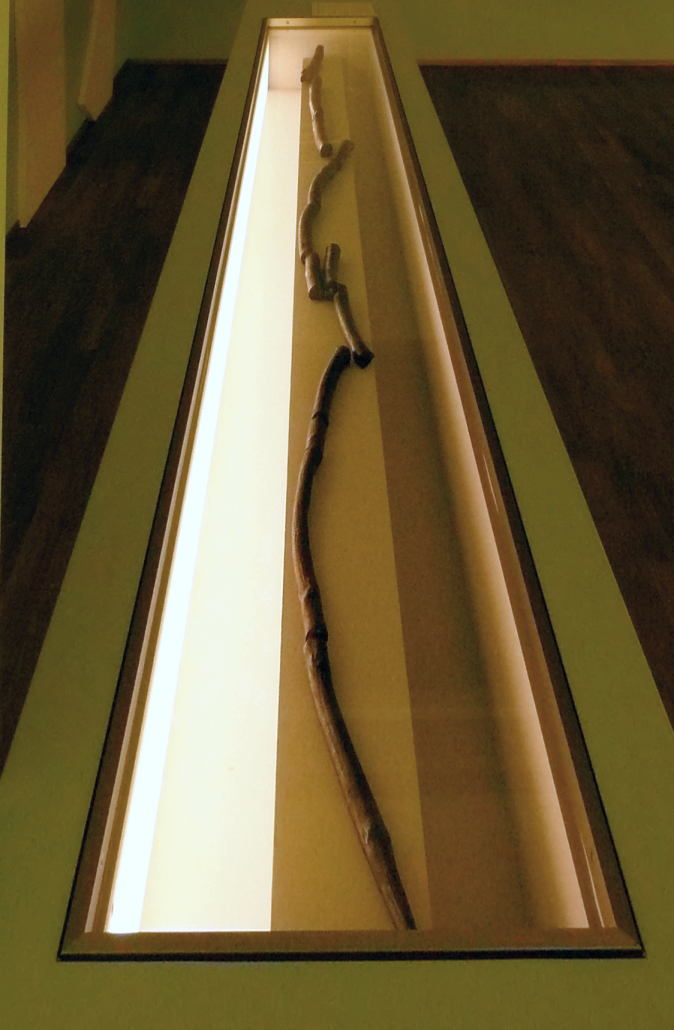
The Lehringen spear c. 120,000 years old, which was associated with an elephant skeleton

The Clacton Spear found in England and the Schöningen spears found in present-day Germany document that fully wooden spears have been used for hunting since at least 400,000 years ago, likely for horses in the case of Schöningen. The 120,000 year old Lehringen spear from Germany made by Neanderthals is associated with the butchered skeleton of a large straight-tusked elephant which it was presumably used to kill. A 2012 study from the site of Kathu Pan in South Africa suggests that hominids, possibly Homo heidelbergensis, may have developed the technology of hafted stone-tipped spears in Africa about 500,000 years ago. Wood does not preserve well, however, and Craig Stanford, a primatologist and professor of anthropology at the University of Southern California, has suggested that the discovery of spear use by chimpanzees means that early humans may have used wooden spears before this.

From circa 200,000 BC onwards, Middle Paleolithic humans began to make complex stone blades with flaked edges which were used as spear heads. These stone heads could be fixed to the spear shaft by gum or resin or by bindings made of animal sinew, leather strips or vegetable matter. During this period, a clear difference remained between spears designed to be thrown and those designed to be used in hand-to-hand combat. By the Magdalenian period (c. 15,000–9500 BC), spear-throwers similar to the later atlatl were in use.

== Military ==
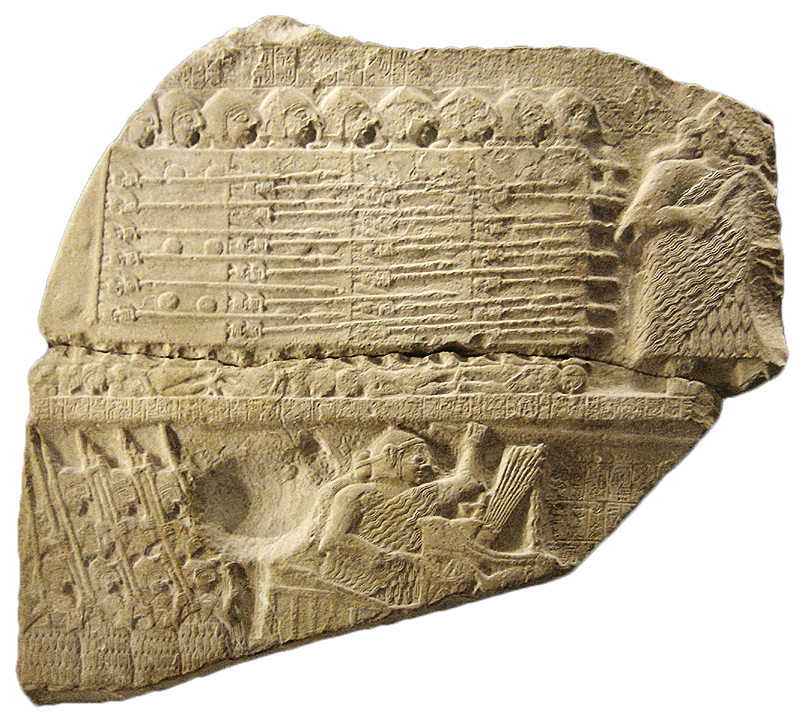
Sumerian spearmen advancing in close formation with large shields – Stele of the Vultures, c. 2450 BC

=== Europe ===
==== Classical antiquity ====
===== Ancient Greeks =====
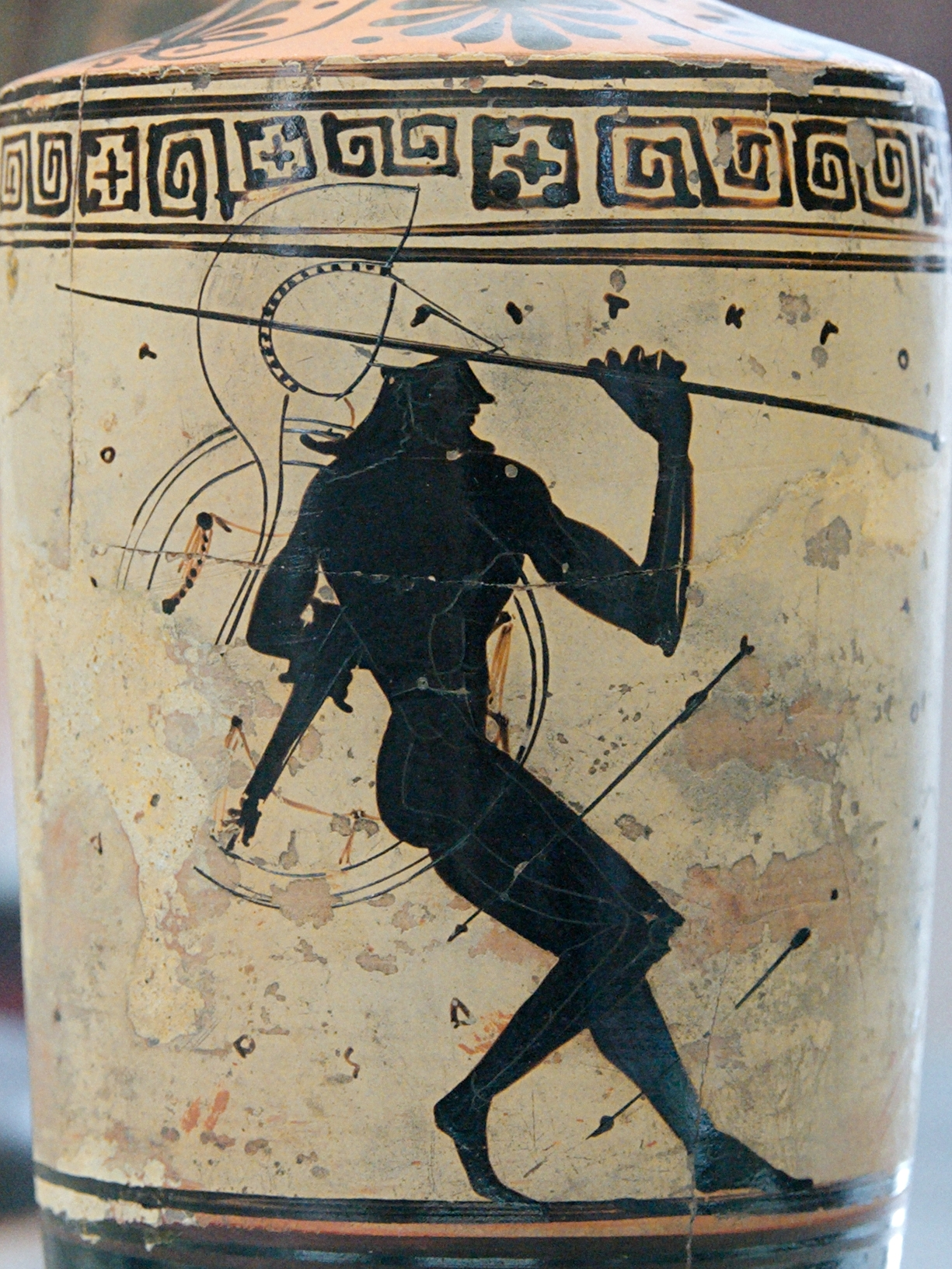
Athenian warrior wielding a spear in battle

The spear is the main weapon of the warriors of Homer's Iliad. The use of both a single thrusting spear and two throwing spears are mentioned. It has been suggested that two styles of combat are being described; an early style, with thrusting spears, dating to the Mycenaean period in which the Iliad is set, and, anachronistically, a later style, with throwing spears, from Homer's own Archaic period.

In the 7th century BC, the Greeks evolved a new close-order infantry formation, the phalanx. The key to this formation was the hoplite, who was equipped with a large, circular, bronze-faced shield (aspis) and a 210–270 cm (7–9 ft) spear with an iron head and bronze butt-spike (doru). The hoplite phalanx dominated warfare among the Greek City States from the 7th into the 4th century BC.

The 4th century saw major changes. One was the greater use of peltasts, light infantry armed with spear and javelins. The other was the development of the sarissa, a two-handed pike 550 cm (18 ft) in length, by the Macedonians under Phillip of Macedon and Alexander the Great. The pike phalanx, supported by peltasts and cavalry, became the dominant mode of warfare among the Greeks from the late 4th century onward until Greek military systems were supplanted by the Roman legions.

===== Ancient Romans =====
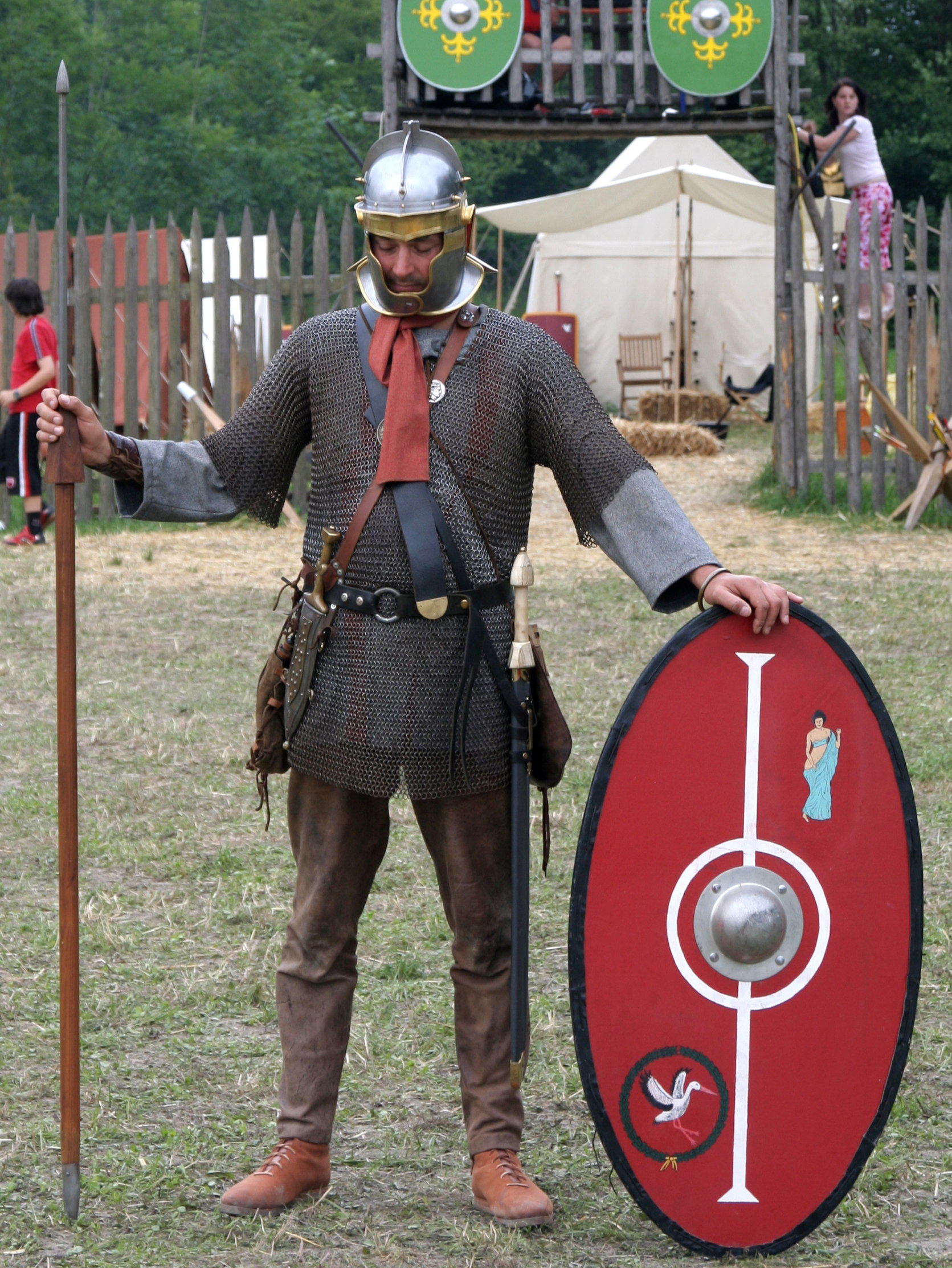
Re-enactor outfitted as a Late Roman legionary carrying a pilum

In the pre-Marian Roman armies, the first two lines of battle, the hastati and principes, often fought with a sword called a gladius and pila, heavy javelins that were specifically designed to be thrown at an enemy to pierce and foul a target's shield. Originally, the principes were armed with a thrusting spear called a hasta, but these gradually fell out of use, eventually being replaced by the gladius. The third line, the triarii, continued to use the hasta.

From the late 2nd century BC, all legionaries were equipped with the pilum. The pilum continued to be the standard legionary spear until the end of the 2nd century AD. Auxilia, however, were equipped with a simple hasta and, perhaps, javelins or darts. During the 3rd century AD, although the pilum continued to be used, legionaries usually were equipped with other forms of throwing and thrusting spear, similar to auxilia of the previous century. By the 4th century, the pilum had effectively disappeared from common use.

In the late period of the Roman Empire, the spear became more often used because of its anti-cavalry capacities as the barbarian invasions were often conducted by people with a developed culture of cavalry in warfare.

==== Medieval period ====
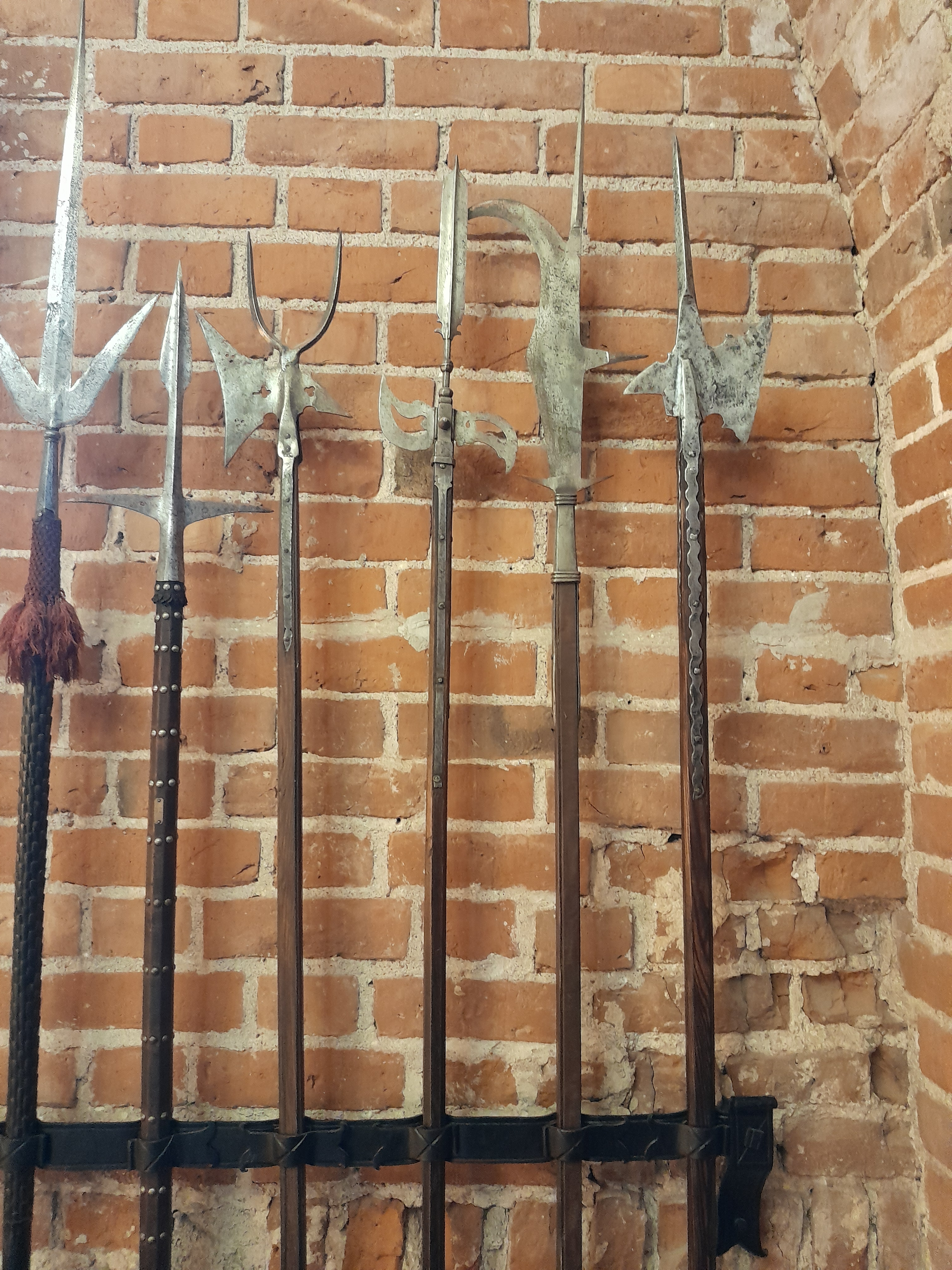
Medieval polearms exhibited in Trakai Island Castle, Lithuania. Polearms such as these came to replace the spear from the 14th century onwards.

After the fall of the Western Roman Empire, the spear and shield continued to be used by nearly all Western European cultures. Since a medieval spear required only a small amount of steel along the sharpened edges (most of the spear-tip was wrought iron), it was an economical weapon. Quick to manufacture, and needing less smithing skill than a sword, it remained the main weapon of the common soldier. The Vikings, for instance, although often portrayed with an axe, sword, or lance in hand, were armed mostly with spears, as were their Anglo-Saxon, Irish, or continental contemporaries. Spears eventually evolved into lances; this is where the lance depiction comes from. With a good majority of Medieval weapons being spears they became integrated into many war tactics. Spears were very commonly used while providing a defensive block. When men on horses tried to get by these blocks, they would often be killed by the spears that could poke through the shield walls. Spears became more common than swords and axes because of how cheap, long, and fast spears were made.

===== Infantry =====
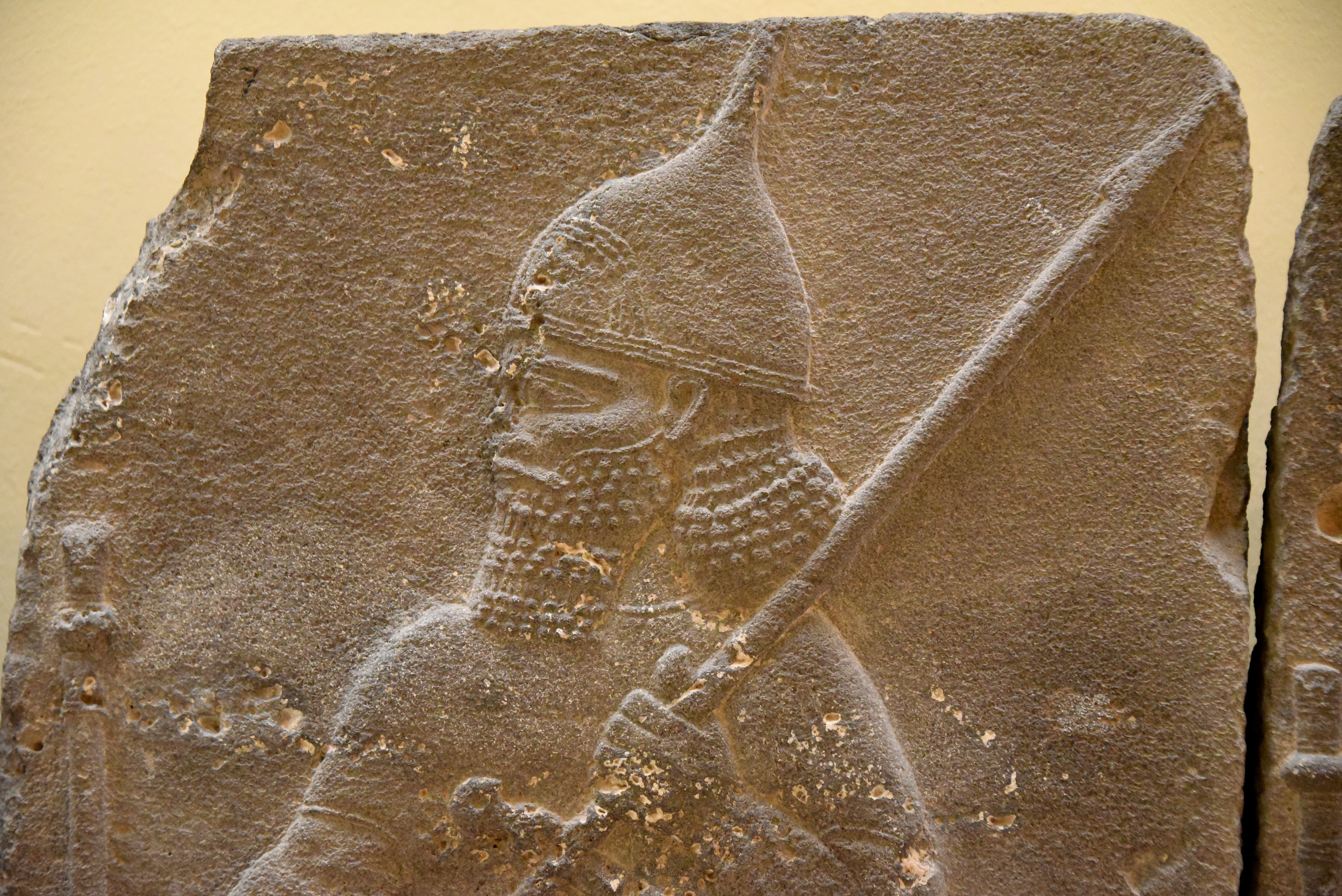
Assyrian soldier holding a spear and wearing a helmet. Detail of a basalt relief from the palace of Tiglath-pileser III at Hadatu, Syria. 744–727 BC. Ancient Orient Museum, Istanbul

Broadly speaking, spears were either designed to be used in melee, or to be thrown. Within this simple classification, there was a remarkable range of types. For example, M. J. Swanton identified thirty different spearhead categories and sub-categories in early Saxon England. Most medieval spearheads were generally leaf-shaped. Notable types of early medieval spears include the angon, a throwing spear with a long head similar to the Roman pilum, used by the Franks and Anglo-Saxons, and the winged (or lugged) spear, which had two prominent wings at the base of the spearhead, either to prevent the spear penetrating too far into an enemy or to aid in spear fencing. Originally a Frankish weapon, the winged spear also was popular with the Vikings. It would become the ancestor of later medieval polearms, such as the partisan and spetum.

The thrusting spear also has the advantage of reach, being considerably longer than other weapon types. Exact spear lengths are hard to deduce as few spear shafts survive archaeologically, but 180–240 cm (6–8 ft) would seem to have been the average length. Some nations were noted for their long spears, including the Scots and the Flemish. Spears usually were used in tightly ordered formations, such as the shield wall or the schiltron. To resist cavalry, spear shafts could be planted against the ground. William Wallace drew up his schiltrons in a circle at the Battle of Falkirk in 1298 to deter charging cavalry; this was a widespread tactic sometimes known as the "crown" formation. Thomas Randolph, 1st Earl of Moray used a circular schiltron on the first day of the Battle of Bannockburn. However, the rectangular schiltron was much more common and was used by King Robert the Bruce on the second day of the Battle of Bannockburn and in the Battle of Old Byland when he defeated English armies.

Throwing spears became rarer as the Middle Ages drew on, but survived in the hands of specialists such as the Catalan Almogavars. They were commonly used in Ireland until the end of the 16th century.

Spears began to lose fashion among the infantry during the 14th century, being replaced by polearms that combined the thrusting properties of the spear with the cutting properties of the axe, such as the halberd. This was concurrent with the rise of plate armour, against which spears were broadly ineffective, and which reduced the need for a soldier to carry a shield, thus allowing them to use both hands to fight with a heavier weapon. Where spears were retained they grew in length, eventually evolving into pikes, which would be a dominant infantry weapon in the 16th and 17th centuries.

===== Cavalry =====
Cavalry spears were originally the same as infantry spears and were often used with two hands or held with one hand overhead. In the 12th century, after the adoption of stirrups and a high-cantled saddle, the spear became a decidedly more powerful weapon. A mounted knight would secure the lance by holding it with one hand and tucking it under the armpit (the couched lance technique) In combination with a lance rest, this allowed all the momentum of the horse and knight to be focused on the weapon's tip, whilst still retaining accuracy and control. This use of the spear spurred the development of the lance as a distinct weapon that was perfected in the medieval sport of jousting.

In the 14th century, tactical developments meant that knights and men-at-arms often fought on foot. This led to the practice of shortening the lance to about 150 cm (5 ft) to make it more manageable. As dismounting became commonplace, specialist polearms such as the pollaxe were adopted by knights and this practice ceased.

==== Introduction of gunpowder ====
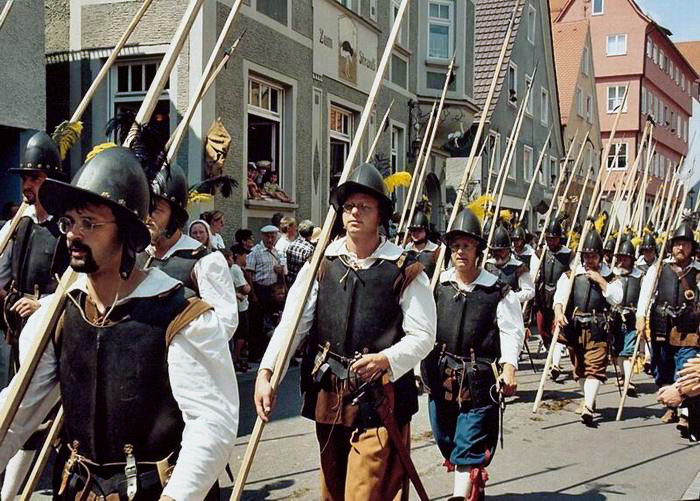
German reenactors of pikemen

The development of both the long, two-handed pike and gunpowder firearms in Renaissance Europe saw an ever-increasing focus on integrated infantry tactics. Those infantry not armed with these weapons carried variations on the polearm, including the halberd and the bill. At the start of the Renaissance, cavalry remained predominantly lance-armed; gendarmes with the heavy knightly lance and lighter cavalry with a variety of lighter lances. By the 1540s, however, pistol-armed cavalry called reiters were beginning to make their mark. Cavalry armed with pistols and other lighter firearms, along with a sword, had virtually replaced lance armed cavalry in Western Europe by the beginning of the 17th century.

The pike became obsolete with the development of the bayonet in the latter half of the 17th century. By attaching a thrusting blade to the end of a gun this allowed it to also act as a spear, thus allowing every soldier to fill the role of a pikeman.

The last usage of the spear proper in European standing armies was the half-pike or spontoon, a shortened version of the pike carried by officers of various ranks. While originally a weapon, this came to be seen more as a badge of office, or leading staff by which troops were directed. The half-pike, sometimes known as a boarding pike, was also used as a weapon on board ships until the late 19th century.

Spears spear-like weapons continued in occasional usage by rebellions and occasionally by poorly equipped regular army units. Examples of this can be seen in Polish scythemen, or in the 'pikes' used in John Brown's raid on Harpers Ferry.

=== Middle East ===
==== Modern era ====
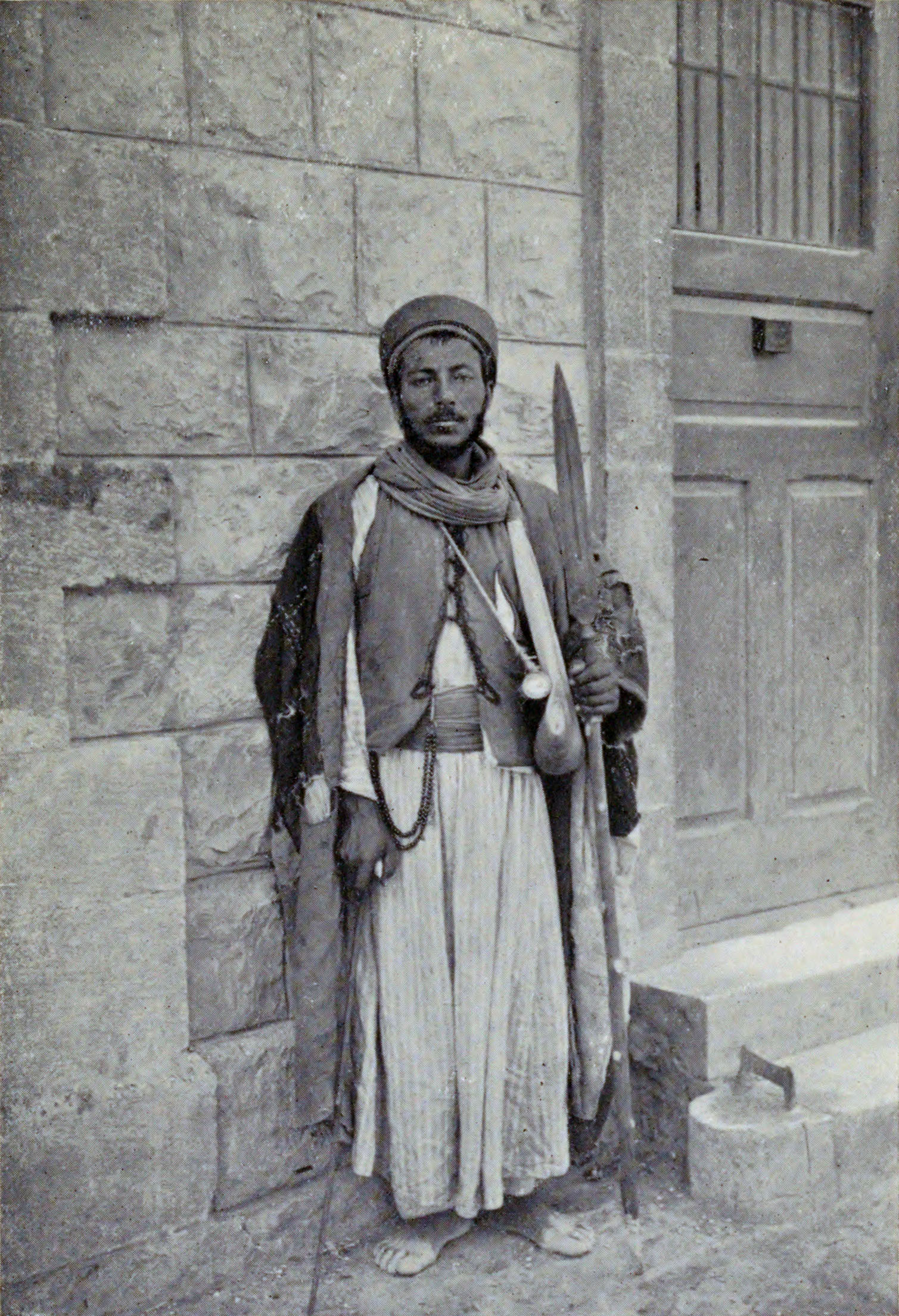
An Arab Sufi ascetic carrying a short assegai in 1913.

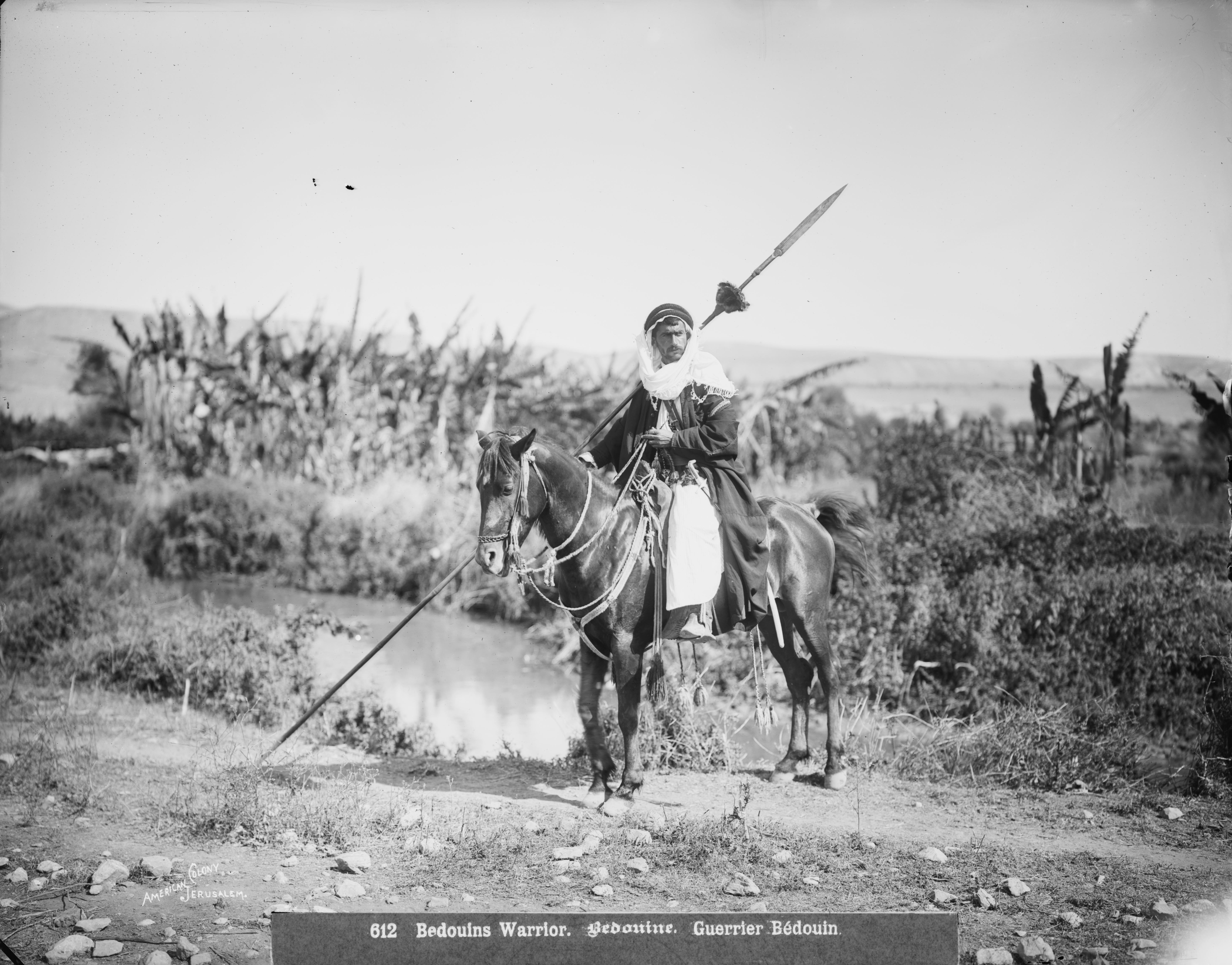
A Bedouin Arab warrior carrying a long hunting az-zaġāyah c. 1914.

Muslim warriors used a spear that was called an az-zaġāyah. Berbers pronounced it zaġāya, but the English term, derived from the Old French via Berber, is "assegai". It is a polearm used for throwing or hurling, usually a light spear or javelin made of hard wood and pointed with a forged iron tip. The az-zaġāyah played an important role during the Islamic conquest as well as during later periods, well into the 20th century. A longer pole az-zaġāyah was being used as a hunting weapon from horseback. The az-zaġāyah was widely used. It existed in various forms in areas stretching from Southern Africa to the Indian subcontinent, although these places already had their own variants of the spear. This javelin was the weapon of choice during the Fulani jihad as well as during the Mahdist War in Sudan. It is still being used by certain wandering Sufi ascetics (Derwishes).

=== Asia ===
==== China ====
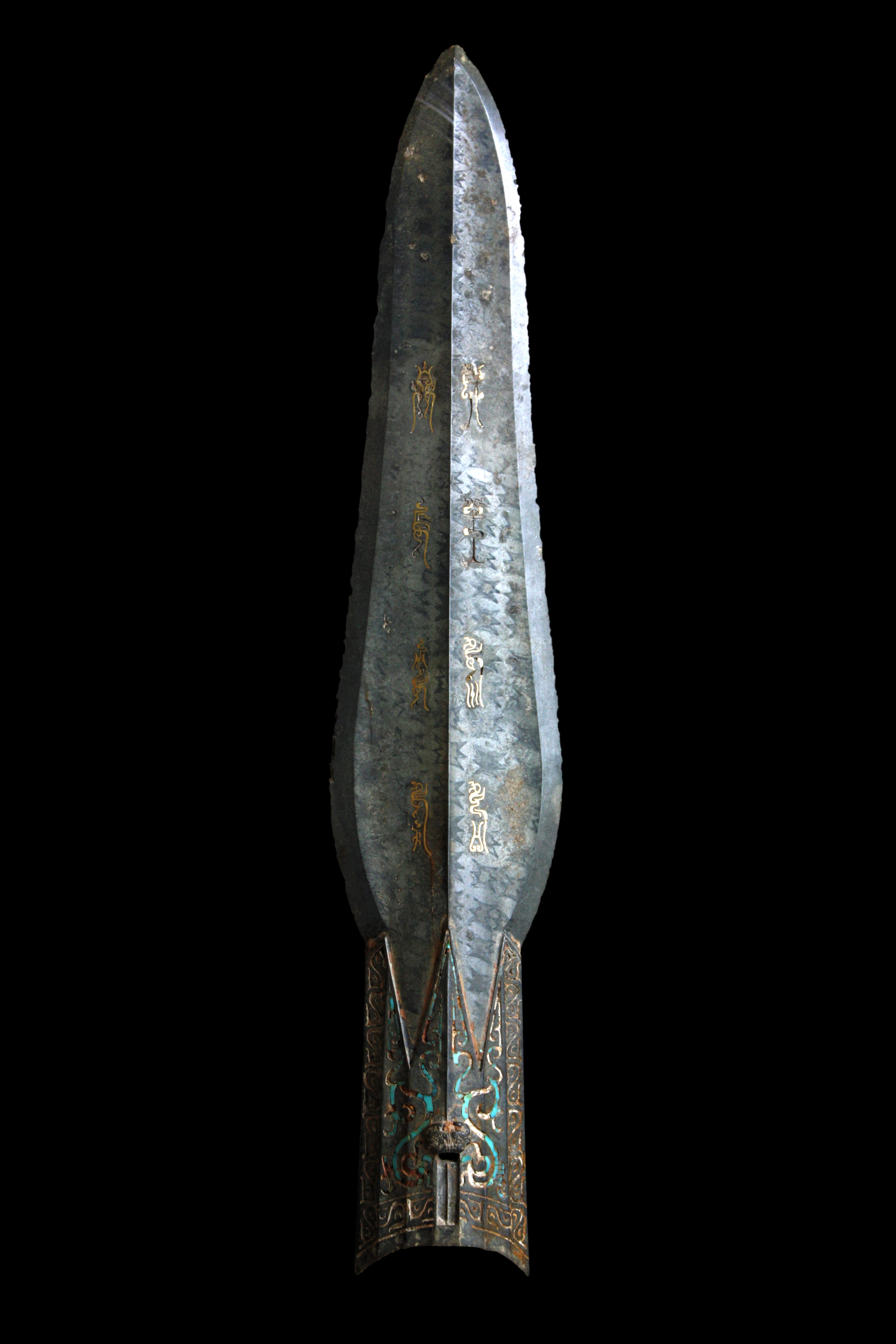
Spear with inscription, Zhou dynasty

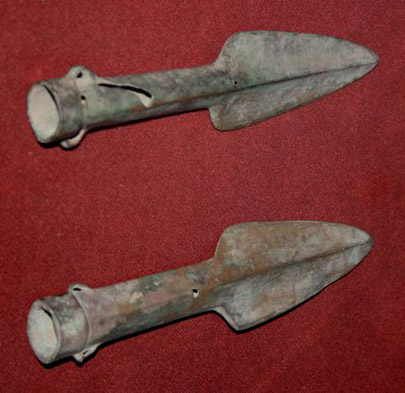
Shang dynasty spear heads

In the Chinese martial arts, the Chinese spear or qiang (槍) is popularly known as the "king of weapons". The spear is listed as one of the Four Weapons, alongside the gun (staff), the dao (single-edged blade, often similar to a sabre), and the jian (double-edged blade, a form of sword).

Spears were used first as hunting weapons amongst the ancient Chinese. They became popular as infantry weapons during the Warring States and Qin era, when spearmen were used as especially highly disciplined soldiers in organized group attacks. When used in formation fighting, spearmen would line up their large rectangular or circular shields in a shieldwall manner. The Qin also employed long spears (more akin to a pike) in formations similar to Swiss pikemen in order to ward off cavalry. The Han Empire would use similar tactics as its Qin predecessors. Halberds, polearms, and dagger axes were also common weapons during this time.

Spears were also common weaponry for Warring States, Qin, and Han era cavalry units. During these eras, the spear would develop into a longer lance-like weapon used for cavalry charges.

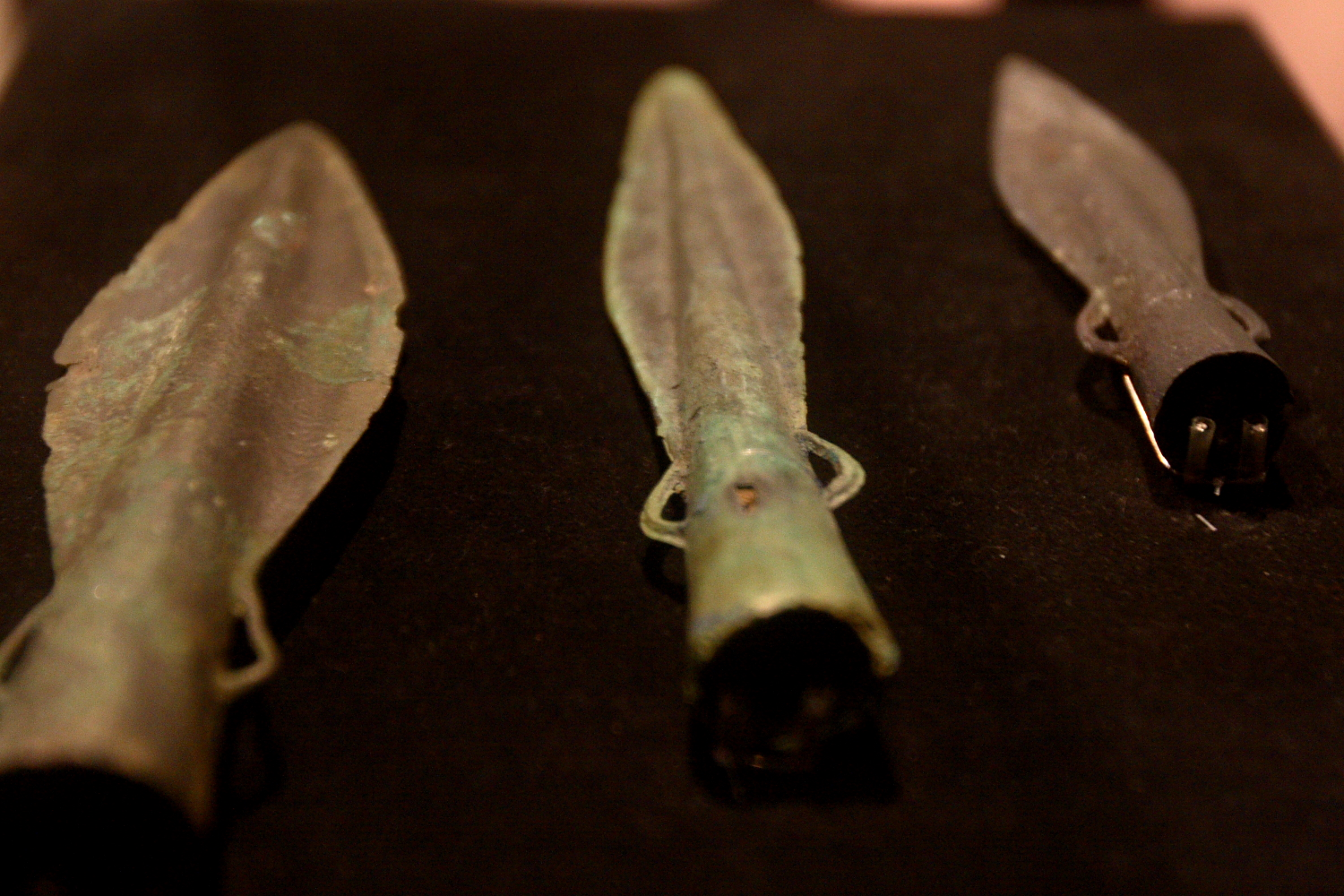
Bronze spears, notice the ears on the side of the socket.

There are many words in Chinese that would be classified as a spear in English. The Mao (矛) is the predecessor of the Qiang. The first bronze Mao appeared in the Shang dynasty. This weapon was less prominent on the battlefield than the ge (dagger-axe). In some archaeological examples two tiny holes or ears can be found in the blade of the spearhead near the socket, these holes were presumably used to attach tassels, much like modern day wushu spears.

In the early Shang, the Mao appeared to have a relatively short shaft as well as a relatively narrow shaft as opposed to Mao in the later Shang and Western Zhou period. Some Mao from this era are heavily decorated as is evidenced by a Warring States period Mao from the Ba Shu area.

In the Han dynasty the Mao and the Ji (戟 Ji can be loosely defined as a halberd) rose to prominence in the military. Interesting to note is that the amount of iron Mao-heads found exceeds the number of bronze heads. By the end of the Han dynasty (Eastern Han) the process of replacement of the iron Mao had been completed and the bronze Mao had been rendered completely obsolete. After the Han dynasty toward the Sui and Tang dynasties the Mao used by cavalry were fitted with much longer shafts, as is mentioned above. During this era, the use of the Shuo (矟) was widespread among the footmen. The Shuo can be likened to a pike or simply a long spear.

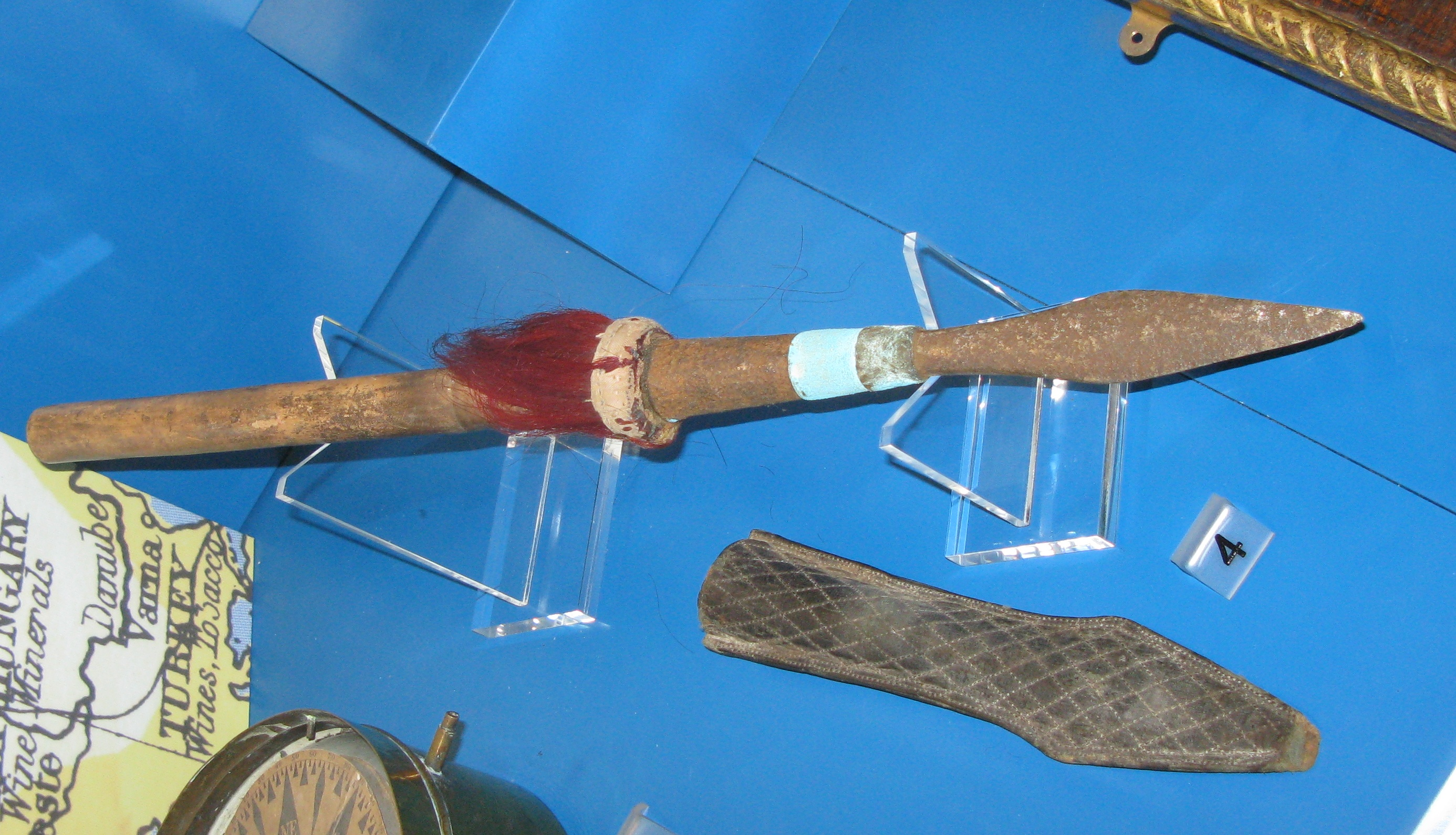
A later period qiang

After the Tang dynasty, the popularity of the Mao declined and was replaced by the Qiang (枪). The Tang dynasty divided the Qiang in four categories: "一曰漆枪， 二曰木枪， 三曰白杆枪， 四曰扑头枪。” Roughly translated the four categories are: Qi (a kind of wood) Spears, Wooden Spears, Bai Gan (A kind of wood) Spears and Pu Tou Qiang. The Qiang that were produced in the Song and Ming dynasties consisted of four major parts: Spearhead, Shaft, End Spike and Tassel. The types of Qiang that exist are many. Among the types there are cavalry Qiang that were the length of one zhang (approximately 320 cm or 10 ft), Litte-Flower Spears (Xiao Hua Qiang 小花枪) that are the length of one person and their arm extended above his head, double hooked spears, single hooked spears, ringed spears and many more.

There is some confusion as to how to distinguish the Qiang from the Mao, as they are obviously very similar. Some people say that a Mao is longer than a Qiang, others say that the main difference is between the stiffness of the shaft, where the Qiang would be flexible and the Mao would be stiff. Scholars seem to lean toward the latter explanation more than the former. Because of the difference in the construction of the Mao and the Qiang, the usage is also different, though there is no definitive answer as to what exactly the differences are between the Mao and the Qiang.

Despite their obsolence, spears remained in use with the Qing Army in the late 19th century: during the First Sino-Japanese War, 40% of Imperial soldiers didn't have rifles or even muskets. Spears and other melee weapons were also widely used by the Boxers during their eponymous rebellion.

During the Warlord Era, the army of warlord Sun Chuanfang had units armed only with spears to oppose Chiang Kai Shek's Northern Expedition as a stopgap measure until he could import more rifles. The Chinese Red Army guerillas often made use of spears against the Japanese occupation forces during the Second Sino-Japanese War, while several Japanese puppet government troops had to make do with bamboo spears. During the Chinese Civil War, both Communist and Nationalist forces made use of spears, the latter mostly due Chiang's refusal to supply local commanders with rifles to prevent potential rivals from raising well-armed militias and challenging his authority.

==== India ====
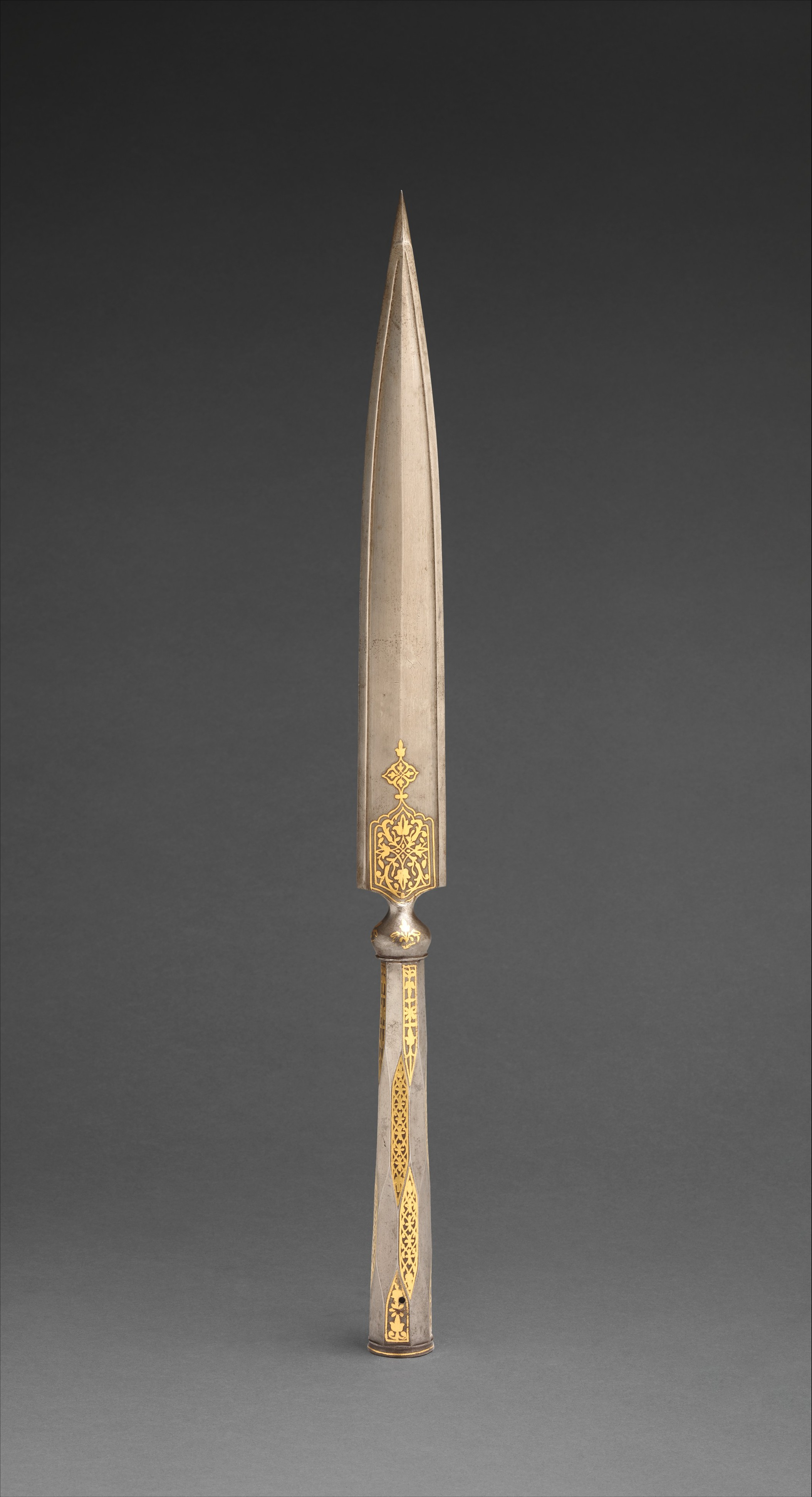
North Indian, spearhead and socket

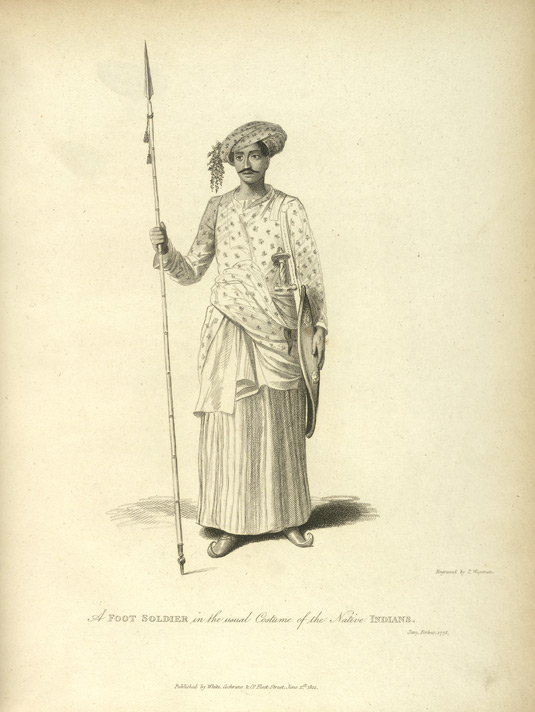
Engraving of a Maratha soldier with spear by James Forbes, 1813.

Spears are known as Bhala in Indian languages. Spears in the Indian society were used both in missile and non-missile form, both by cavalry and foot-soldiers. Mounted spear-fighting was practiced using with a 300 cm (10 ft), ball-tipped wooden lance called a bothati, the end of which was covered in dye so that hits may be confirmed. Spears were constructed from a variety of materials such as the sang made completely of steel, and the ballam which had a bamboo shaft.

The Arab presence in Sindh and the Mameluks of Delhi introduced the Middle Eastern javelin into India.

The Rajputs wielded a type of spear for infantrymen which had a club integrated into the spearhead, and a pointed butt end. Other spears had forked blades, several spear-points, and numerous other innovations. One particular spear unique to India was the vita or corded lance.

Used by the Maratha Army, it had a rope connecting the spear with the user's wrist, allowing the weapon to be thrown and pulled back. The Vel is a type of spear or lance, originated in Southern India, primarily used by Tamils.

Sangam poems frequently describe kings and chieftains in connection with the vēl (lance), using expressions for long, victorious, shining, numerous, and sharp lances. Vacek records these recurring descriptions, including occurrences of neṭu vēl (“long lance”) and veṉ vēl (“victorious lance”). In ancient Tamil literature, Purananuru - 312 states that “it is the duty of the blacksmith to forge and give him a spear”, referring to the production of spears for warriors.

Sikh Nihangs sometimes carry a spear even today. Spears were used in conflicts and training by armed paramilitary units such as the razakars of Nizams of Hyderabad State as late as the second half of the 20th century.

==== Japan ====
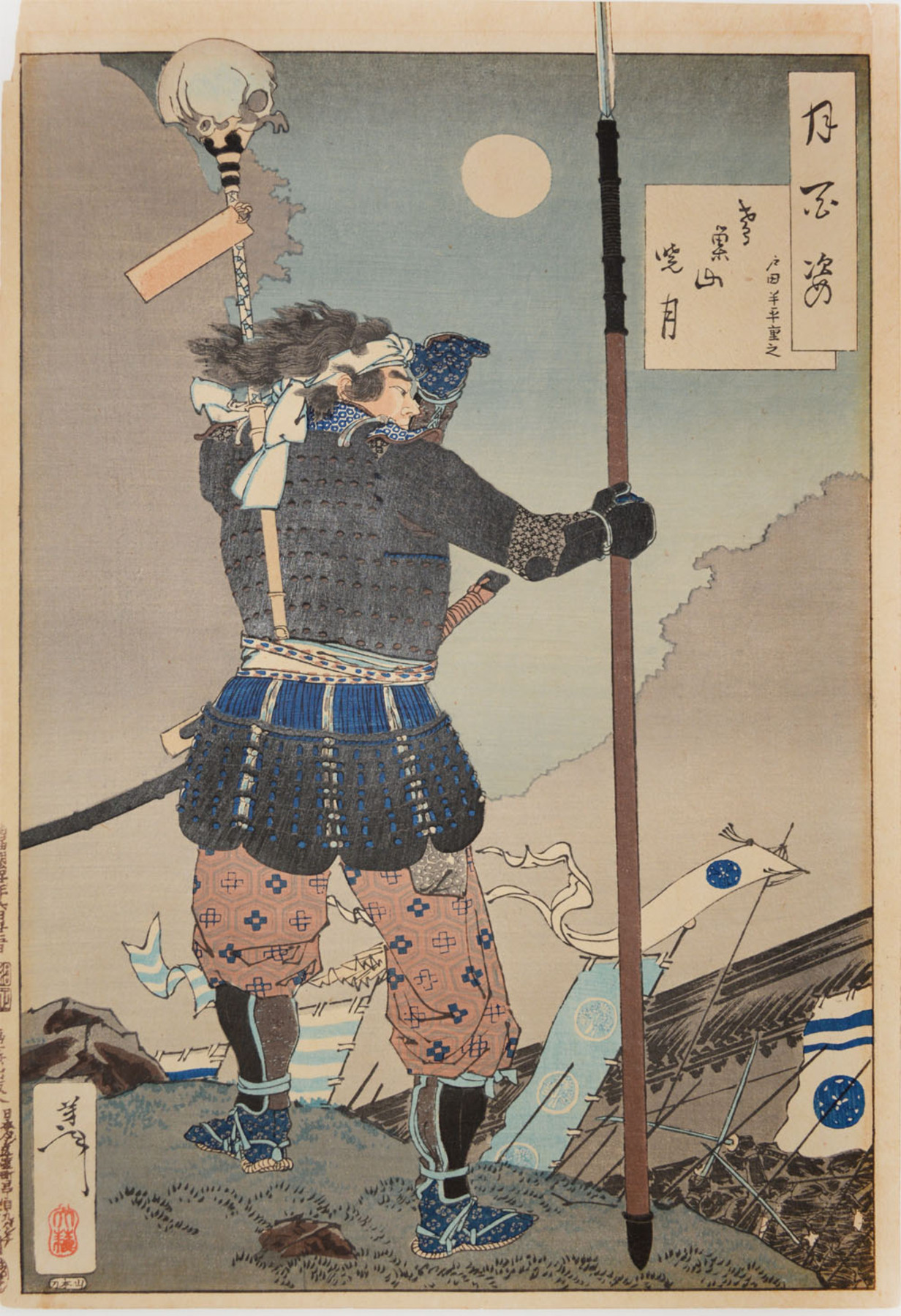
Ukiyo-e print of a samurai general holding a yari in his right hand

The hoko spear was used in ancient Japan sometime between the Yayoi period and the Heian period, but it became unpopular as early samurai often acted as horseback archers. Medieval Japan employed spears again for infantrymen to use, but it was not until the 11th century in that samurai began to prefer spears over bows. Several polearms were used in the Japanese theatres; the naginata was a glaive-like weapon with a long, curved blade popularly among the samurai and the Buddhist warrior-monks, often used against cavalry; the yari was a longer polearm, with a straight-bladed spearhead, which became the weapon of choice of both the samurai and the ashigaru (footmen) during the Warring States Era; the horseback samurai used shorter yari for his single-armed combat; on the other hand, ashigaru infantries used long yari (similar to European pikes) for their massed combat formation.

==== Philippines ====
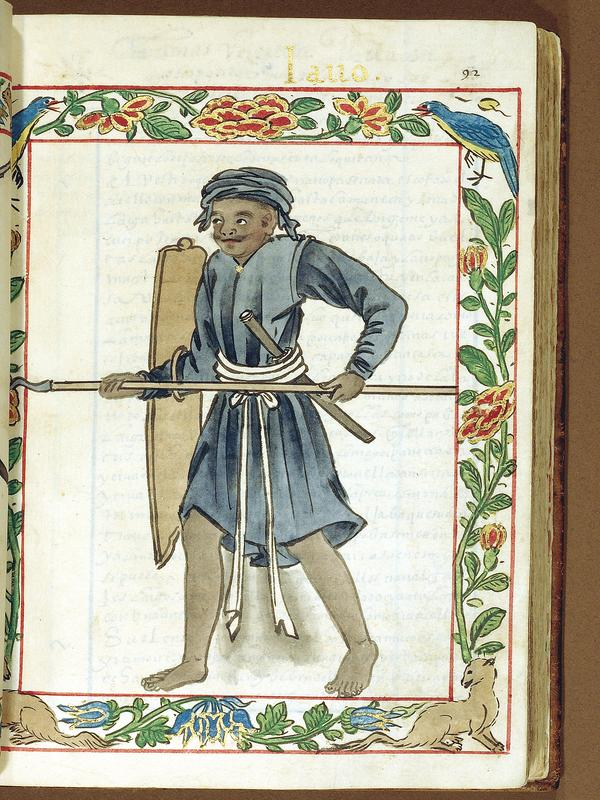
A Filipino warrior holding a Sibat (spear) in the Boxer Codex.

Filipino spears (sibat) were used as both a weapon and a tool throughout the Philippines. It is also called a bangkaw (after the Bankaw Revolt.), sumbling or palupad in the islands of Visayas and Mindanao. Sibat are typically made from rattan, either with a sharpened tip or a head made from metal. These heads may either be single-edged, double-edged or barbed. Styles vary according to function and origin. For example, a sibat designed for fishing may not be the same as those used for hunting.

The spear was used as the primary weapon in expeditions and battles against neighbouring island kingdoms and it became famous during the 1521 Battle of Mactan, where the chieftain Lapu Lapu of Cebu fought against Spanish forces led by Ferdinand Magellan who was subsequently killed.

=== Africa ===
==== South Africa ====
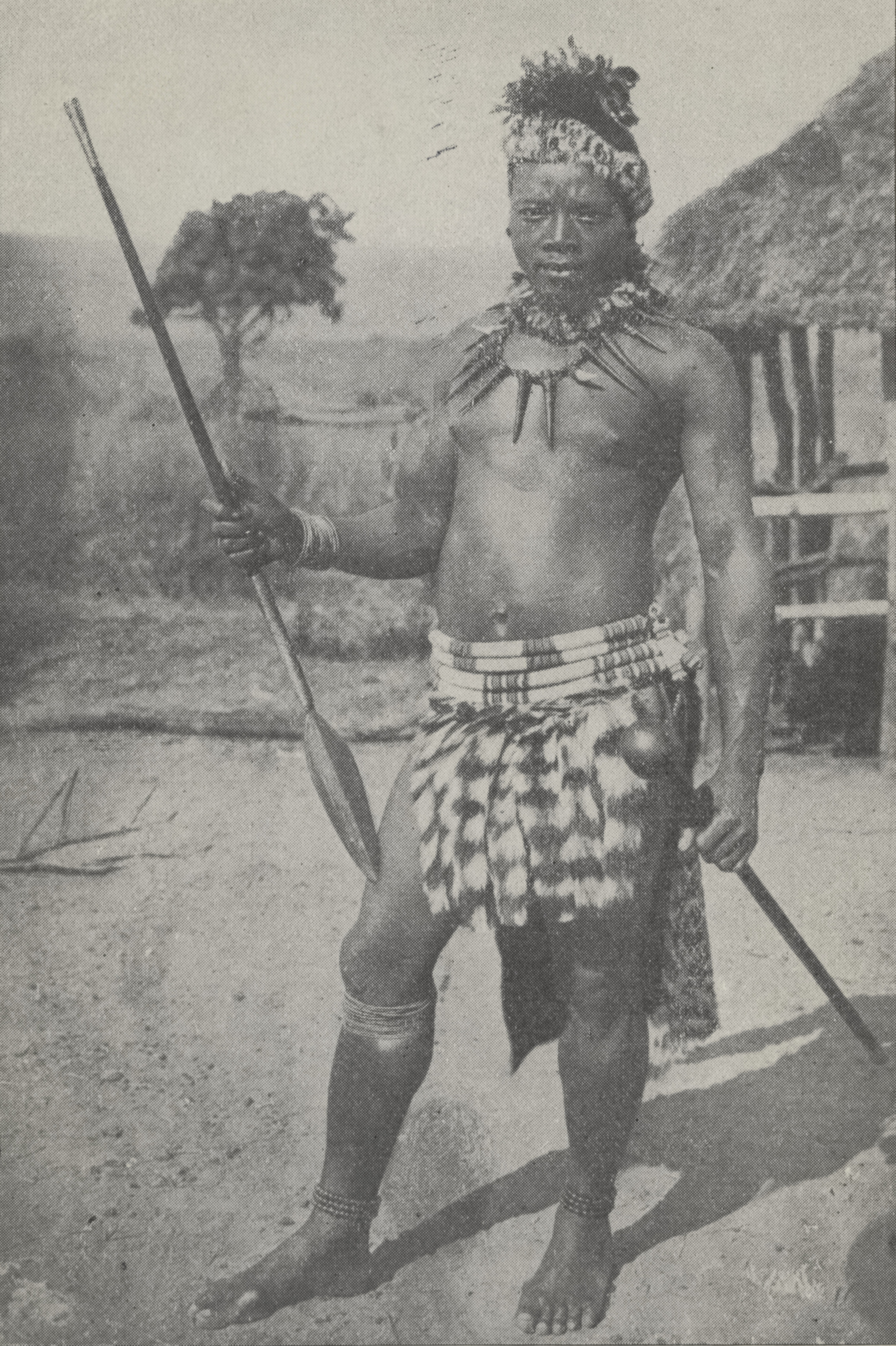
Zulu man with iklwa, 1917

The various types of the assegai (a light spear or javelin made of wood and pointed with iron or fire-hardened tip) were used throughout Africa and it was the most common weapon used before the introduction of firearms. The Zulu, Xhosa and other Nguni tribes of South Africa were renowned for their use of the assegai. Shaka of the Zulu invented a shorter stabbing spear with a 30 cm (1 ft) shaft and a larger, broader blade one foot (0.3m) long. This weapon is otherwise known as the iklwa or ixwa, after the sound that was heard as it was withdrawn from the victim's wound. The traditional spear was not abandoned, but was used to range attack enemy formations before closing in for close-quarters battle with the iklwa. This tactical combination originated during Shaka's military reforms. This weapon was typically used with one hand while the off hand held a cowhide shield for protection.

==== Egypt ====
Similar to most armies of their period, Ancient Egyptian forces were centered around the use of the spear. In battle, spearmen would be armed with a bronze-tipped spear (dja) and shield (ikem), which were used in elaborate formations much like Greek and Roman forces. Before the Hyksos invasion into Egypt, wooden spears were used, which were prone to splinter, but the influx of a new population brought innovations around bronze technology. Unlike other cultures who wielded spears at this time, the Egyptians did not treat their javelins (around 1 meter (or 3.3 feet) long) as disposable, using them both for thrusting and throwing. After the Hyksos invasion, during the New Kingdom, weapons were improved, with projectile weapons becoming more common, including the spear and javelin. During this time, projectile weapons, such as javelins could be used to take out the enemy before sending the infantry into the battlefield, as the enemy is weakened by the time the armed soldiers with spears and shields arrived.

=== The Americas ===
==== West Mexico and South America (Pre-Colombia) ====
As advanced metallurgy was largely unknown in pre-Columbian America outside of Western Mexico and South America, most weapons in Meso-America were made of wood or obsidian. This did not mean that they were less lethal, as obsidian may be sharpened to become many times sharper than steel. Meso-American spears varied greatly in shape and size. While the Aztecs preferred the sword-like macuahuitl clubs for fighting, the advantage of a far-reaching thrusting weapon was recognised, and a large portion of the army would carry the tepoztopilli into battle. The tepoztopilli was a polearm, and to judge from depictions in various Aztec codices, it was roughly the height of a man, with a broad wooden head about twice the length of the users' palm or shorter, edged with razor-sharp obsidian blades which were deeply set in grooves carved into the head, and cemented in place with bitumen or plant resin as an adhesive. The tepoztopilli was able both to thrust and slash effectively.

Throwing spears also were used extensively in Meso-American warfare, usually with the help of an atlatl. Throwing spears were typically shorter and more stream-lined than the tepoztopilli, and some had obsidian edges for greater penetration.

==== Native Americans ====
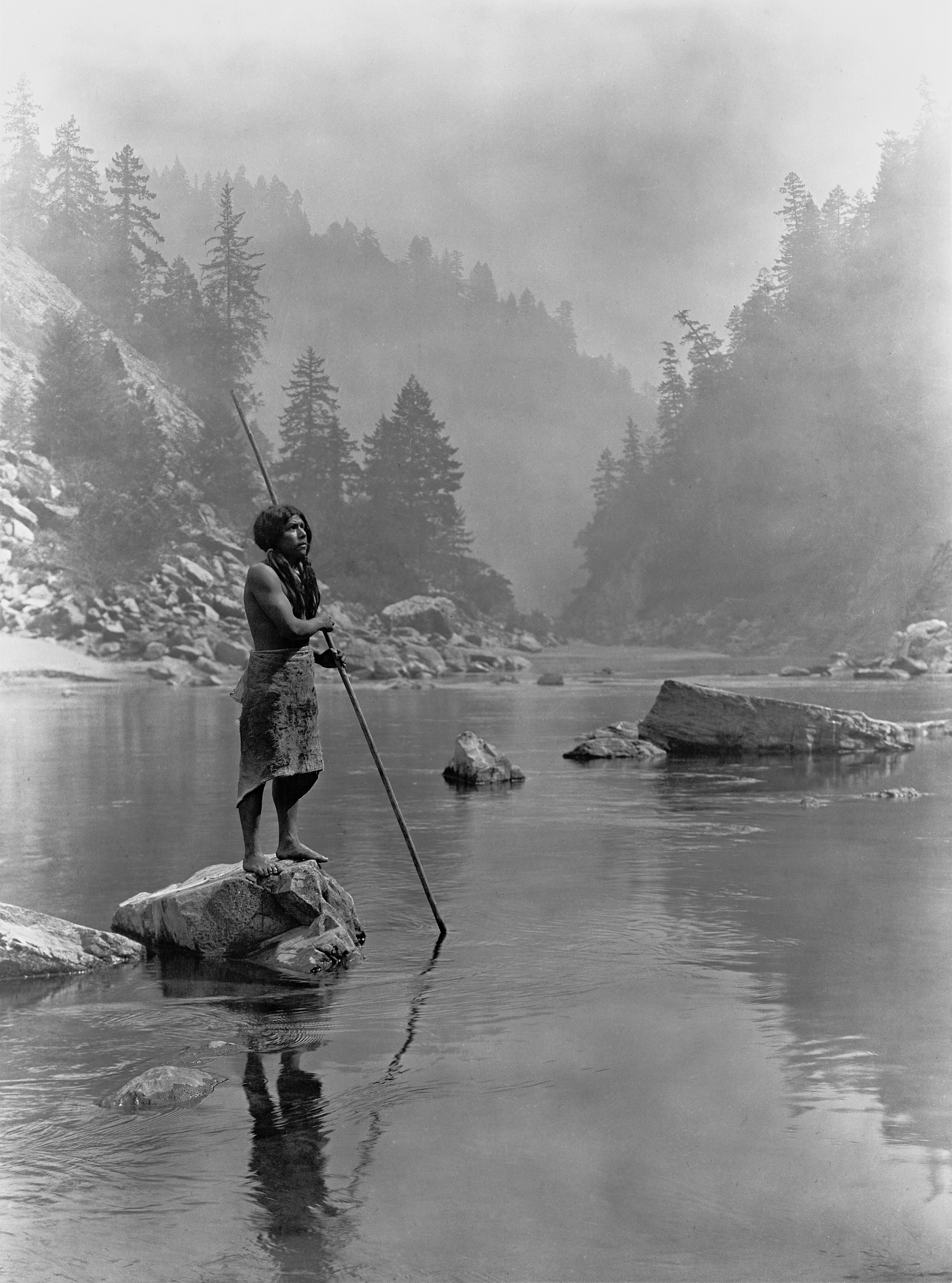
A photograph of a Hupa native American man with his spear – by Edward Sheriff Curtis, 1923

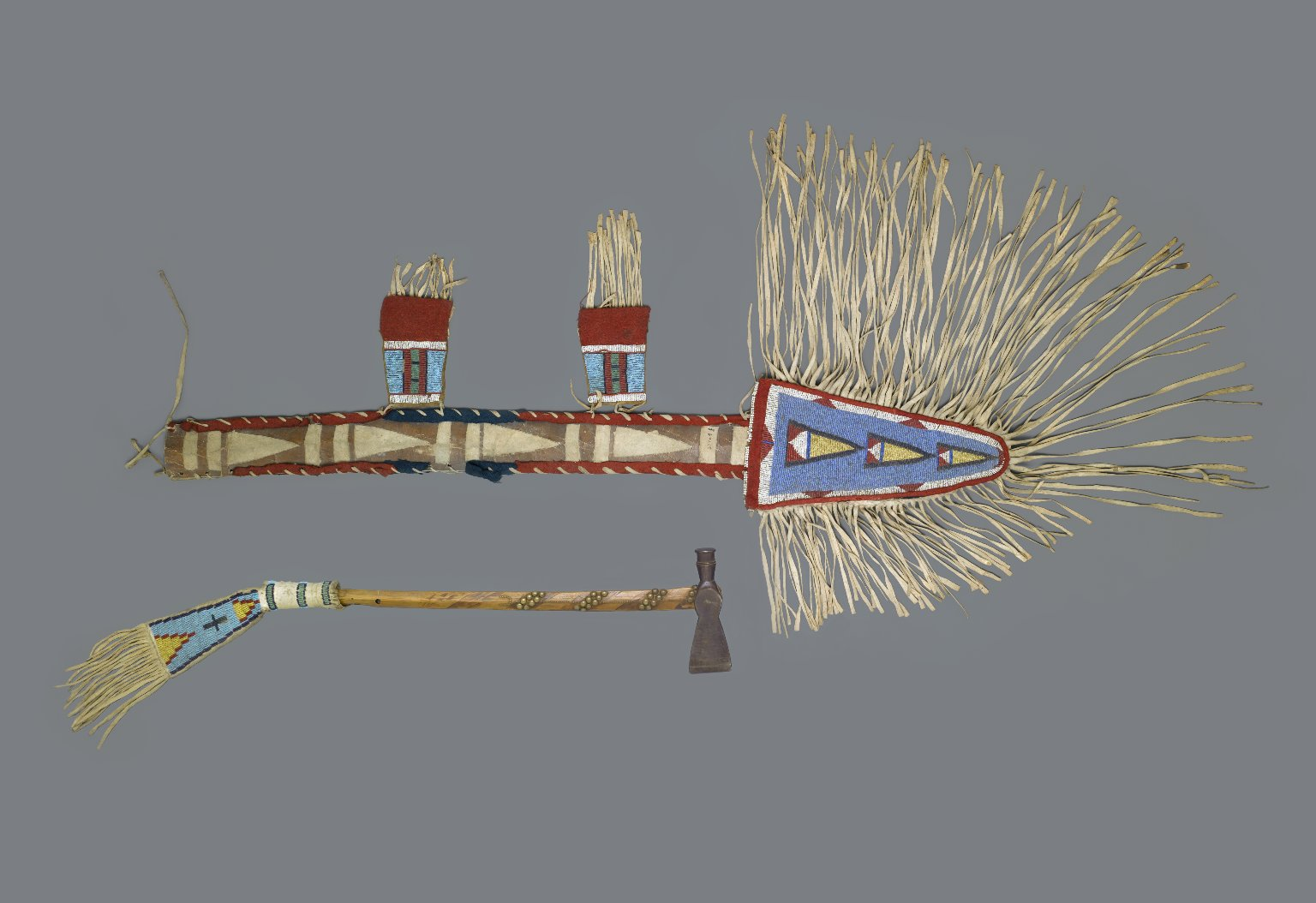
Spear Case, Crow (Native American), late 19th century, Brooklyn Museum

Typically, most spears made by Native Americans were created from materials surrounding their communities. Usually, the shaft of the spear was made with a wooden stick while the head of the spear was fashioned from arrowheads, pieces of metal such as copper, or a bone that had been sharpened. Spears were a preferred weapon by many since it was inexpensive to create, could more easily be taught to others, and could be made quickly and in large quantities.

Native Americans used the buffalo pound method to kill buffalo, which required a hunter to dress as a buffalo and lure one into a ravine where other hunters were hiding. Once the buffalo appeared, the other hunters would kill him with spears. A variation of this technique, called the buffalo jump, was when a runner would lead the animals towards a cliff. As the buffalo got close to the cliff, other members of the tribe would jump out from behind rocks or trees and scare the buffalo over the cliff. Other hunters would be waiting at the bottom of the cliff to spear the animal to death.

== Hunting ==
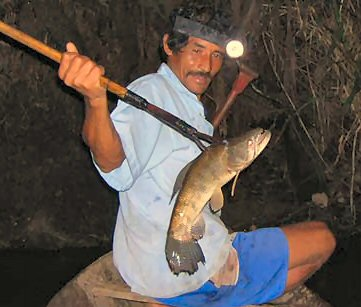
Peruvian fisherman spearfishing with a multi-pronged spear

One of the earliest forms of killing prey for humans, hunting game with a spear and spear fishing continues to this day as both a means of catching food and as a cultural activity. Some of the most common prey for early humans were megafauna such as mammoths which were hunted with various kinds of spear. One theory for the Quaternary extinction event was that most of these animals were hunted to extinction by humans with spears. Even after the invention of other hunting weapons such as the bow and sling, the spear continued to be used, either as a projectile weapon or used by hand, such as in bear hunting and boar hunting.

=== Types ===
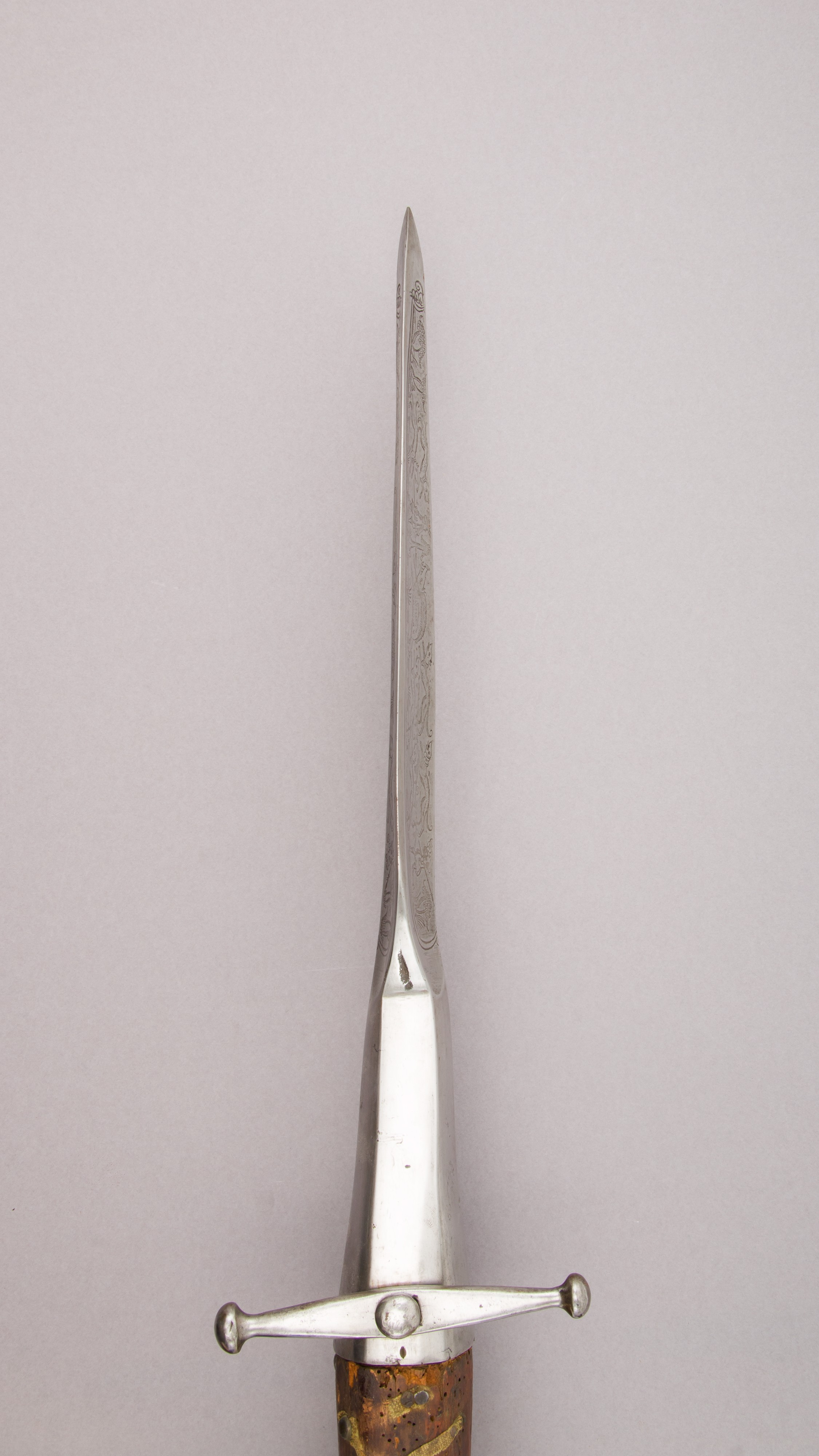
A boar-spear with a bar

- Barred spears: A barred spear has a crossbar beneath the blade, to prevent too deep a penetration of the spear into an animal. The bar may be forged as part of the spearhead or may be more loosely tied by means of loops below the blade. Barred spears are known from the Bronze Age, but the first historical record of their use in Europe is found in the writings of Xenophon in the 5th century BC. Examples also are shown in Roman art. In the Middle Ages, a winged or lugged war-spear was developed (see above), but the later Middle Ages saw the development of specialised types, such as the boar-spear and the bear-spear. The boar-spear could be used both on foot or horseback.
- Javelin
- Harpoon
- Trident

=== Modern revival ===
Spear hunting fell out of favor in most of Europe in the 18th century, but continued in Germany, enjoying a revival in the 1930s. Spear hunting is still practiced in the United States. Animals taken are primarily wild boar and deer, although trophy animals as large as Cape Buffalo have been hunted with spears. Alligators are hunted in Florida with a type of harpoon.

In underwater settings, the practice of sport fishing with spearguns is also quite prominent. The invention of the speargun is attributed to either Alec Kramarenko in the mid-1930s or Georges Beuchat in 1947.

== Gymnastics ==
One of the gymnastic exercises performed by the ancient Greeks was spear-throwing (ἀκυντισμός, akyntismós).

== In myth and legend ==
=== Symbolism ===
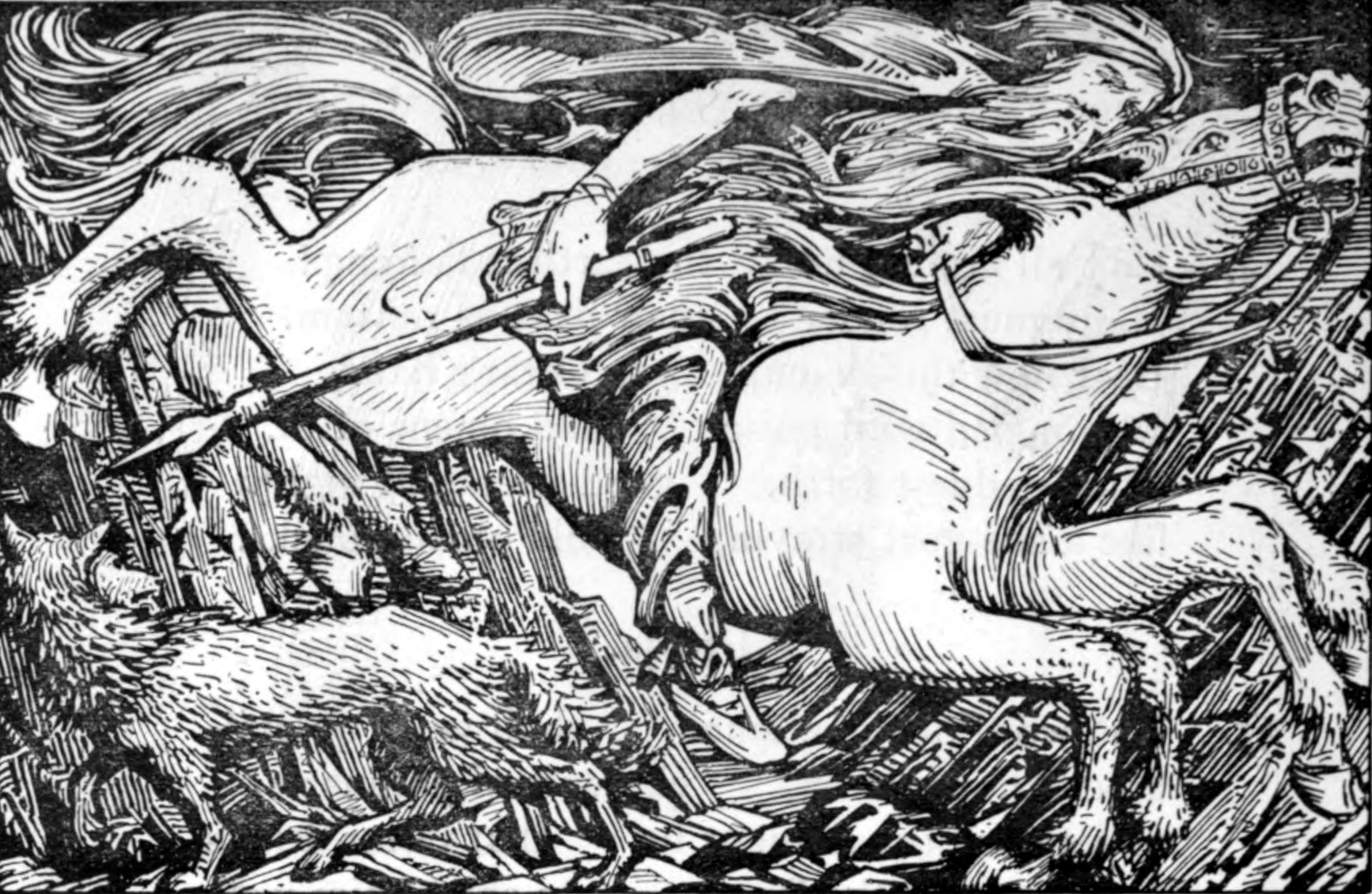
The Norse god Odin, carrying the spear Gungnir on his ride to Hel

Like many weapons, a spear may also be a symbol of power.

The Celts would symbolically destroy a dead warrior's spear either to prevent its use by another or as a sacrificial offering.

In classical Greek mythology Zeus' bolts of lightning may be interpreted as a symbolic spear. Some would carry that interpretation to the spear that frequently is associated with Athena, interpreting her spear as a symbolic connection to some of Zeus' power beyond the Aegis once he rose to replacing other deities in the pantheon. Athena was depicted with a spear prior to that change in myths, however. Chiron's wedding-gift to Peleus when he married the nymph Thetis in classical Greek mythology, was an ashen spear as the nature of ashwood with its straight grain made it an ideal choice of wood for a spear.

The Romans and their early enemies would force prisoners to walk underneath a 'yoke of spears', which humiliated them. The yoke would consist of three spears, two upright with a third tied between them at a height which made the prisoners stoop. It has been suggested that the arrangement has a magical origin, a way to trap evil spirits.

In Norse mythology, the god Odin's spear (named Gungnir) was made by the sons of Ivaldi. It had the special property that it never missed its mark. During the War with the Vanir, Odin symbolically threw Gungnir into the Vanir host. This practice of symbolically casting a spear into the enemy ranks at the start of a fight was sometimes used in historic clashes, to seek Odin's support in the coming battle. In Wagner's opera Siegfried, the haft of Gungnir is said to be from the "World-Tree" Yggdrasil.

Other spears of religious significance are the Holy Lance and the Lúin of Celtchar, believed by some to have vast mystical powers.

Sir James George Frazer in The Golden Bough noted the phallic nature of the spear and suggested that in the Arthurian legends the spear or lance functioned as a symbol of male fertility, paired with the Grail (as a symbol of female fertility).

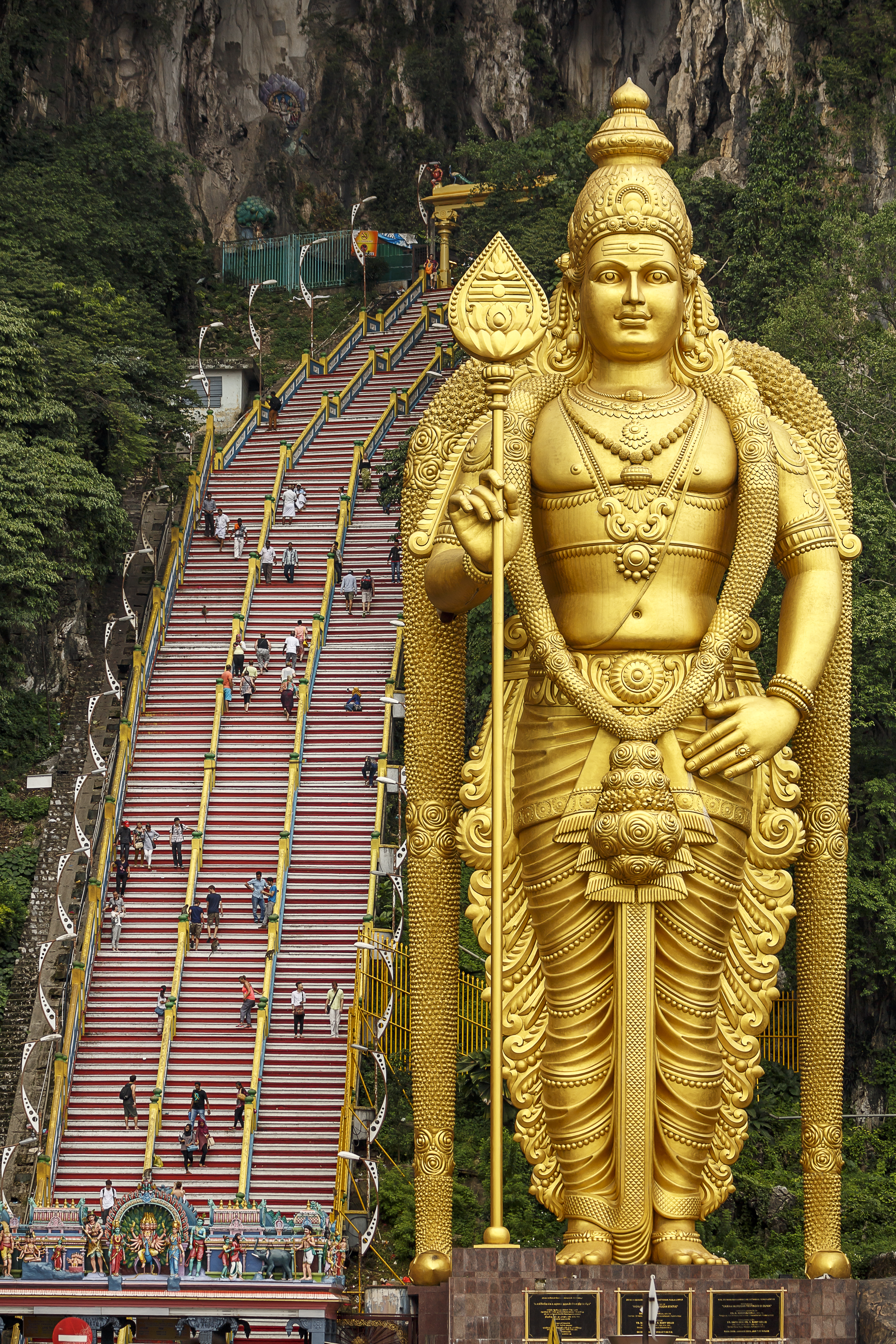
Statue of the Hindu God of War, Murugan, holding his primary weapon, the Vel. Batu Caves, Malaysia.

The Hindu god of war Murugan is worshipped by Tamils in the form of the spear called Vel, which is his primary weapon.

The term spear is also used (in a somewhat archaic manner) to describe the male line of a family, as opposed to the distaff or female line.

=== Legends ===
- Amenonuhoko, spear of Izanagi and Izanami, creator gods in Japanese mythology
- Gáe Bulg, spear of Cúchulainn, hero in Irish mythology
- Gáe Buide and Gáe Derg, spears of Diarmuid Ua Duibhne which could inflict wounds that none can recover from
- Green Dragon Crescent Blade, a guan dao wielded by General Guan Yu in the Romance of the Three Kingdoms
- Gungnir, spear of Odin, a god in Norse mythology
- Holy Lance, said to be the spear that pierced the side of Jesus
- Pelian Spear, a spear that only Achilles could wield, inherited from his father Peleus, made by Chiron from an ash tree on Mount Pelion.
- Rhongomyniad referred to simply as Ron ("spear") in Geoffrey of Monmouth's History of Britain, the spear of King Arthur.
- Serpent Spear wielded by General Zhang Fei in the Romance of the Three Kingdoms
- Spear of Fuchai, the spear used by Goujian's arch-rival, King Fuchai of Wu, in China
- Spear of Lugh, named after Lugh, a god in Irish mythology
- Trident, a three-pronged fishing spear associated with a number of water deities, including the Etruscan Nethuns, Greek Poseidon, and Roman Neptune.
- Trishula, a three-pronged spear wielded by the Hindu deities Durga and Shiva
- Vel, a flattened broad tipped spear used by the Hindu deity Murugan

== See also ==
- List of types of spears
- Viking Age arms and armour
- Spear (surname)

=== Related weapons ===
- Arrow
- Assegai
- Atlatl
- Bill
- Dart
- Glaive
- Halberd
- Javelin
- Kontos
- Lance
- Naginata
- Pike
- Pilum
- Polearm
- Projectile
- Spear thrower
- Woomera
- Xyston
