= Hoeroa =

Traditional Māori hand weapon

A hoeroa is a type of traditional hand weapon of the Māori, the indigenous people of New Zealand. It is traditionally a whalebone long club (slightly curved baton / long spear). The tool was four to five feet in length and was used as a striking weapon, stabbing spear, and missile weapon.

Examples of hoeroa:

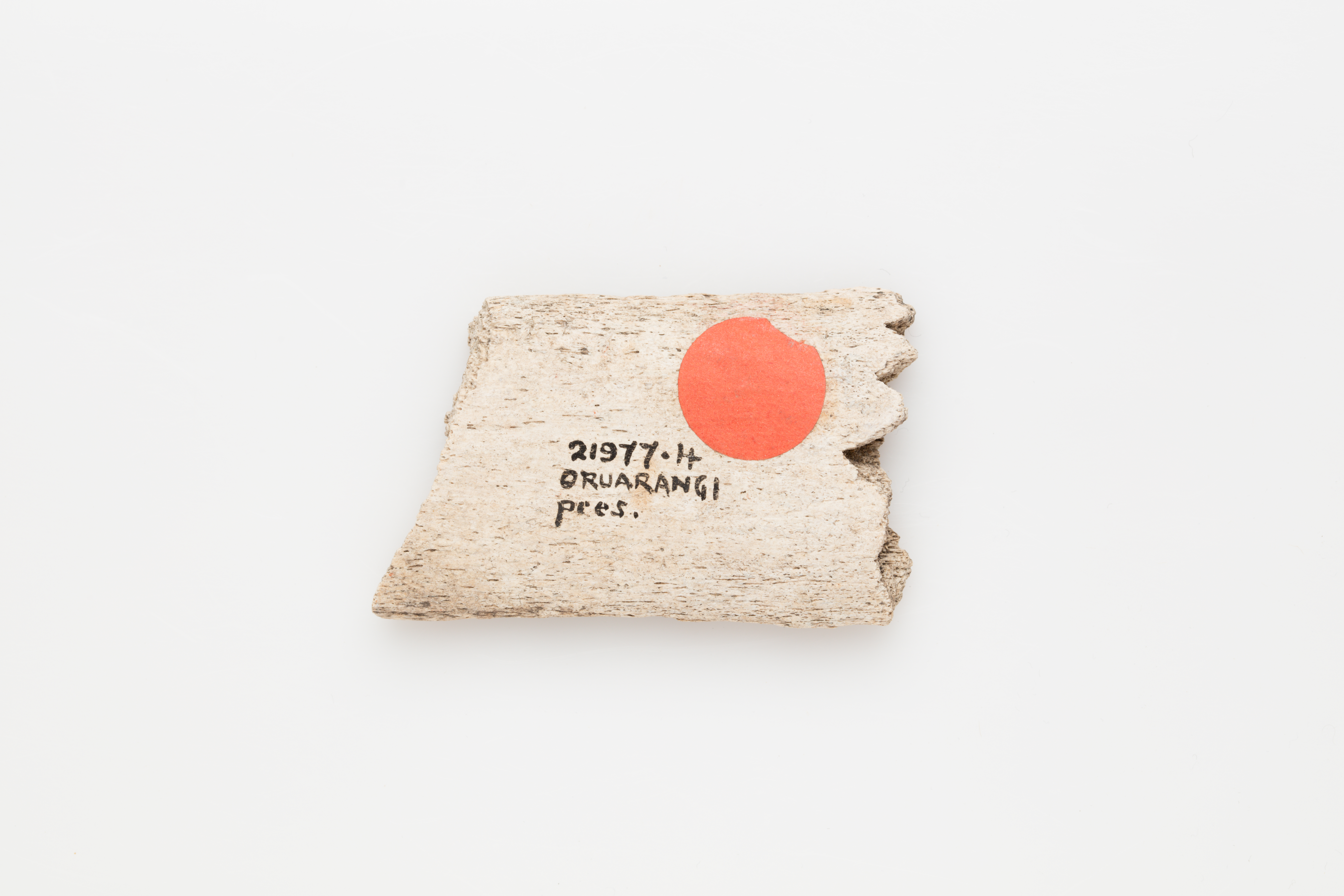

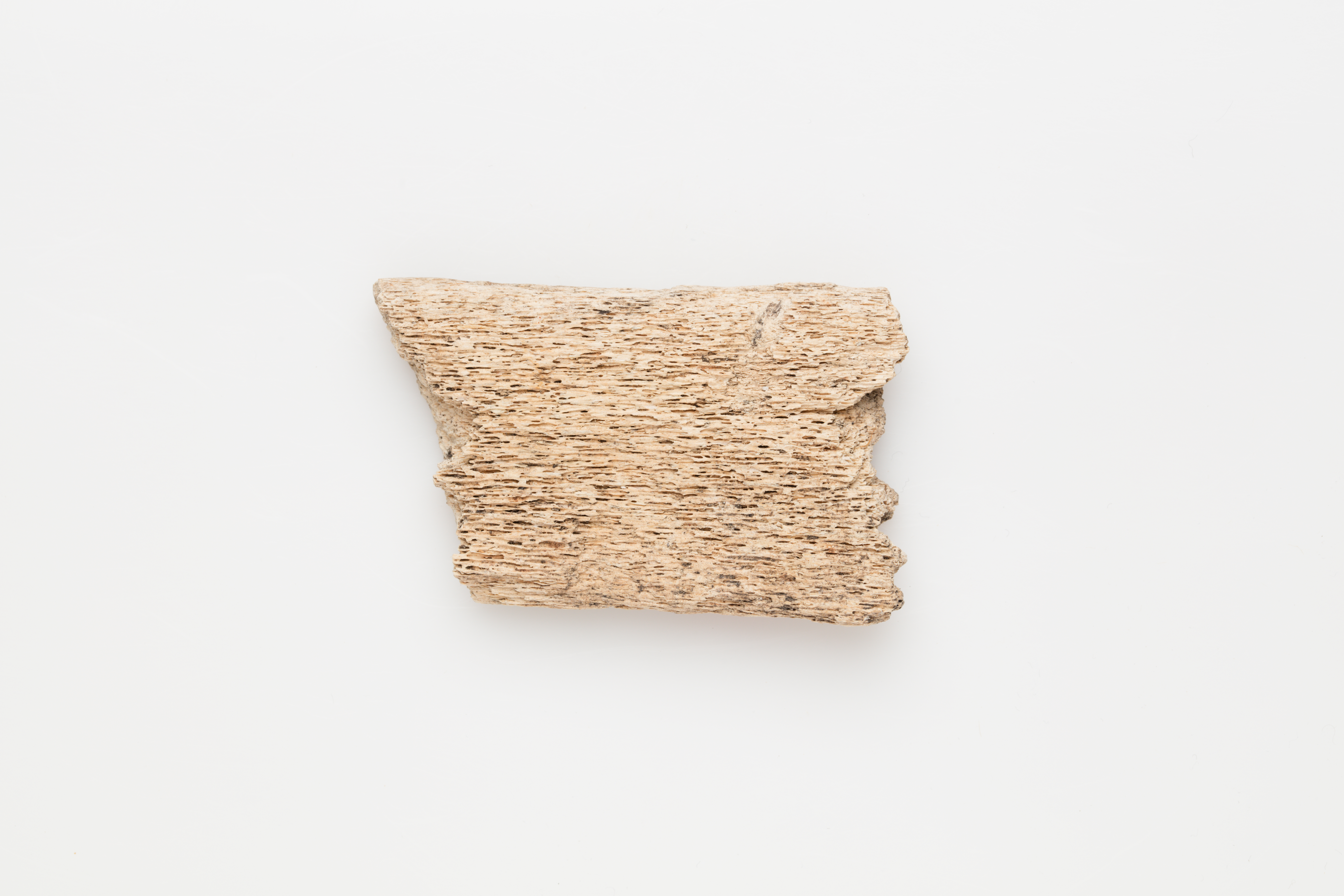

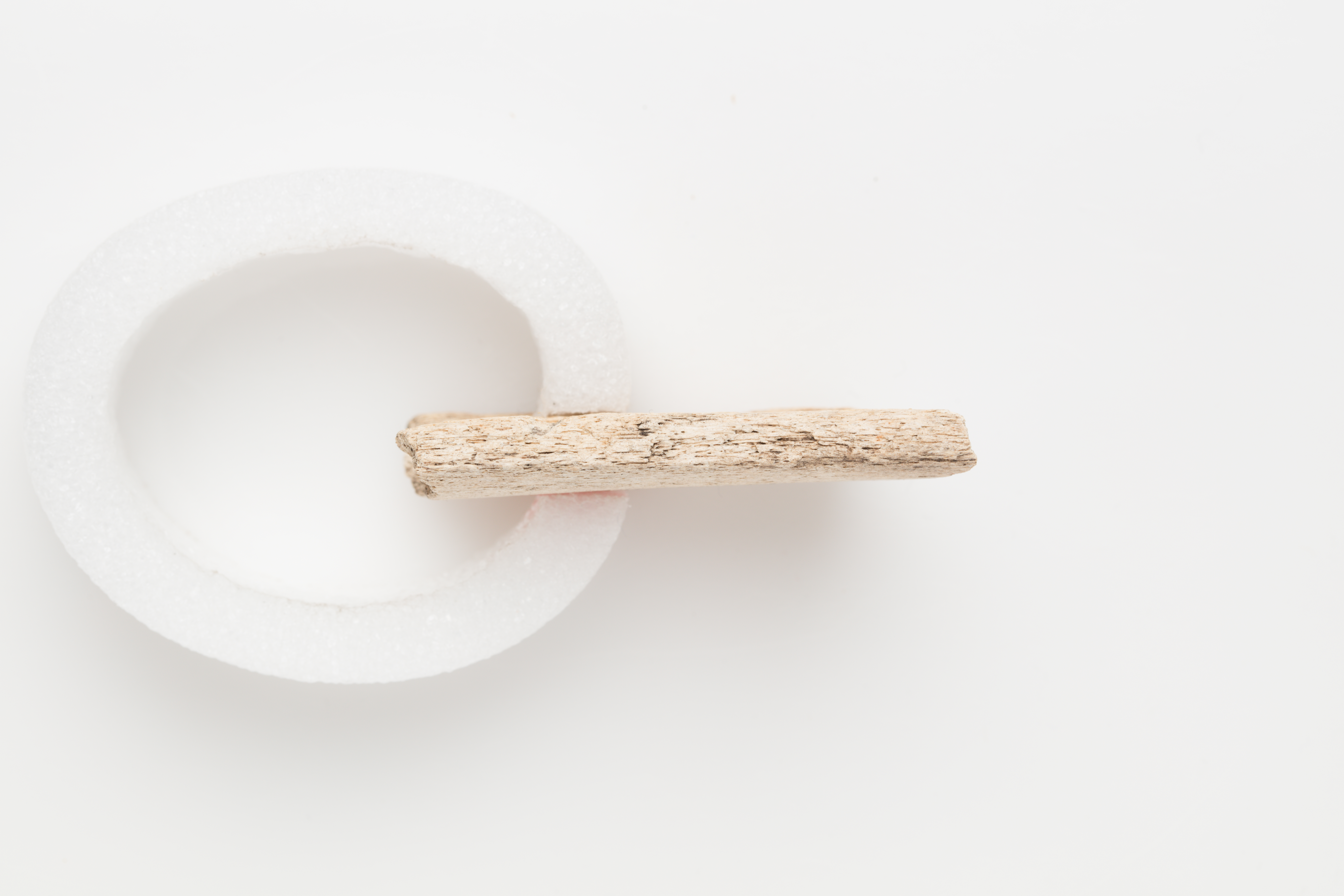

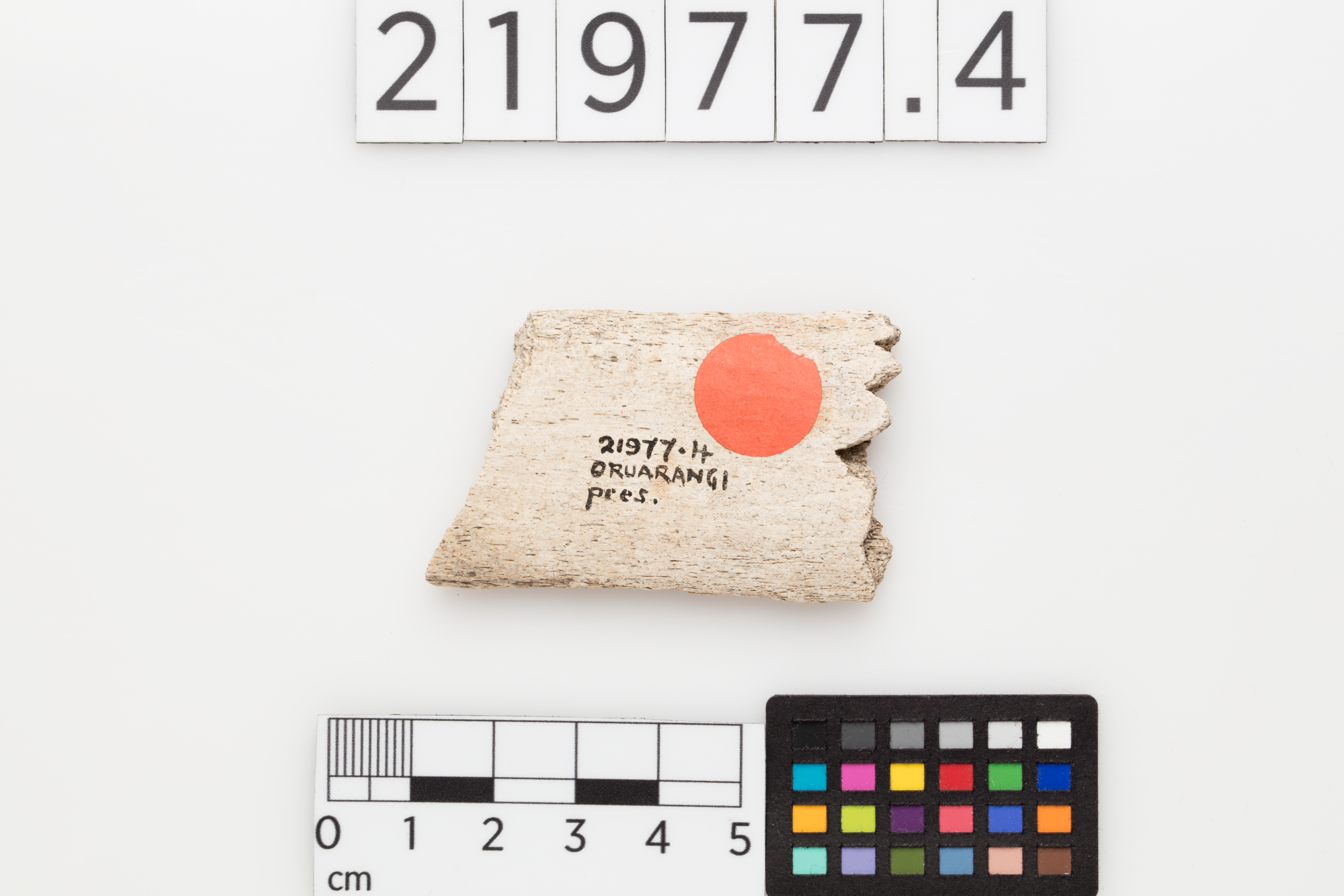
