= Toggling harpoon =

Harpoon technology used for whale and seal hunting

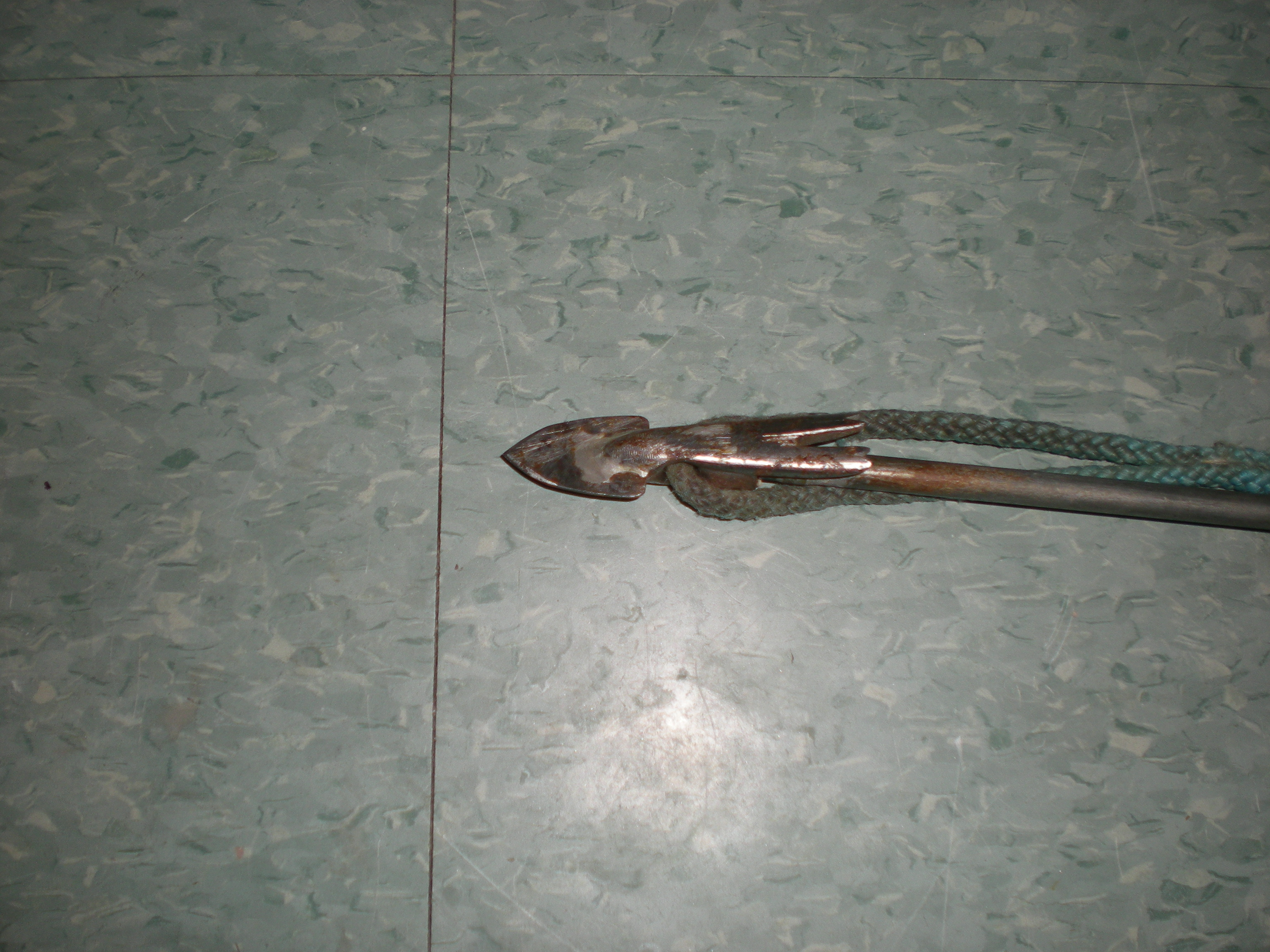
Modern Inuit toggling harpoon head used for seal hunting. On the harpoon handle.

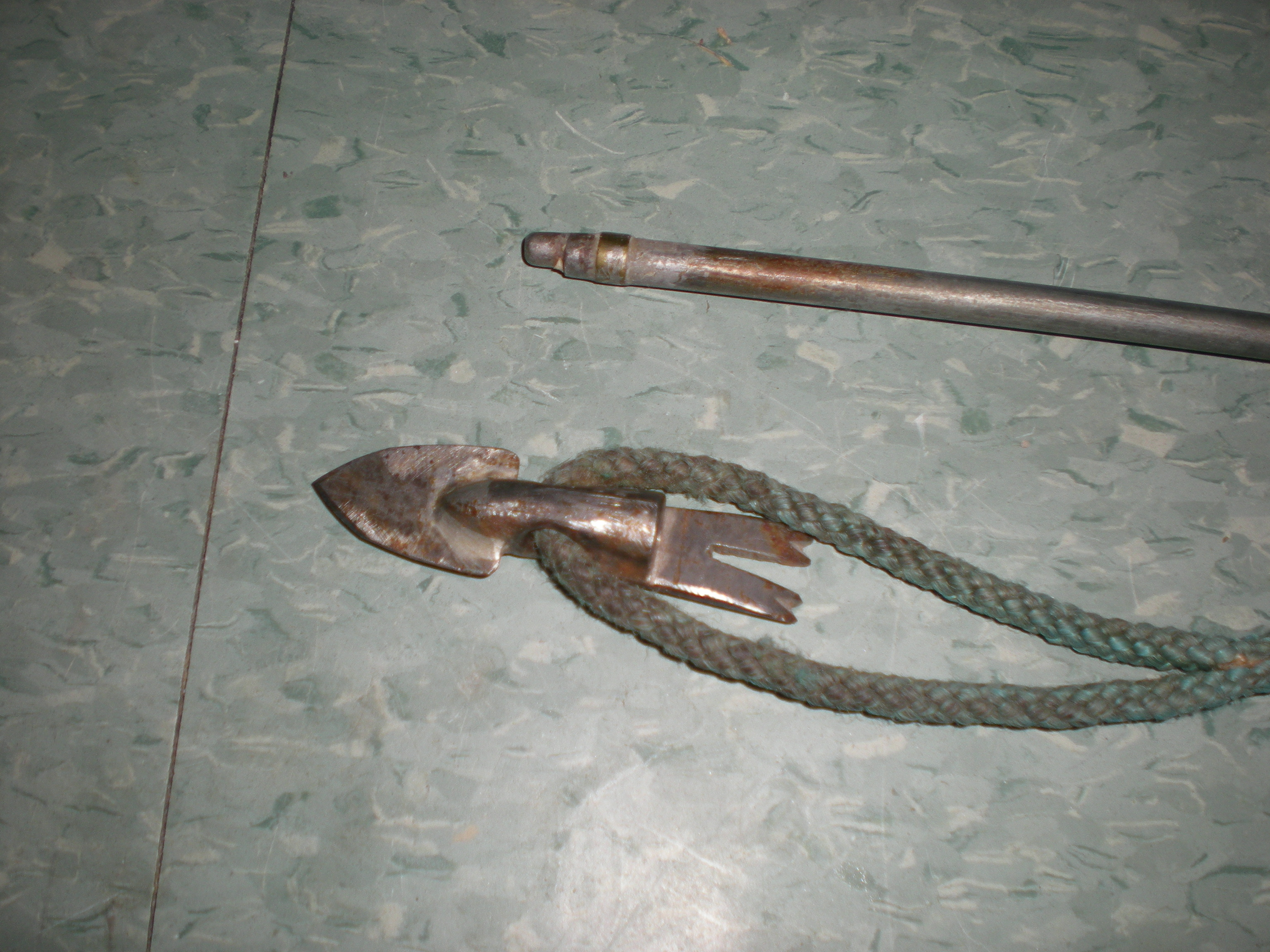
Modern Inuit toggling harpoon head used for seal hunting. Off the harpoon handle.

The toggling harpoon is an ancient weapon and tool used in whaling to impale a whale when thrown. Unlike earlier harpoon versions which had only one point, a toggling harpoon has a two-part point. One half of the point is firmly attached to the thrusting base, while the other half of the point is fitted over this first point like a cap and attached to the rest of the point with sinew or another string-like material. When the harpoon is thrust into an animal, the top half of the point detaches and twists horizontally into the animal under the skin, allowing hunters to haul the animal to ship or shore. This harpoon technology lodges the toggling head of the harpoon underneath both the animal's skin and blubber, and instead lodges the point in the muscle, which also prevents the harpoon slipping out.

== History ==
Toggling harpoons have ancient origins that are difficult to place with any precision or even to identify as such. In Serbia, a few antler artifacts in the shape of toggle harpoons have been made by the Vinča culture (D phase dated c. 4850–4500 cal BC), but their true use is not conclusive. Bronze toggling harpoon heads also appear in the Late Bronze Age in Hungary. Regardless, this technology seems to have been forgotten in Europe and all other appearances relate to the Arctic and northern Pacific. Norwegian archaeologist Gutorm Gjessing claimed to identify a distribution of toggle harpoons from Greenland to as far west as the White Sea of western Russia. However, Soviet archaeologist Sergei Rudenko contested this claim, stating that none of the western Arctic harpoons given by Gjessing counted as true toggling harpoons and that his field was not "aware of any trace of Eskimo culture in north-west Asia west of the Kolyma".

The earliest unequivocal evidence of toggling harpoons are found in the Siberian Arctic, connected to Paleo-Inuit migrations. From the lower Amur Basin, and itself probably derived from the coast of Chukotka, points identified as harpoon heads spread down into Hokkaido and into the hands of the Jomon culture close to 6,000 years ago. The Chyortov Ovrag site on Wrangell Island, dating to the early second millennium BCE, contains evidence of toggling harpoon heads that may have been the predecessors of more sophisticated ones found in the later Old Bering Sea culture, which in turn gave rise to the later Inuit who spread sophisticated harpoon technologies to the east. However, in the early second millennium BCE, evidence of toggling harpoons was found among the Red Paint People of Port aux Choix off the coast of Newfoundland, further driving debates of Paleo-Inuit cross-cultural diffusion that have gone on since the 19th century. Toggle-headed harpoons spread south down the Pacific coast as far as California by the 2nd millennium CE, and south down inland routes as far as the Great Plains by the early Plains Village period.

Despite Basque, English and Dutch whalers operating in and near the Arctic and interacting with the Inuit for centuries, they had continued to use simple, non-toggling harpoon heads that they had desperately tried and failed to improve. It wasn't until the approach of the 19th century when Inuit and Native American harpoons were looked at in closer detail and potentially inspired versions in steel such as the one-flued harpoon (intended to bend inside the whale), the grommet iron and, later in 1848, the toggle iron developed by Lewis Temple.

For the grommet iron, the pivoting head and the shaft of this harpoon were held parallel by means of a grommet banded around them. The grommet slid off when the iron penetrated the whale (or fish), allowing the head to toggle open as the barb caught in the tissue.

Lewis Temple's harpoon represented the finalization of European toggle harpoon designs. Temple, an African-American blacksmith in New Bedford, Massachusetts, adapted the toggling harpoon using a wooden shear pin to initially brace the toggle head, and created what came to be known as Temple's Toggle and later simply as the toggle iron or iron toggle harpoon. This harpoon became a whaling standard and replaced the fixed-point "two flue" and "single flue" harpoons that were widely used previously.

== A symbol ==
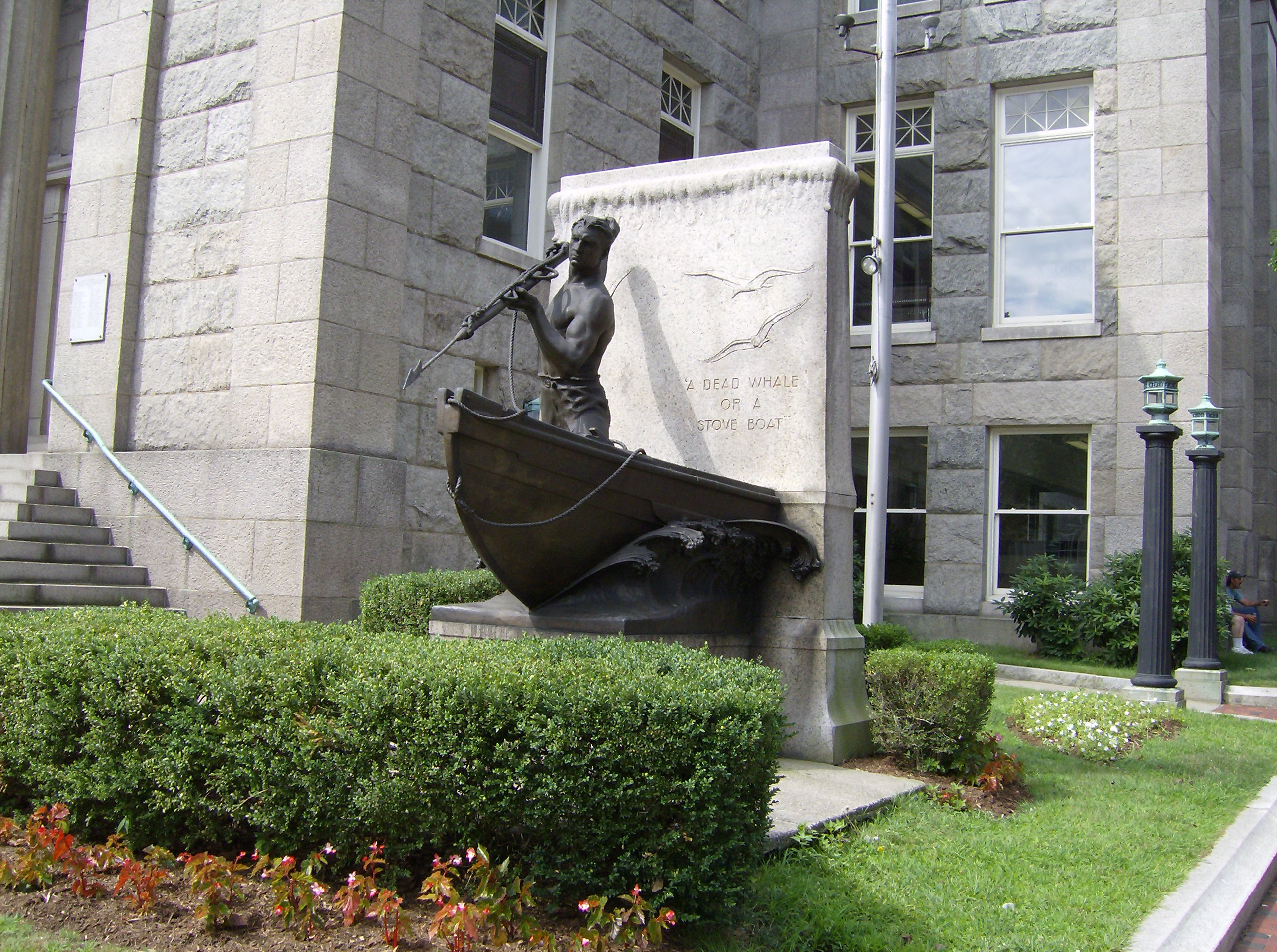
A statue of a Whaler outside the New Bedford public library

This harpoon became so important to the industry that its shape continues to symbolize whaling in the modern day. A statue of a whaler hefting a toggling harpoon in New Bedford, Massachusetts, has come to act as a symbol for the city itself.
