= Two-flue harpoon =

Long spear-like instrument used in marine hunting

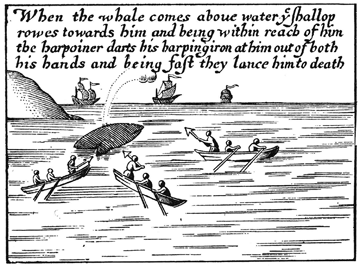
An engraving showing a two flue harpoon used in whaling

The two-flue harpoon or two-flue iron (which, together with the one-flue harpoon, were known as common harpoons) is a type of harpoon used in whaling for at least 1000 years. It appears in works of art dating back to the 14th century.

In the early 19th century the design was modified, and the one-flue harpoon was created. By removing half of the point, the chance of the point cutting its way back out of the whale was greatly reduced.

== See also ==
- Toggling harpoon
