= Hoko yari =

Japanese pole weapon

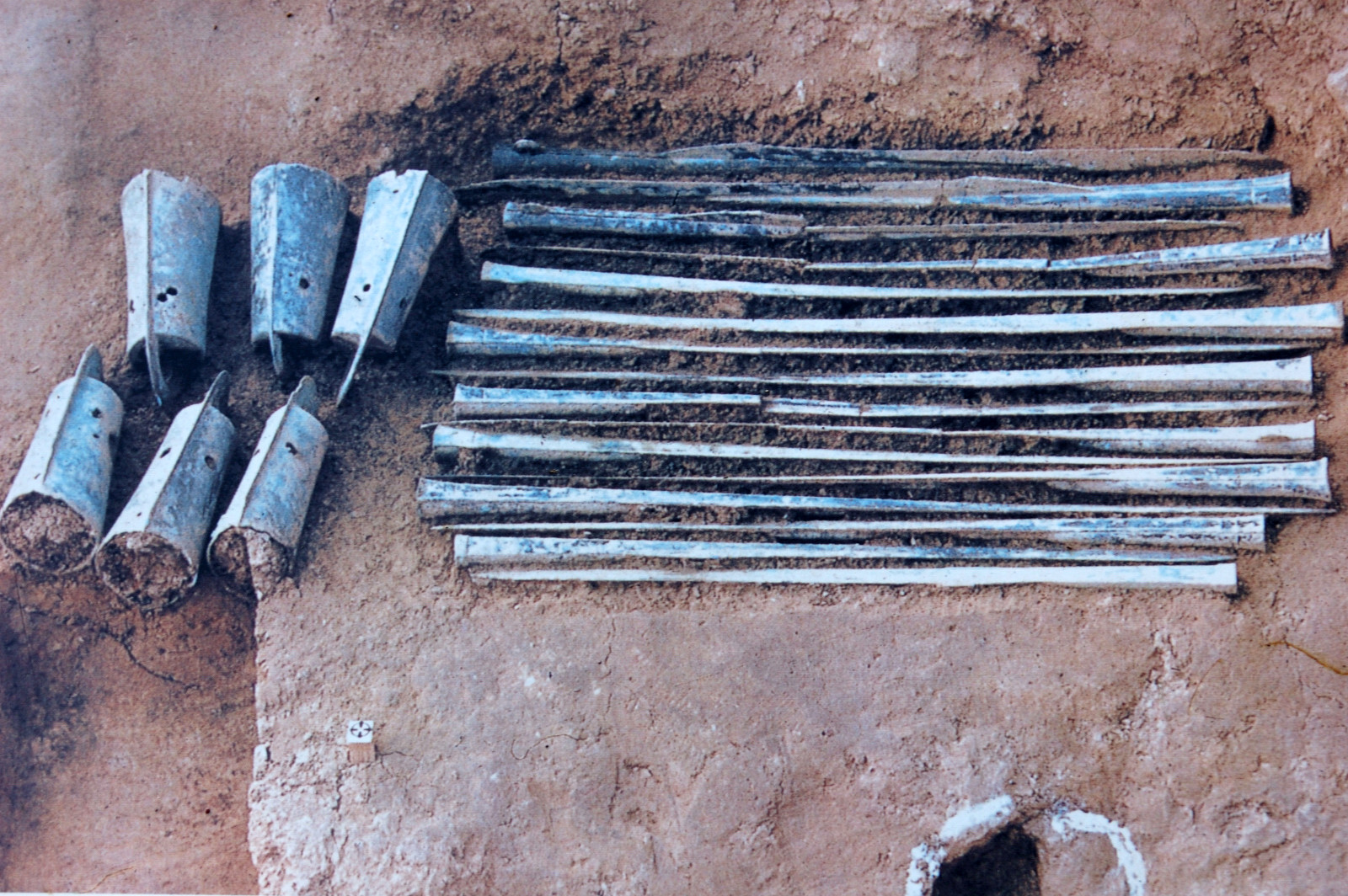
Bronze hoko spears and dōtaku ritual bells excavated at the Kōjindani Site (ja:荒神谷遺跡) in Hikawa, Shimane

Hoko (矛) or Hoko yari is an ancient form of yari (lance) from Japan said to be based on a Chinese model.

The hoko came into use sometime between the Yayoi and the Heian, possibly as late as the Nara period (the 8th century).

== Appearance and use ==
The hoko was thought to be a guard's spear used in the defence of palisades and gates. One source describes the hoko as being mounted on a two-meter pole with a 20 cm (7.9 in) blade, either in a leaf shape or with a wavy edge similar to the Malay kris. Like the later-period fukuro-yari (袋槍), the metal blade had a hollow socket for the pole to fit into rather than a long tang. A hoko could also have a sickle-shaped horn projecting out and slightly forward on one or both sides of the blade, indicating that this weapon was primarily used to thrust back an enemy.

== More Info ==
The hoko (Early Middle Japanese foko) was an early socketed lance that bridged prehistoric tools and the weaponry of the samurai era. Originating in the Yayoi as bronze ritual and combat implements, they evolved into iron forms by the Nara. Characterized by straight, leaf-shaped blades mounted on two to four-meter shafts, they were primarily used for thrusting in infantry formations.

Archaeological finds at sites like Kōjindani highlight their dual role as battlefield weapons and spiritual symbols. Though eventually superseded by the naginata and classical yari, the hoko influenced later specialized polearms and enduring Japanese martial arts traditions. Significant archaeological discoveries, such as those at the Kōjindani Site, reveal their use in spiritual offerings alongside swords and dōtaku (ritual bells).

While the hoko's practical battlefield dominance declined by the Kamakura period in favor of the more versatile naginata and yari, the hoko maintained a lasting legacy. It continued as a ceremonial symbol of authority and divine protection in Shinto rituals and processional standards. Furthermore, its design influenced specialized later weapons such as the jumonji-yari (十文字槍), thereby ensuring its technical legacy.

== See also ==
- Ame-no-Nuboko
