= One-flue harpoon =

Long spear-like instrument used in marine hunting

The one-flue harpoon or one-flue iron (sometimes "single" instead of "one" is used) is a type of harpoon used in whaling after its introduction in the early 19th century when it replaced the two-flue harpoon. Due to the asymmetric design of the head for which it is named, the one-flue harpoon was less likely to cut its way out of the whale meat and blubber, and was therefore more successful in whaling.

In the mid-19th century the one flue harpoon was replaced by the toggling harpoon, which was an iron version of the ancient design used in the Arctic by the native whale hunters there. The toggling iron harpoon was even more successful and rapidly phased out the use of the "common harpoon" (a term which refers to either the one or two flue harpoon).
