= Hasta pura (military decoration) =

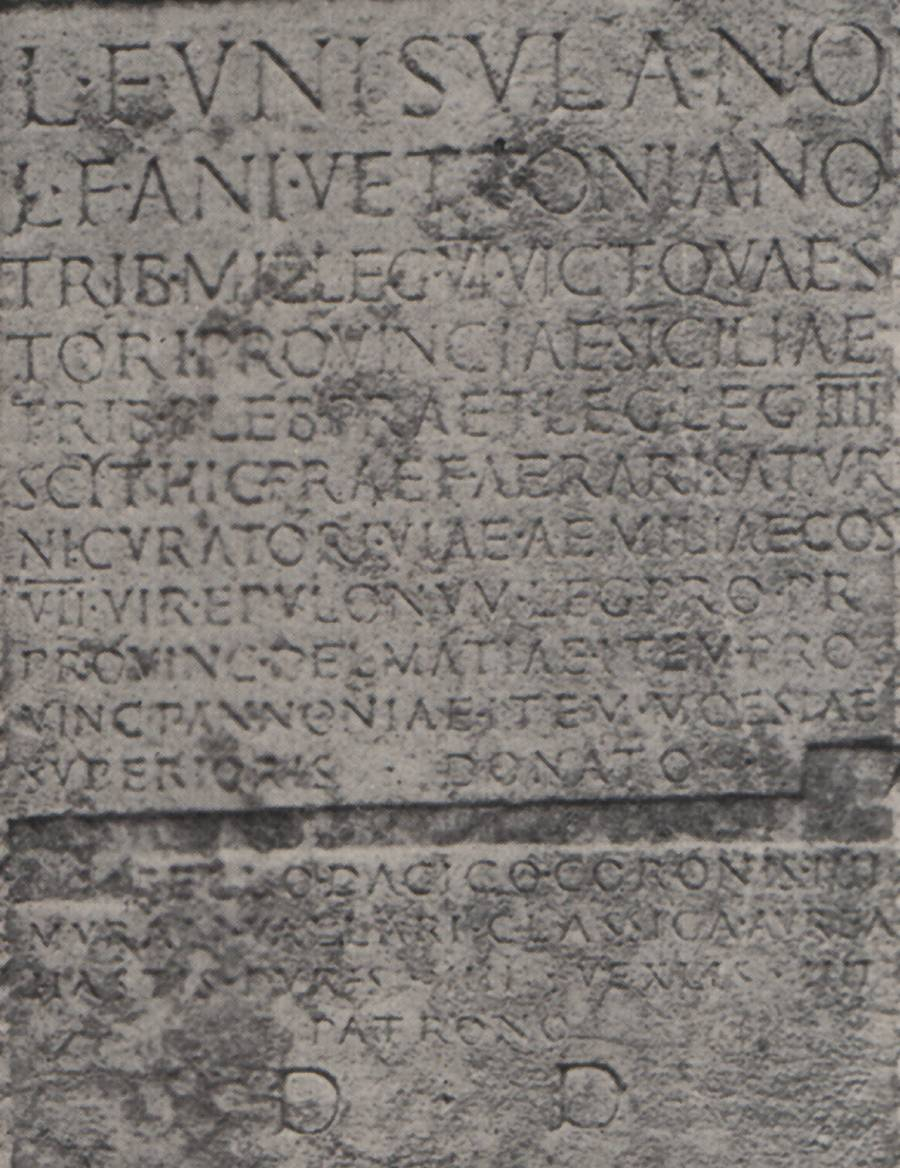
Imperial-era inscription from Andautonia, present-day Croatia, commemorating the career of a military man whose listed achievements and awards include the hasta pura

The hasta pura or hasta donatica was a decoration for merit, awarded in Ancient Rome. The Roman sources do not concur about the precise character of the decoration. Some call it a decoration for valour, others mention that it had been awarded to civilians.

The hasta was a thrusting weapon that was not thrown as were the later pilum, verutum and lancea. A hasta pura was a spear made "without iron" and was in the earliest times the reward of a soldier the first time that he conquered in battle. Later it came to be awarded to a soldier who had struck down an enemy in a sally or skirmish.

Tacitus records a hasta pura being given as a decoration, bestowed upon a soldier for saving the life of a fellow-citizen:

In this engagement Rufus Helvius, a common soldier, won the honour of saving a citizen's life, and was rewarded by Apronius with a torc and a spear. To these the emperor added the civic crown, complaining, but without anger, that Apronius had not used his right as proconsul to bestow this further distinction.

A civil servant called Tiberius Claudius Balbilus was awarded the hasta pura and perhaps also the corona aurea by emperor Claudius during the triumph to celebrate the conquest of Britain in AD 44. As a friend and part of the Emperor’s retinue, it seems likely that his awards, as much as his military rank, were honorary.

The hasta pura was also recorded as being given to the primus pilus when he had completed his period of service. Also, such a gift is sometimes recorded in funereal inscriptions.

Some have taken "without iron" to mean that the hasta pura had no head at all. The main evidence in support of this conjecture is that representations on some coins show a blunt spear. However, other coins clearly show a sharp spearhead and those that do not may be explained by poorly made coins or poorly drawn representations of them in publications.

The hasta pura is mentioned in the second part of the Claudius novels by Robert Graves. Graves calls the decoration an "arrow without a head", and refers to its award to Balbilus.
