= Spiculum =

Ancient Roman weapon

A spiculum is a late Roman spear that replaced the pilum as the infantryman's main throwing javelin around 250 AD. Scholars suppose that it could have resulted from the gradual combination of the pilum and two German spears, the angon and the bebra. As more and more Germans joined the Roman army, their culture and traditions became a driving force for change. The spiculum was better than the old pilum when used as a thrusting spear, but still maintained some of the former weapon's penetrative power when thrown.

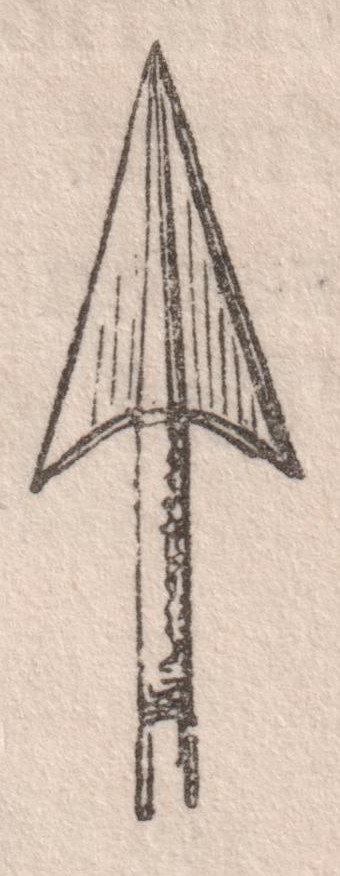
Illustration of a spiculum

Vegetius mentions the spiculum in his military manual, but some scholars maintain that the spiculum was simply a different name for the pilum. Whatever the case, most historians accept that the spiculum evolved from the earlier javelins used by the Roman army.

== Design ==
The main difference between the spiculum and the pilum was the length of the thin point. The spiculum tended to have a much shorter iron point. Thus, the spiculum was a bit shorter than its ancestor, perhaps 190 cm (75 in) long. The spiculum had a medium iron shank attached to the head. Its exact design is not fully known as there were many variants. The spiculum fell out of favour with the Roman army some time after 400 AD. Later versions often had a barbed head that made it more difficult to be removed from the target.

== See also ==
- Roman military personal equipment
- Polearm
- Javelin
- Lancea (weapon)
- Verutum
