= Angon (disambiguation) =

Angon can refer to several meanings:

- Angon, the ancient name for the Italian port of [Ancona
- Angon, a weapon, a javelin, of the Early Middle Ages
- Angón, a Spanish municipality
- Angono, Rizal, a Philippine municipality
- Angon a family name in the Philippines
- Angon a family name in the English list with Coat of Arms
