= Praetorian Guard =

Bodyguards of the Roman emperors

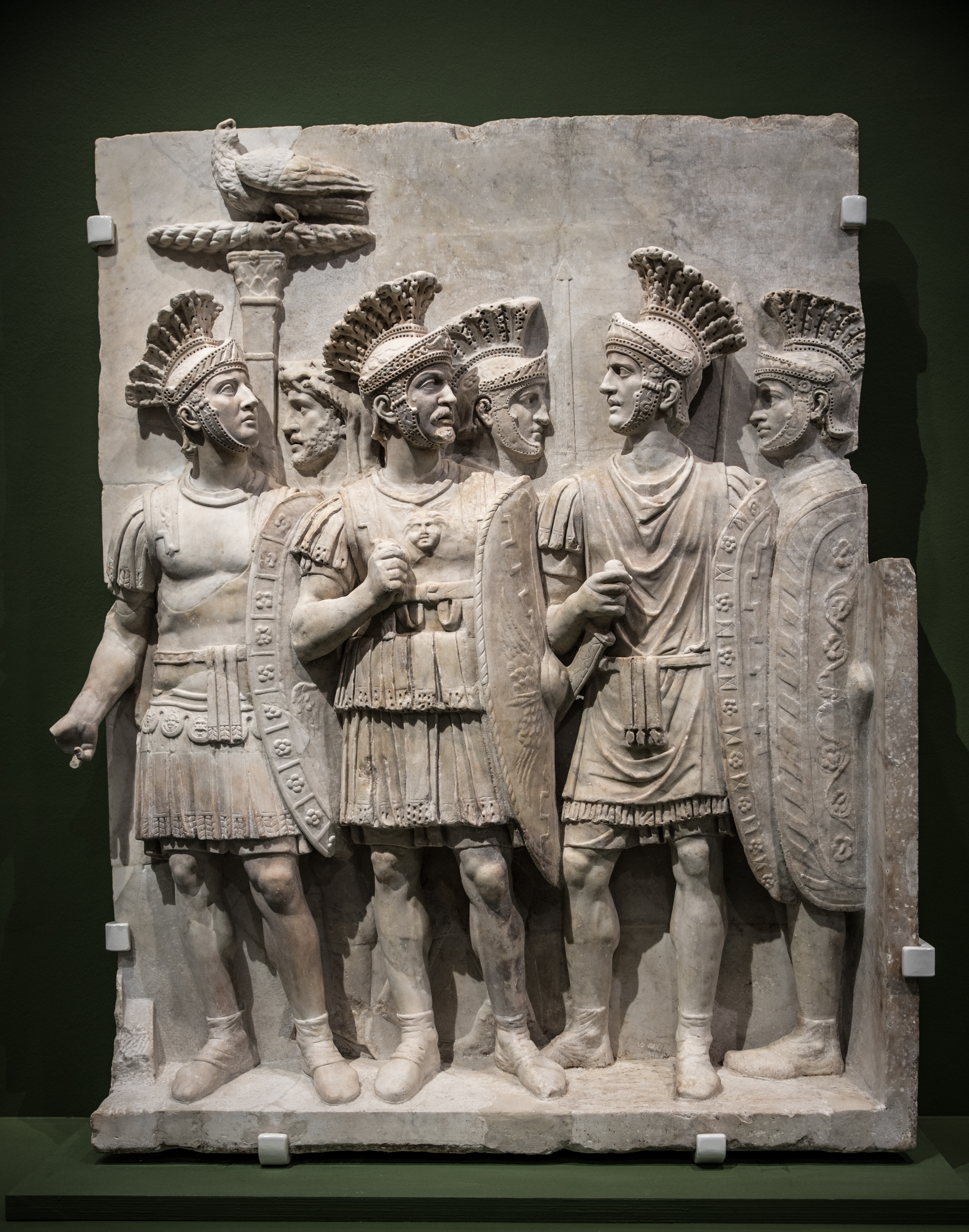
The Praetorians Relief with an aquila grasping a thunderbolt through its claws, in reference to the Roman interpretatio graeca form of Jupiter.

The Praetorian Guard (Latin: cohortes praetoriae) was the imperial guard of the Imperial Roman army that served various roles for the Roman emperor including being a bodyguard unit, counterintelligence, crowd control and gathering military intelligence.

During the Roman Republic, the Praetorian Guards were escorts for high-ranking political officials and were bodyguards for the senior officers of the Roman legions. In 27 BC, after Rome's transition from republic to empire, the first emperor of Rome, Augustus, designated the Praetorians as his personal security escort. For three centuries, the guards of the Roman emperor were also known for their palace intrigues; the Praetorians could overthrow an emperor and then proclaim his successor as the new caesar of Rome. In AD 312, Constantine the Great disbanded the Praetorian Guard and destroyed their barracks at the Castra Praetoria.

== In the Roman Republic ==
The Praetorian Guard originated as bodyguards for Roman generals in the period of the Roman Republic (509–27 BC). During the longer campaigns of the Roman army of the late Republic, the personal bodyguard unit was the norm for a commander in the field. At camp, the cohors praetoria, a cohort of praetorians guarding the commander, was posted near the praetorium, the tent of the commander.

The first historical record of the praetorians is as bodyguards for the Scipio family, ca. 275 BC. Generals with imperium (command authority of an army) also held public office, either as a magistrate or as a promagistrate; each was provided with lictors to protect the person of the office-holder. In practice, the offices of Roman consul and of proconsul each had twelve lictors, whilst the offices of praetor and of propraetor each had six lictors. In the absence of an assigned, permanent personal bodyguard, senior field officers safeguarded themselves with temporary bodyguard units of selected soldiers. In Hispania Citerior, during the Siege of Numantia (134–133 BC), General Scipio Aemilianus safeguarded himself with a troop of 500 soldiers against the sorties of siege warfare aimed at killing Roman field commanders.

At the end of 40 BC, two of the three co-rulers who were the Second Triumvirate, Octavian and Mark Antony, had Praetorian Guards. Octavian installed his praetorians within the pomerium, the religious and legal boundary of Rome; this was the first occasion when troops were permanently garrisoned in Rome proper. In the Orient, Antony commanded three cohorts; in 32 BC, Antony issued coins honouring his Praetorian Guard. According to the historian Orosius, Octavian commanded five cohorts at the Battle of Actium in 31 BC; in the aftermath of Roman civil war, the victorious Octavian then merged his forces with the forces of Antony as symbolic of their political reunification. At this point the force numbered at most 5 400 men organised into nine cohorts. Later, as Augustus, the first Roman emperor (27 BC–AD 14), Octavian retained the Praetorians as his imperial bodyguard.

== Under the empire ==
The legionaries known as the Praetorian Guard were first hand-picked veterans of the Roman army who served as bodyguards to the emperor. First established by Augustus, members of the Guard accompanied him on active campaign, protecting the civic administrations and rule of law imposed by the Senate and the emperor. The Praetorian Guard was ultimately dissolved by Emperor Constantine I in the early 4th century. They were distinct from the Imperial German Bodyguard which provided close personal protection for the early Roman emperors. They benefited from several advantages via their close proximity with the emperor: the Praetorians were the only ones admitted while bearing arms in the center of sacred Rome, the Pomerium.

Their mandatory service was shorter in duration, for instance: 12 years with the Praetorians instead of 16 years in the legions starting year 13 BC, then carried to, respectively, 16 to 20 years in year 5 BC according to Tacitus. Their pay was higher than that of a legionary. Under Nero, the pay of a Praetorian was three and a half times that of a legionary, augmented by prime additions of donativum, granted by each new emperor. This additional pay was the equivalent of several years of pay and was often repeated at important events of the empire or events that touched the imperial family: birthdays, births and marriages. Major monetary distributions or food subsidies renewed and compensated the fidelity of the Praetorians following each failed particular attempted plot (such as that of Messalina against Claudius in AD 48 or Piso against Nero in AD 65). The Praetorians received substantially higher pay than other Roman soldiers in any of the legions, on a system known as sesquiplex stipendum, or by pay-and-a-half. So if the legionaries received 250 denarii, the guards received 375 per annum. Domitian and Septimius Severus increased the stipendum (payment) to 1,500 denarii per year, distributed in January, May and September.

Feared and dreaded by the population and by the Roman Senate, the Praetorians received no sympathy from the Roman people. A famous poem by Juvenal recalls the nail left in his foot by the sandal of a Praetorian rushing by him. "Praetorian" has a pejorative sense in French, recalling the often troubling role of the Praetorian of antiquity.

=== History ===
In ancient Rome, praetors were either civic or military leaders. The praetorians were initially elite guards for military praetors, under the republic. The early Praetorian Guard was very different from what it became later, as a vital force in the power politics of Rome. While Augustus understood the need to have a protector in the maelstrom of Rome, he was careful to uphold the Republican veneer of his regime. Thus, he allowed only nine cohorts to be formed, each originally consisting of 500 men. He then increased them to 1,000 men each, allowing three units to be on duty at any given time in the capital. A small number of detached cavalry units (turmae) of 30 men each were also organized. While they patrolled inconspicuously in the palace and major buildings, the others were stationed in the towns surrounding Rome. This system was not radically changed with the appointment by Augustus in 2 BC of two Praetorian prefects, Quintus Ostorius Scapula and Publius Salvius Aper, although organization and command were enhanced. Tacitus reports that the number of cohorts was increased to twelve from nine in AD 47. In AD 69 it was briefly increased to sixteen cohorts by Vitellius, but Vespasian quickly reduced it again to nine.

==== Under the Julio-Claudian dynasty ====
In Rome, the guards' principal duty was to mount the Guard at the house of Augustus on the Palatine, where the centuries and the turmae of the cohort in service mounted the guard outside the emperor's palace (the interior guard of the palace was mounted by the Imperial German Bodyguard, often also referred to as Batavi, and the Statores Augusti, a sort of military police which were found in the general staff headquarters of the Roman Army). Every afternoon, the tribunus cohortis would receive the password from the emperor personally. The command of this cohort was assumed directly by the emperor and not by the Praetorian prefect. After the construction of the Praetorian camp in 23 BC, another similar serving tribune was placed in the Praetorian camp. The guards' functions included, among many, escorting the emperor and the members of the imperial family and, if necessary, to act as a sort of riot police. Certain Empresses exclusively commanded their own Praetorian Guard.

According to Tacitus, in the year 23 BC, there were nine Praetorian cohorts (4,500 men, the equivalent of a legion) to maintain peace in Italy; three were stationed in Rome, and the others nearby.

According to Boris Rankov in 1994, an inscription recently discovered suggested that, towards the end of the reign of Augustus, the number of cohorts increased to 12 during a brief period. This inscription referred to one man who was the tribune of two successive cohorts: the eleventh cohort, apparently at the end of the reign of Augustus, and the fourth at the beginning of the reign of Tiberius. According to Tacitus, there were only nine cohorts in 23 AD. The three urban cohorts, which were numbered consecutively after the Praetorian cohorts, were removed near the end of the reign of Augustus; it seemed probable that the last three Praetorian cohorts were simply renamed as urban cohorts.

The Praetorians first intervened on a battlefield since the wars of the end of the Republic during the mutinies of Pannonia and the mutinies of Germania. On the death of Augustus in AD 14, his successor Tiberius was confronted by mutinies in the two armies of the Rhine and Pannonia, who were protesting about their conditions of service being worse than the Praetorians. The forces of Pannonia were dealt with by Drusus Julius Caesar, son of Tiberius (distinct from Nero Claudius Drusus, brother of Tiberius), accompanied by two Praetorian cohorts, the Praetorian Cavalry, and Imperial German Bodyguards. The mutiny in Germania was repressed by the nephew and designated heir of Tiberius, Germanicus, who later led legions and detachments of the Guard in a two-year campaign in Germania, and succeeded in recovering two of the three legionary eagles which had been lost at the Battle of the Teutoburg Forest.

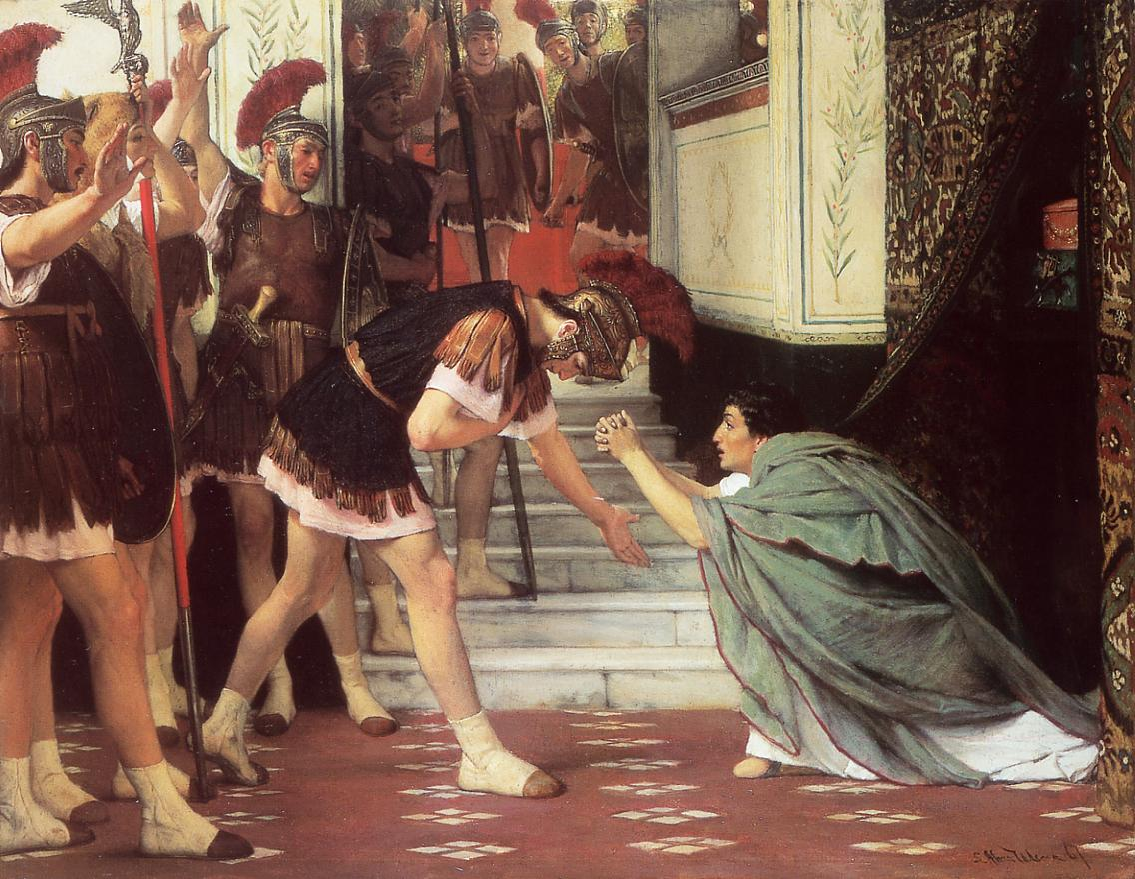
Proclaiming Claudius Emperor, by Lawrence Alma-Tadema, oil on canvas, 1867. According to one version of the story of Claudius' accession, members of the Praetorian Guard found him hiding behind a curtain in the aftermath of the assassination of Caligula in AD 41, and proclaimed him emperor.

Sejanus rose in power under Tiberius, and was among the first prefects to exploit his position to pursue his own ambitions. He concentrated under his command all the Praetorian cohorts in the new camp. Sejanus held the title of prefect jointly with his father, under Augustus, but became sole prefect in AD 15, and used the position to render himself essential to the new emperor Tiberius, who was unable to persuade the Senate to share the responsibility of governing the Empire. Sejanus, however, alienated Drusus, son of Tiberius, and when Germanicus, the heir to the throne, died in AD 19 he was worried that Drusus would become the new emperor. Accordingly, he poisoned Drusus with the help of the latter's wife, and immediately launched a ruthless elimination program against all competitors, persuading Tiberius to make him his heir apparent. He almost succeeded, but his plot was discovered and revealed in AD 31, and Tiberius had him killed by the Cohortes urbanae, who were not under Sejanus's control.

In AD 37 Caligula became emperor with the support of Naevius Sutorius Macro, Sejanus' successor as prefect of the Praetorian Guard. Under Caligula, whose reign lasted until AD 41, the overall strength of the Guard increased from 9 to 12 Praetorian cohorts.

In year 41, disgust and hostility of a praetorian tribune, named Cassius Chaerea – whom Caligula teased without mercy due to his squeaky voice – led to the assassination of the emperor by officers of the guard. While the Imperial German Bodyguard sacked all in a search to apprehend the murderers, the Senate proclaimed the restoration of a Republic. The Praetorians, who were pillaging the Palace, discovered Claudius, uncle of Caligula, hidden behind a curtain. Needing an emperor to justify their own existence, they brought him forth to the Praetorian camp and proclaimed him emperor, the first emperor proclaimed by the Praetorian Guard. He compensated the guard with a prime bonus worth five years their salary. The Praetorians accompanied Emperor Claudius to Britain in 43 AD.

When Claudius was poisoned, the Guard transferred their allegiance to Nero through the influence of his Praetorian prefect Sextus Afranius Burrus, who exercised a beneficial influence on the new emperor during the first eight years of his reign (Burrus died in 62 AD). Officers of the Guard, including one of the two successors of Burrus as the Praetorian prefect, participated in Piso's conspiracy in year 65. The other Praetorian prefect, Tigellinus, headed the suppression of the conspiracy, and the members of the Guard were paid a bonus of 500 denarii each.

==== Year of the Four Emperors ====
In AD 68, the new colleague of Tigellinus, Nymphidius Sabinus, managed to have the Praetorian Guard abandon Nero in favor of the contender Galba. Nymphidius Sabinus had promised 7,500 denarii per man, but Galba refused to pay, saying "It is my habit to recruit soldiers and not buy them". This permitted his rival Otho to bribe 23 Speculatores of the Praetorian Guard to proclaim him emperor. Despite the opposition of the cohorts in service in the palace, Galba and his designated successor, the young Piso, were lynched on 15 January.

After supporting Otho against a third contender, Vitellius, the Praetorians were restrained following defeat and their centurions executed. They were replaced by 16 cohorts recruited from the legionnaires and auxiliaries loyal to Vitellius, almost 16,000 men. These ex-Praetorians then aided Vespasian, the fourth Emperor, leading the attack against the Praetorian camp.

==== Flavian dynasty ====
Under the Flavians, the Praetorians formed nine new cohorts, of which Titus, son of emperor Vespasian, became the prefect. Vespasian returned the effective strength of each unit to five hundred men. He also cancelled the guard service of the Praetorians at the entry to the emperor's palace, but retained guards within the palace itself.

Under Vespasian's second son, Domitian, the number of cohorts was increased to 10, and the Praetorian Guard participated in fighting in Germania and on the Danube against the Dacians. It was in the course of these actions that the prefect Cornelius Fuscus was defeated and killed in 86.

==== Antonine dynasty ====
Following assassination of Domitian in 96 the Praetorians demanded the execution of their prefect, Titus Petronius Secundus, who had been implicated in the murder.

At the death of Nerva, at the beginning of 98, the Guard supported Trajan, commander of the Army of the Rhine, as new emperor. He executed the remaining Praetorian prefect and his partisans. Trajan returned to Rome from the Rhine, probably accompanied by the new unit of equites singulares Augusti. The Praetorian Guard had participated in Trajan's two Dacian Wars (101–102 and 105–106). The Praetorian Guard served in the last campaign of Trajan against the Parthians of 113–117.

During the 2nd century, the Praetorian Guard accompanied Lucius Verus in the Oriental War Campaign of 161–166 AD, and accompanied Roman emperor Marcus Aurelius in his northern campaigns of 169–175 and 178–180. Two prefects were killed during these expeditions.

With the accession of Commodus, in 180, the Praetorian Guard returned to Rome. Tigidius Perennis (AD 182–185) and freedman Marcus Aurelius Cleander (AD 186–190) exercised considerable influence on the emperor. Perennis was killed by a delegation of 1,500 Lanciarii of the three legions of Britain which had come to complain about his interference in the affairs of the province. Cleander abused his influence to nominate and dismiss prefects.

In 188, Cleander obtained the joint command of the Guard with the two prefects. He ordered a massacre of civilians carried out by the equites singulares Augusti, which led to an arranged battle with the Urban Cohorts.

==== Severan dynasty ====
Commodus fell victim to a conspiracy aided by his Praetorian prefect Quintus Aemilius Laetus in 192. The new emperor Pertinax, who took part in the conspiracy, paid the Praetorians a premium of 3,000 denarii; however he was assassinated three months later, on 28 March 193, by a group of Guards due to his refusal to further increase the premium which had already been paid. The Praetorians then put the empire up to auction and Didius Julianus bought the title of emperor. However, the armies of the Danube chose instead the governor of Pannonia Superior, Septimius Severus, who besieged Rome and tricked the Praetorians when they came out unarmed. The Praetorian Guard was dissolved and replaced by men transferred from Septimius's army.

The new Guard of Septimius Severus made their mark against his rival Clodius Albinus at the Battle of Lyon in 197, and accompanied the emperor to the Orient from 197 to 202, then to Britannia from 208 until his death at York in 211.

Caracalla, son of Septimius Severus, lost favour with his troops by assassinating his own brother and co-emperor, Geta, immediately after his succession. Finally, in 217, while on campaign in the Orient, he was assassinated at the instigation of his prefect Macrinus.

After the elimination of the latter, the Praetorians opposed the new emperor Elagabalus, priest of the oriental cult of Elagabal, and replaced him by his 13-year-old cousin Severus Alexander in 222.

In this period the position of Praetorian prefect in Italy came increasingly to resemble a general administrative post, and there was a tendency to appoint jurists such as Papinian, who occupied the post from 203 until his elimination and execution at the ascent of Caracalla. Under Severus Alexander the Praetorian prefecture was held by the lawyer Ulpian until his assassination by the Praetorian Guard in the presence of the emperor himself.

==== 3rd century ====
In the spring of 238, under Maximinus Thrax, the bulk of the Praetorian Guard was employed on active service. Defended by only a small residual garrison, the Praetorian camp was attacked by a civilian crowd acting in support of senators and Gordian emperors in revolt against Maximinus Thrax. The failure of Maximinus Thrax to win the civil war against the contenders Gordian I and Gordian II led to his death at the hands of his own troops, including the Praetorians. The senatorial candidates for the throne, Pupienus and Balbinus, recalled the Praetorian Guard to Rome, only to find themselves under attack by the Praetorians. Both were killed on 29 July 238 and Gordian III triumphed.

After 238, literary and epigraphic sources dry up, and information on the Praetorian Guard becomes rare. In 249, the Praetorians assassinated Philippus II, son of the emperor Philip the Arab. In 272, in the reign of the emperor Aurelian, they took part in an expedition against Palmyra. In 284, Diocletian reduced the status of the Praetorians; they were no longer to be part of palace life, as Diocletian lived in Nicomedia, some 60 miles (100 km) from Byzantium in Asia Minor. Two new corps, the Ioviani and Herculiani (named after the gods Jove, or Jupiter, and Hercules, associated with the senior and junior emperor), replaced the Praetorians as the personal protectors of the emperors, a practice that remained intact with the Tetrarchy. In 297 they were in Africa with Maximian. By the time Diocletian retired on 1 May 305, their Castra Praetoria seems to have housed only a minor garrison of Rome.

==== Dissolution ====
During the early 4th century, Caesar Flavius Valerius Severus attempted to disband the Praetorian Guard on the orders of Galerius. In response, the Praetorians turned to Maxentius, the son of the retired emperor Maximian, and proclaimed him their emperor on 28 October 306. By 312, however, Constantine the Great marched on Rome with an army in order to eliminate Maxentius and gain control of the Western Roman Empire, leading to the Battle of the Milvian Bridge. Ultimately Constantine's army achieved a decisive victory against the Praetorians, whose emperor was killed during the fighting. With the death of Maxentius, Constantine definitively disbanded the remnants of the Praetorian Guard. The remaining soldiers were sent out to various corners of the empire, and the Castra Praetoria was dismantled in a grand gesture, inaugurating a new age in Roman history and ending that of the Praetorians.

=== Participation in wars ===
While campaigning, the Praetorians were the equal of any formation in the Roman army. On the death of Augustus in 14 AD, his successor, Tiberius, was faced with mutinies among both the Rhine and Pannonian legions. According to Tacitus, the Pannonian forces were dealt with by Tiberius' son Drusus, accompanied by two Praetorian cohorts, the Praetorian cavalry and some of the German bodyguard. The German mutiny was put down by Tiberius' nephew and adopted son Germanicus, his intended heir, who then led the legions and detachments of the Guard in an invasion of Germany over the next two years. The Guard saw much action in the Year of the Four Emperors in 69, fighting well for Otho at the first battle of Bedriacum. Under Domitian and Trajan, the guard took part in wars from Dacia to Mesopotamia, while with Marcus Aurelius, years were spent on the Danubian frontier during the Marcomannic Wars. Throughout the 3rd century, the Praetorians assisted the emperors in various campaigns.

=== Political role ===
The Praetorian Guard influenced and intervened in the imperial succession to name the new Caesar, which was a political decision that the unarmed Senate accepted, ratified, and proclaimed to the people of Rome. After the death of Sejanus, who was sacrificed for the donativum (imperial gift) promised by Tiberius, the Praetorians became exceptionally ambitious in their influence upon the politics of the Roman Empire. Either by volition or for a price, the Praetorian Guard would assassinate an emperor, bully the Praetorian prefects, or attack the Roman populace. In AD 41, conspirators from the senatorial class and from the Guard killed Emperor Caligula, his wife, and their daughter. Afterwards, the Praetorians installed Caligula's uncle Claudius upon the imperial throne of Rome, and challenged the Senate to oppose the Praetorian decision.

In AD 69, the Year of the Four Emperors, after assassinating the Emperor Galba, because he did not offer them a donatium, the Praetorians gave their allegiance to Otho, whom they named as the new Caesar of Rome. To ensure the loyalty of the Praetorian Guard, Emperor Otho granted the Praetorians the right to appoint their own prefects. After defeating Otho, Vitellius disbanded the Praetorians and established a new Guard composed of sixteen cohorts. In his war against Vitellius, Vespasian relied upon the disgruntled cohorts dismissed by Emperor Vitellius, and, as Emperor Vespasian, he reduced the Praetorian Guard to nine cohorts and ensured their political loyalty by appointing his son, Titus, as prefect of the Praetorians.

Despite their political power, the Praetorian Guard had no formal role in governing the Roman Empire. Often after an outrageous act of violence, revenge by the new ruler was forthcoming. In 193, Didius Julianus purchased the Empire from the Guard for a vast sum, when the Guard auctioned it off after killing Pertinax. Later that year Septimius Severus marched into Rome, disbanded the Guard and started a new formation from his own Pannonian legions. Unruly mobs in Rome often fought with the Praetorians in vicious street battles during Maximinus Thrax's reign.

In 271, Aurelian sailed east to destroy the power of Palmyra, Syria, with a force of legionary detachments, Praetorian cohorts, and other cavalry units, and easily defeated the Palmyrenes. This led to the orthodox view that Diocletian and his colleagues evolved the sacer comitatus (the field escort of the emperors). The sacer comitatus included field units that used a selection process and command structure modeled after the old Praetorian cohorts, but it was not of uniform composition and was much larger than a Praetorian cohort.

=== Organization ===
==== Leadership ====
Starting in the year 2 BC, the Praetorian prefect was the commanding officer of the Praetorian Guard (previously each cohort was independent and under the orders of a tribune of equestrian rank). This role (chief of all troops stationed in Rome), was in practice a key position of the Roman polity.

From Vespasian onwards the Praetorian prefecture was always held by an equestrian of the eques order. (Equestrians were traditionally that class of citizens who could equip themselves to serve in the Roman Army on horseback).

From the year 2 BC, the cohorts were under the control of two prefectures; however cohorts continued to be organized independently, each commanded by a tribune. Tribunes had as immediate subordinates ordinary Centurions, all of equal rank except for the trecenarius, the first and prime of all centurions of the Praetorian Cohorts, who commanded also the 300 speculatores, and with the exception of his second, the princeps castrorum.

From the second century the Praetorian prefect oversaw not only the Praetorian Cohorts but also the rest of the garrison of Rome, including the Cohortes urbanae ("urban cohorts") and the equites singulares Augusti, but not the Vigiles cohorts.

Following the dissolution of the Praetorian Cohorts by the emperor Constantine after he defeated them at the Battle of the Milvian Bridge in 312, the role of the Praetorian prefect in the Empire became purely administrative, ruling large territories (prefectures) comprising Roman dioceses (geographical subdivisions of the Roman Empire) in the name of the Emperor.

==== Size and composition ====
The Praetorian Cohorts were designated as Equitatae (cavalry) Turmae (troops) with centuries formed of infantry, initially of 500 men each.

In order not to alienate the population of Rome, while conserving Republican civilian traditions, the Praetorians did not wear their armor while in the heart of the city. Instead they often wore a formal toga, which distinguished them from civilians but remained in a respectable civilian attire, the mark of a Roman citizen. Augustus, conscious of risking the only military force present in the city, often avoided concentrating them and imposed this dress code.

From the reign of Tiberius, their camp was situated on the Quirinal Hill, outside Rome. In 26 AD, Sejanus, Praetorian prefect, and the favorite of emperor Tiberius, united the Urban Cohorts with nine Praetorian Cohorts, dispersed at that time throughout Italy, in one large camp situated beyond the Servian Wall, on the Esquiline Hill, the Castra Praetoria.

For the 2nd century, calculations from lists of significant demobilisations suggest an increase in size to nearly 1,500 men per cohort (perhaps a doubling of 800 (since Vespasian), probably organized in 20 centuries) under Commodus in year (187–188) or under Septimius Severus (193–211), which matches the probable numbers of effectives for Urban Cohorts during the time of Cassius Dio. These figures suggest an overall size for the Guard of 4,500–6,000 men under Augustus, 12,800 under Vitellius, 7,200 under Vespasian, 8,000 from Domitian until Commodus or Septimius Severus, and 15,000 later on.

At the beginning of the 2nd century, Italians made up 89% of the Praetorian Guard. Under Septimius Severus, recruitment evolved to authorize the inclusion of legionaries of the Roman army, as well as of the battle hardened Army of the Danube. Severus stationed his supporters with him in Rome, and the Praetorian Guards remained loyal to his choices.

==== Praetorian Cavalry ====
Initially each cohort included, as for a Roman legion, a cavalry detachment; this should not be confused with the equites singulares Augusti who appeared under the emperor Trajan. The Praetorian could become a cavalryman (Eques) after almost five years service in the infantry. These Praetorians remained listed in their Centuries of origin, but operated in a turma of 30 men each commanded by an Optio equitum.

There was probably one turma of cavalry for two centuries of infantry. Hence, three turmae per cohorts of the Augustan period, five per cohort in 100 CE–200 CE, and ten per cohort after 200 CE, with a vexillum (flag) as emblem for each turma.

==== Speculatores Augusti ====
The Speculatores Augusti were cavalrymen assigned to the same tasks as the Speculatores of the legions and the auxiliary units (messengers in charge of transmitting intelligence, and clandestine agents).

About 300 in total (30 per cohort), they formed a unit under the orders of the senior Centurion, the Trecenarius. Selected for their impressive physique, they were used by the Emperor for clandestine operations and tasks such as arrests, imprisonment, and executions.

One of their roles was to accompany the emperor on his foreign campaign journeys (a role which would later be handled by the Singulares/equites singulares Augusti). Claudius was in the habit of surrounding himself with Speculatores when attending dinners.

The close security protection detail of Galba, of Otho and the dynastic line of the Flavians appear to have been formed of Speculatores (who replaced the Imperial German Bodyguard disbanded by Galba).

Following the assassination of emperor Domitian, his successor Nerva was placed under the protection of Trajan, to counter possible revenge attempts and mutinies. Trajan was commander of the most important army of the time, that of the Army of Germania, and he nominated him as his heir. Accordingly, and following such an act, Trajan, aiming to reinforce his security detail in relation to the Speculatores who had remained loyal to Domitian, replaced them as close protection security detail with the Singulares/equites singulares Augusti (modelled on the Singulares of a provincial governor, a post held by Trajan). The some 300 Speculatores were reassigned by Trajan to the corps of Praetorian cohorts.

They were distinguished by a special (but unknown) style of boots, the Speculatoria Caliga (according to Suetonius) and they received special honorific diplomas in bronze at demobilization. They had their own Equestrian instructors (Exercitatores).

=== Service in the Praetorian Guard ===
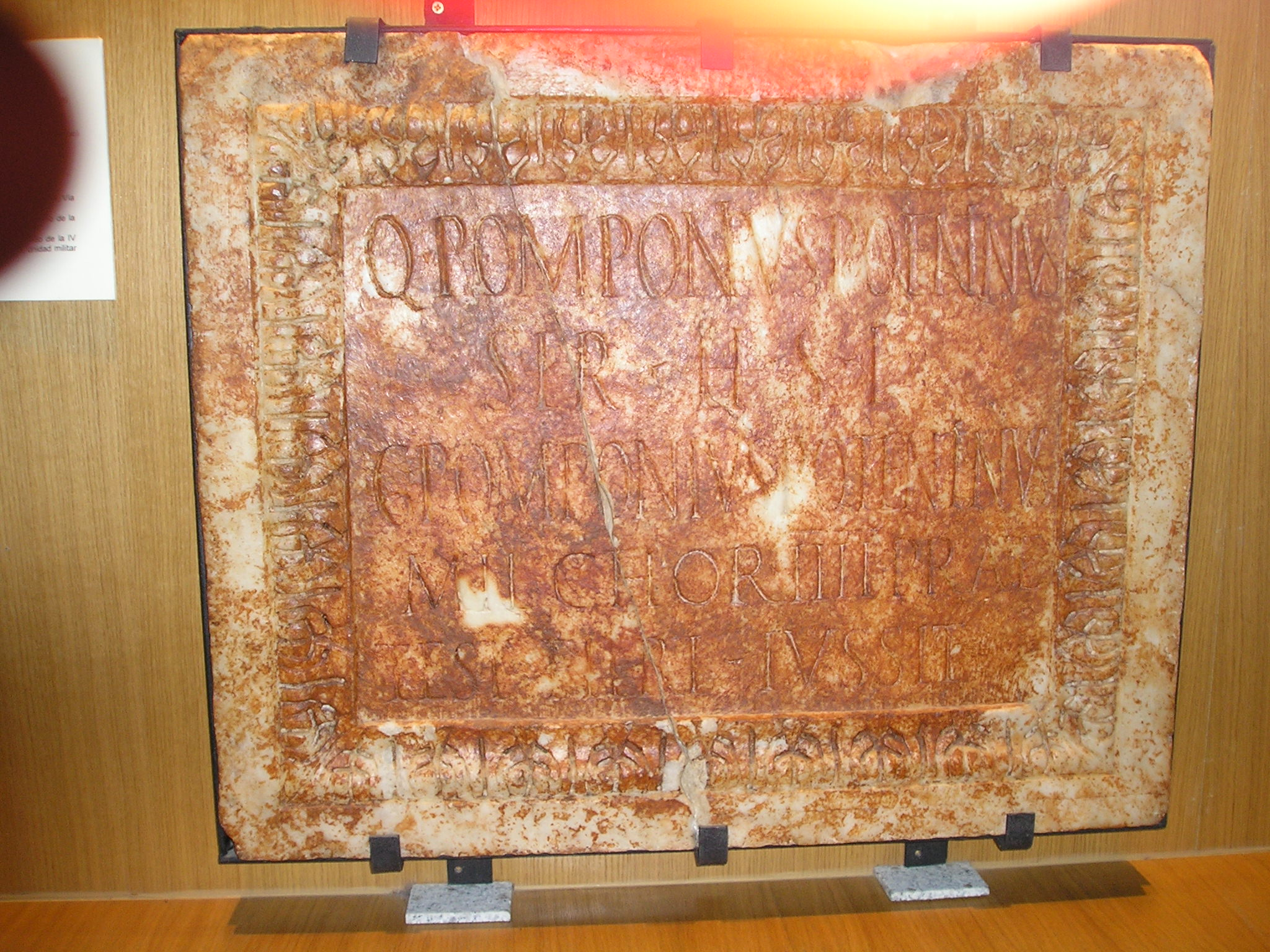
Funeral inscription of Quintus Pomponius Poeninus, soldier of the IV Praetorian Cohort

Originally, the Praetorian Guard was recruited from the populations of central Italy (Etruria, Umbria and Latium according to Tacitus). Recruits were between 15 and 32 years of age, compared to legionary recruits who ranged from 18 to 23 years of age. According to Cassius Dio, during the first two centuries AD and before the reform of Septimius Severus, the Praetorians were exclusively limited to Italy, Spain (Roman province), Macedonia and Noricum (current Austria and Slovenia).

Under the reign of Vitellius, and starting from Septimius Severus, men were transferred from the Urban Vigiles, Urban cohorts, and the various legions. This recent method and manner of recruitment at the corps of the legions became the normal procedure to recruit in the 3rd century after Septimius Severus dealt with the undisciplined Praetorians who assassinated Pertinax in 193, and replaced them with men from his own Danube legions.

At that time, the Praetorians represented the best soldiers from the legions (principally from Illyria). They were a group of elite of soldiers starting from the 3rd century, and not a category of socially privileged soldiers (such as the Italians at the time of Augustus). The Italians formed the base of the recruitment of the Legio II Parthica, a new legion created and stationed in Italy.

To be admitted to the Guard, a man had to be in good physical condition, have a good moral character, and come from a respectable family. In addition, he had to make use of all sorts of patronages available to him in order to obtain letters of recommendations from important leading figures in society. Once past the recruitment procedure he was designated as Probatus, and assigned as a Miles (soldier) to one of the centuries of a cohort. After two years, if he attracted the attention of his superiors by influence or merit, he could attain the post of Immunis (similar to corporal), perhaps as a commis (junior chief) at general headquarters or as a technician. This promotion exempted him from daily chores. After another two years he could be promoted to Principalis, with a double salary, in charge of delivering messages (Tesserarius) or as an assistant centurion (Optio) or standard bearer (Signifer) at the corps of the century; or, if literate and numerate, he could join the administrative staff of the prefect.

Only a few soldiers could attain the rank of Principalis; however those who did, during the course of their service, were designated Evocati Augusti by the emperor. This designation allowed them to be promoted to technical administrative posts, or instructors in Rome, or to a century in a legion, and accordingly extend their career. Certain principalis could at the end of their career be promoted to Centurion in the Guard; this would be the peak of his career. Anyone ambitious for further promotion would need to transfer to a legion.

The Military tribunes (Tribuni Militum) at the head of the cohorts were Roman cavalrymen. In contrast to many superior cadres of the Army, who originated from the Equestrian Order, these tribunes started their career in the ranks of the Guard and were promoted from the ranks in the hierarchy. Next after becoming Centurions, they had to serve for a period of one year as superior centurions in one or several legions before achieving the status of Primus pilus (the highest ranked Centurion in a legion). Upon return to Rome, they occupied successively the positions of Tribunes of the Vigiles, Tribune of the Urban Cohort and finally Tribune of the Guard.

Other leading paths towards the tribunate were possible, including service entirely made in the legions, attaining the rank of Primus pilus before departing to Rome. Nevertheless, all tribunes were combat veterans with extensive military experience. Each tribune served in Rome for one year, following which, a certain number of the men would retire.

A few of them, ranking placement at the top of the hierarchy, could obtain a second term as Primus Pilus and advance towards the superior echelons of the equestrian career, possibly becoming the Praetorian prefect.

The majority of the prefects, however, were ordinary men of the equestrian rank by birth. The men who attained the command of the Guard following year 2 BC were equites with an elevated seniority, classifying right behind the prefect of Egypt. Starting from Vespasian, whose son, Titus was himself a Praetorian prefect, they were ranked first.

=== Equipment and traditions ===
The Praetorian Guard, like all legionnaires, disposed of various equipment to execute different missions. More particularly as bodyguard, escort or reserve military force, they housed adaptable equipment for each function.

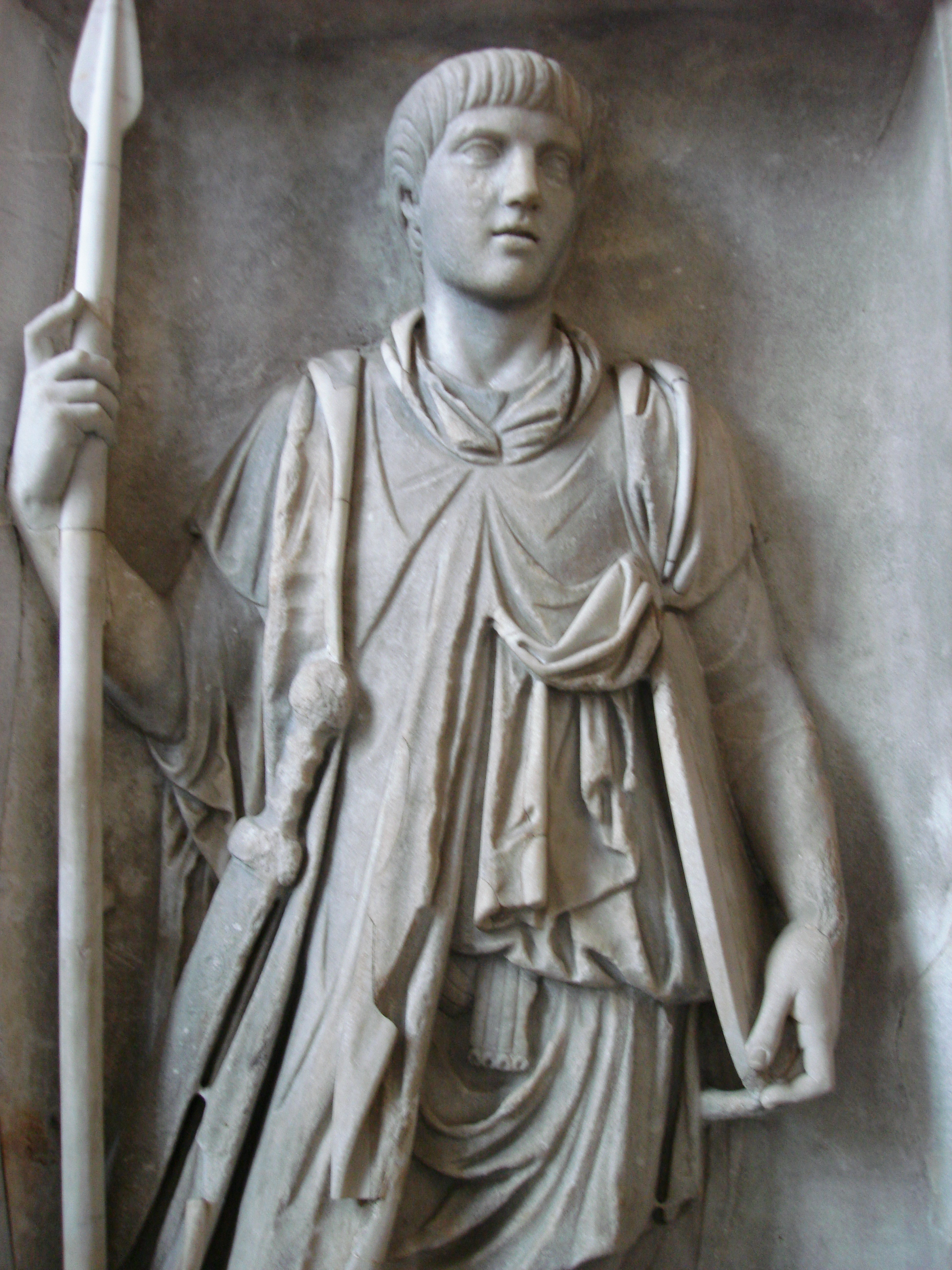
A Praetorian soldier armed with standard Roman weapon in 2nd century AD

For heavy packed combat infantry lines (Triplex Acies System), they mounted helmets, armor (Lorica segmentata, Lorica hamata, Lorica squamata specially in the 2nd and 3rd centuries), heavy colorful shields (scuta), heavy javelins (pila), and later even long spears and lighter javelins (hasta, lancea).

Praetorian Guard helmets included tall Galea with elaborate detail worked into the metal. Shields were ovoid and more robust compared with the regular rectangular shape sometimes used by the legions. Each legion had its own emblem displayed on its Scutum (shield) and the Praetorian Guard were probably the only unit to include additional insignia on their shields. Each cohort had their own version of Praetorian insignia. Praetorian Guard units could wear lion skin capes and their colours were so decorated with awards, that the men had difficulty in carrying them on long marches.

The Praetorian Guard colours included the winged goddess of victory.

For escorts, the oval shields and lances replaced the scuta and pila. Missions in Rome at the heart of the city in principle were forbidden to soldiers, so they wore a toga.

The Praetorian Guard, like all legionaries, shared similar insignia, mainly on their shields. Praetorian Guard shields included wings and thunderbolts, referring to Jupiter, and also uniquely included scorpions, stars and crescents.

== See also ==
- Janissary - bodyguard corps composed of abducted Eastern Orthodox Christians from the Balkans and Catholics from central Europe who had been forcibly converted to Sunni Islam, employed to guard the sultans of the Ottoman Empire
- Praetorianism
- Pushtigban - bodyguard corps of the Sassanian Empire
- Scholae Palatinae - replacement of the Praetorian guards
- Excubitors - replacement of the Scholae Palatinae
- Varangian Guard - bodyguard corps composed of Vikings, Anglo-Saxons & Christianised Rus mercenaries employed to guard the emperor of the Byzantine Empire
- Equites
- Hippeis

== Bibliography ==
- Cowan, Ross (2014). Roman Guardsman 62 BC-AD 324. Oxford: Osprey. ISBN 9781782009252.
- Goldsworthy, Adrian (2007). The Complete Roman Army. London: Thames & Hudson. ISBN 978-0-500-05124-5.
- Sandra J. Bingham, The Praetorian Guard: A History of Rome's Elite Special Forces (Waco 2012). Reviewed here.
- de la Bédoyère, Guy (2017). Praetorian: The Rise and Fall of Rome's Imperial Bodyguard. Yale: Yale University Press. ISBN 978-0-300-21895-4.
- Marcel Durry, Les cohortes prétoriennes (Bibliothèque des Écoles françaises d'Athènes et de Rome, 146), Paris, De Boccard, 1938
- Lawrence Keppie, "The Praetorian Guard Before Sejanus", Athenaeum 84 (1996), 101–124, Legions and Veterans (Stuttgart 2000), 99–122 & addenda at 319–320
- L. Passerini, Le Coorti Pretorie (Rome 1939)
- Rankov, Boris (2004). The Praetorian Guard. Oxford: Osprey. ISBN 1855323613.
- M.P. Speidel, "Les prétoriens de Maxence", Mélanges de l'École française de Rome, Antiquité 100 (1988), 183–188
- M.P. Speidel, "Maxentius' Praetorians" in Roman Army Studies II (Stuttgart 1992), 385–389 – a revised English version of Speidel 1988
- Speidel, M.P. (1994). Riding for Caesar. Cambridge.
