= Exploratores =

Ancient Roman military scouts and reconnaissance units

In the Roman army of the Republic and Empire, the exploratores (singular explorator, "scout" or "one who explores/investigates", from explorare) were soldiers and units tasked with open, long-range reconnaissance, terrain surveying, and frontier patrol. Drawn chiefly from auxiliary cavalry (auxilia), and later organized into their own permanent units, exploratores functioned as the tactical "eyes and ears" of Roman armies on campaign and along the frontiers.

== Etymology and early use ==
The term derives from explorare, "to scout, investigate, examine". References to reconnaissance parties described as exploratores appear in Republican-era authors; Livy, for instance, uses the word alongside speculatores in describing agents sent into the camp of the Numidian king Syphax, suggesting the two terms were not always sharply distinguished by ancient writers. By the late Republic, Caesar made regular use of mounted exploratores during the Gallic Wars; in 58 BC, while marching from Vesontio (modern Besançon) to confront Ariovistus and the Suebi, reports carried back by exploratores and local sources exaggerating the size and ferocity of the German warriors caused a wave of panic through his army.

== Distinctions from speculatores ==
Although Roman authors occasionally used the terms loosely, exploratores were functionally distinct from speculatores:

- Tactical scope: Exploratores operated openly and usually in groups, screening a marching army or patrolling frontier zones, whereas speculatores more often worked singly or in disguise, engaged in covert observation, and — particularly under the Empire — in courier, bodyguard, and law-enforcement duties attached to a commander's staff.
- Unit structure: Exploratores were eventually organized into dedicated auxiliary formations (numeri exploratorum), while speculatores remained small details attached to legionary or Praetorian Guard staffs rather than standing field units.

== Operational duties ==
=== Route reconnaissance ===
On campaign, mounted exploratores rode ahead of and alongside the main column to screen it against ambush, surveying roads, passes, and river crossings before the heavier infantry entered constricted terrain. A well-known instance comes from AD 69, during the civil war between Vitellius and Vespasian: the Flavian commander Marcus Antonius Primus pushed a strong cavalry force toward Cremona, with exploratores operating some distance ahead of it, and it was their advance warning that alerted Primus to the approach of Vitellian forces in time to prepare for battle.

=== Camp reconnaissance ===
Exploratores also assisted in identifying ground suitable for a marching camp (castra), assessing water sources, forage for cavalry mounts, and defensible high ground ahead of the army's arrival.

=== Frontier units (numeri exploratorum) ===
From the later 2nd century AD, permanent auxiliary formations bearing the title exploratores or organized as numeri exploratorum were stationed on several frontiers, generally named for their base fort:

- Roman Britain: units are epigraphically attested at Habitancum (Risingham, Exploratores Habitancenses, first attested AD 213) and at Bremenium (High Rochester, Numerus Exploratorum Bremeniensium, attested under Gordian III, AD 238–244), with further references at Vindolanda, Segedunum, and Brocolitia; the Notitia Dignitatum also lists numeri exploratorum at Lavatris (Bowes) and Portus Adurni (Portchester).
- Germania: units are attested such as the Exploratores Batavi, Exploratores Divitienses, Exploratores Germanici, and Exploratores Nemaningenses.
- Further units are recorded in North Africa (Exploratores Pomarienses) and elsewhere along the Danube frontier.

These frontier exploratores watched neighbouring tribal territory, guarded approach routes into provincial territory, and reported on movements beyond the limes.

== See also ==
- Speculatores
- Frumentarii
- Auxilia
- Castra
- Areani

== Bibliography ==
- Austin, N. J. E.; Rankov, N. B. (1995). Exploratio: Military Intelligence and Security in the Roman World. Routledge. ISBN 978-0-415-04945-0.
- Sheldon, Rose Mary (2004). Intelligence Activities in Ancient Rome: Trust in the Gods but Verify. Routledge. ISBN 978-1-135-77107-2.
- Ezov, Amiram (1996). "The "Missing Dimension" of C. Julius Caesar". Historia: Zeitschrift für Alte Geschichte. 45 (1): 64–94. JSTOR 4436407.
- Rankov, N. B. (1990). "Frumentarii and the Provincial Officia". Zeitschrift für Papyrologie und Epigraphik. 80: 176–182.
