= Speculatores =

Ancient Roman reconnaissance and secret police agency

The speculatores (singular speculator, meaning "scout" or "observer"), also known in the imperial guard as the speculatores augusti, were an elite specialized reconnaissance, intelligence, and security force within the Roman military. Operating both within individual legions and attached to high-ranking commanders, the speculatores served as covert scouts, couriers, political police, executioners, and imperial bodyguards. While often operating alongside open cavalry scouts (exploratores), the speculatores specialized in covert reconnaissance, political surveillance, couriering, extrajudicial arrests, and imperial security.

== History and organization ==
Reconnaissance units similar to the speculatores trace their roots back to classical Greek scouting practices and early Roman operations during the Samnite Wars and Roman-Aequian wars.

Under the military reforms of Augustus in the late 1st century BC, the organization was formalized across the army:

- Legionary Scouts: Each legion was assigned 10 speculatores (approximately one per cohort) who operated as cavalry scouts, couriers, and intelligence gatherers.
- Imperial Guard (Speculatores Augusti): A select corps of around 300 speculatores was stationed in Rome at the Castra Peregrina and attached directly to the Praetorian Guard as personal bodyguards to the emperor.

Selected for their exceptional loyalty, discretion, and physical prowess, the speculatores were trained by a specialized officer known as a centurio exercitator in equestrianism, swordsmanship, and escort tactics. Command of the corps was overseen by senior centurions, including the centurio speculatorum and centurio trecenarius.

== Duties and operations ==
The speculatores operated flexibly in small numbers, often individually or in pairs:

- Reconnaissance and espionage: Scouting ahead of advancing legions, gathering local intelligence, and carrying vital military dispatches.
- Imperial bodyguards and escorts: Clearing crowds along imperial parade routes and protecting the emperor using the shafts of their lanceae (short spears) to maintain order.
- Political Police and Execution: Acting as imperial executioners, interrogators, and clandestine assassins against political opponents.

Because of their role in political surveillance, extrajudicial arrests, and secret executions, the speculatores were deeply feared and despised by the Roman populace. During the 2nd century AD, their internal security and domestic espionage duties were gradually taken over by the frumentarii.

== Field reconnaissance and intelligence gathering ==
While the speculatores augusti served as political bodyguards and urban intelligence agents in Rome, speculatores attached to field legions played a crucial role during military campaigns. Unlike regular cavalry patrols, their field operations relied on stealth, infiltration, and individual initiative.

=== Infiltration and tactical reconnaissance ===
During active marches, speculatores operated far beyond Roman lines in small teams or individually. Unlike mounted patrols (exploratores), speculatores frequently operated in local or non-Roman dress to blend into surrounding populations. Their primary goal was not merely to locate enemy formations, but to assess enemy intentions, morale, and leadership dynamics by monitoring local roads, taverns, and encampments.

=== Camp selection and perimeter security ===
Before the arrival of a marching column at a designated stopping point, a detachment of speculatores advanced ahead of the main body alongside military surveyors (mensores). While surveyors laid out the perimeter of the marching camp (castra), speculatores established concealed observation posts on nearby high ground to prevent ambushes while the unarmored legionaries dug fortifications.

=== HUMINT and interrogation ===
Speculatores managed Human Intelligence (HUMINT) operations for legionary commanders. They were tasked with conducting the initial interrogations of enemy deserters (perfugae) and prisoners of war (captivi), cross-checking their statements against reports from forward scouts. Additionally, their mobility and high level of training made them the primary dispatches for secure, long-distance communication between separate marching columns.

== See also ==
- Frumentarii
- Agentes in rebus
- Castra Peregrina
- Praetorian Guard
- Areani

== Bibliography ==
- Bunson, Matthew (2014). Encyclopedia of the Roman Empire. Infobase Publishing. ISBN 978-1-4381-1027-1.
- Busch, Alexandra (2007). 'Militia in Urbe': The Military Presence in Rome. Brill. ISBN 978-90-04-16044-6.
- Cairo, Giambattista (2015), "Non-Commissioned Officers, NCOs: Republic", The Encyclopedia of the Roman Army, John Wiley & Sons
- Cowan, Ross (2014). Roman Guardsman 62 BC–AD 324. Osprey Publishing. ISBN 978-1-78200-927-6.
- Fuhrmann, Christopher J. (2011). Policing the Roman Empire: Soldiers, Administration, and Public Order. Oxford University Press. ISBN 978-0-19-973784-0.
- Golding, F. Campbell (1951). "III. The Radiological Diagnosis of the Reticuloses". The British Journal of Radiology. 24 (285): 478–485. doi:10.1259/0007-1285-24-285-478.
- Rankov, Boris (1994). The Praetorian Guard. Osprey Publishing. ISBN 978-1-85532-361-2.
- Sheldon, Rose Mary (2004). Intelligence Activities in Ancient Rome: Trust in the Gods but Verify. Routledge. ISBN 978-1-135-77107-2.
- Speidel, Michael P. (2002). Riding for Caesar: The Roman Emperor's Horseguard. Routledge. ISBN 978-1-135-78254-2.
