= Mesangylon =

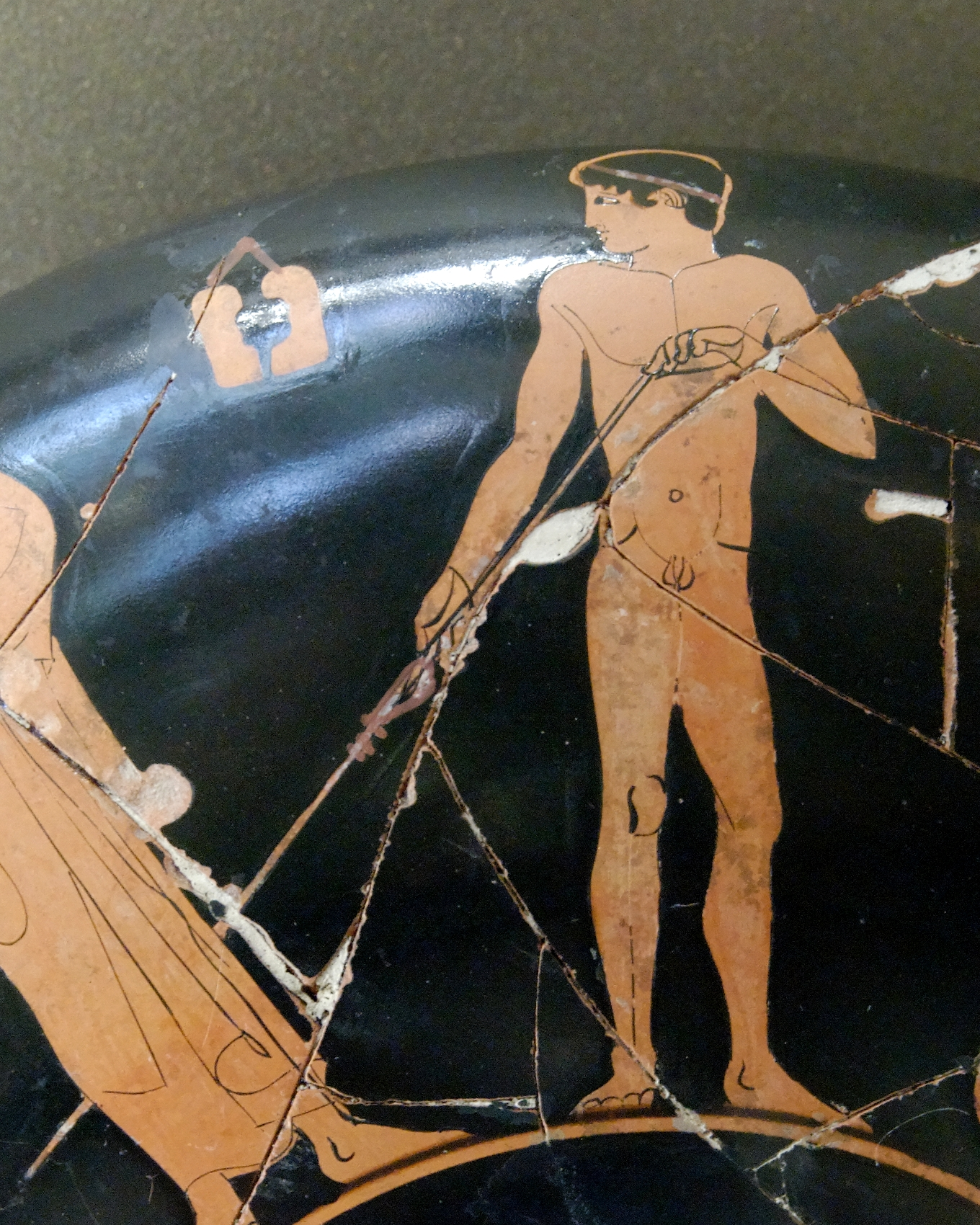
Athlete with a mesangylon in his right hand

The mesangylon (Greek: μεσάγκυλον) was a javelin with a strap (Greek: ἀγκύλη) for throwing it by. Its name is attested, among others, in the works of Euripides, Polybius and Arrian. It is one of the weapons used in Alexander's experimental phalanx.
