= Hasta (spear) =

Weapon used by early Roman legionaries

The hasta (pl.: hastae) was the spear carried by early Roman legionaries, for which the Roman soldiers known as hastati were named. In later republican times, the hastati were re-armed with pila and gladii, and the hasta was only retained by the triarii. The hasta would also be reintroduced in the Late Roman army in conjunction with the spatha.

Unlike the pilum, verutum and lancea, the hasta was not thrown, but used for thrusting. It was about 2.4 metres (7.9 ft) in length, with a shaft generally made from ash, while the head was of iron.

Hasta also referred to a spear that was a gymnastic weapon. The hasta praepilata was a spear with its point either covered by a ball or muffled. This type of spear was used by soldiers during training.

== Hasta pura ==
The hasta pura was a spear used in the Roman army as a military decoration for a soldier that distinguished himself in battle.

== Symbolic hastae ==
=== Hasta caelibaris ===
The hasta caelibaris ("celibate spear") was used during weddings to dress the bride's hair, like a ritual hairpin.

=== Hasta pampina ===
The hasta pampina was another name for the thyrsus of Bacchus, with the point of the spear was buried in vine leaves.

=== Hasta publica ===
A hasta publica was a spear used to convey that a public auction was taking place. Hence, an auction room was called a hastarium.

=== Hasta graminea ===
The hasta graminea was a spear made of an Indian reed that was used in statues of Minerva.

== Post-Roman era ==
The loanwords of Latin word hasta still exists in some languages used in regions that were previously part of the Roman Empire. For example, it is used French with the spelling haste and, and Italian and Spanish with the spelling asta. Other languages also used a modified form or meaning such as Albanian (heshtë, "spear").

== See also ==
- Roman military personal equipment
