= Verutum =

Type of javelin used by the Roman army

The verutum, plural veruta (Latin: spit), was a short javelin used in the Roman army. This javelin was used by the velites for skirmishing purposes, unlike the heavier pilum, which was used by the hastati and principes for weakening the enemy before advancing into close combat. The shafts were about 1.1 metres (3 ft 7 in) long, substantially shorter than the 2-metre (6 ft 7 in) pilum, and the point measured about 13 centimetres (5 in) long. The verutum had either an iron shank like the pilum or a tapering metal head. It was sometimes thrown with the aid of a throwing strap, or amentum.

The verutum was probably adopted from the Samnites and the Volsci but there is not enough proof for that. During the 3rd and 2nd centuries BC, Roman light infantry (velites) would carry seven veruta into combat. It proved to be quite an effective weapon, even against war elephants as proven in the battle of Zama. In the late 2nd century BC, the verutum was taken out of service along with the veles, but the javelin was taken back into the legionary arsenal during the Late Empire.

== See also ==
- Javelin § Ancient Rome
- Polearm
- Lancea (weapon)
- Spiculum
- Roman military personal equipment
