= Angon =

Type of javelin

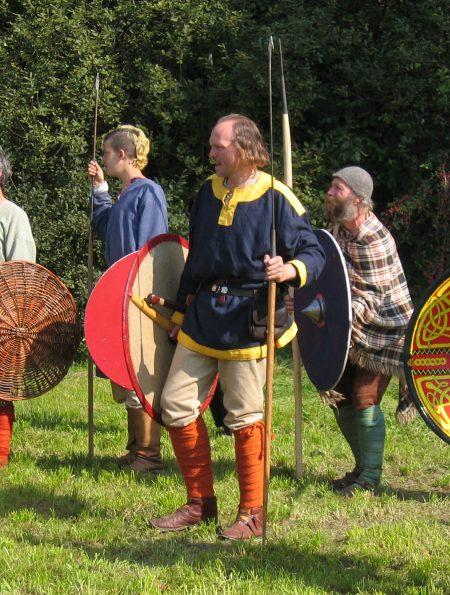
Reenactor with angon

The angon (Medieval Greek ἄγγων, Old High German ango, Old English anga "hook, point, spike") is a type of javelin that was used during the Early Middle Ages by the Anglo-Saxons, Franks, Goths, and other Germanic peoples. It was similar to, and probably derived from, the pilum used by the Roman army and had a barbed head and long narrow socket or shank made of iron mounted on a wooden haft.

It was rare on the battlefield, despite the claim by the Greek historian Agathias, being found mostly in the grave goods of the wealthy. The Fragmentary Chronicle of Saragossa credits an ango with killing King Amalaric of the Visigoths. By the 7th century it had ceased to be used. It also went out of fashion, together with other forms of throwing spears and javelins, in Francia, by the early 7th century.

They are found in abundance in war graves in Illerup-Ådal, Denmark. They are also quite common in Norwegian graves from the Migration Era. In Finland, a local version of the weapon was popular during the Early Middle Ages.

Although not very frequent in the Baltic countries, examples have also been found at various sites in Estonia, including burial sites at Sõrve and Hinniala.

== Description ==
Evidence for the length of insular Anglo-Saxon spears is limited, but based on grave finds it has been estimated that they ranged in length from 1.6 to 2.8 m (5 ft 3 in to 9 ft 2 in), compared to continental examples found at Nydam Mose in Denmark which range from 2.3 to 3 m (7 ft 7 in to 9 ft 10 in) long. Although shorter and lighter spears with smaller heads were generally preferred for use as javelins, an exception was the barbed angon, one of which was found at Abingdon with a head measuring 52.5 cm (20.7 in). The barbs were designed to lodge in an opponent's shield (or body) so that it could not be removed and the long iron shank prevented the head from being cut from the shaft. The angon was likely designed to disable enemy shields, thus leaving combatants vulnerable, and disrupting enemy formations. The shaft may sometimes have been decorated or painted, and iron or bronze rings were sometimes fitted onto it which may have marked the center of balance and thus the best place to hold the weapon.

== Use ==
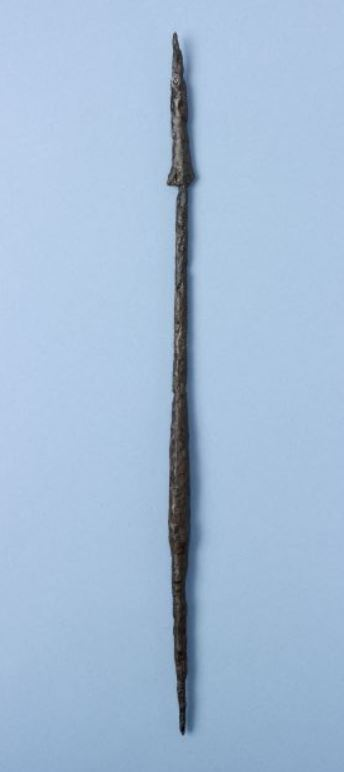
Finnish Angon found from Urjala dated to 6th–9th Century.

Before the battle lines joined and warriors engaged in hand-to-hand combat, they would attempt to thin the enemy ranks with ranged weapons. This would begin with archery, followed by an exchange of javelins and throwing axes before closing. The scholar Agathias recorded the use of angons by Frankish warriors at the Battle of Casilinum in 554:

Suppose a Frank throws his angon in an engagement. If the spear strikes a man anywhere the point will penetrate, and neither the wounded man nor anyone else can easily pull it out because the barbs that pierce the flesh hold it in and cause terrible pain, so that even if the enemy is not fatally hit he still dies as a result. And if it sticks in the shield, it fixes in it at once and is carried around with it, the butt dragging on the ground. The man who has been hit cannot pull out the spear because the barbs have gone in, and he cannot cut it off because of the iron that covers the shaft. When Frank sees this he quickly treads on it with his foot, stepping on the ferrule [iron finial on the butt of a spear or other pole weapon] and forcing the shield downwards so that the man's hand is loosened and his head and breast bared. Then, taking him unprotected, he kills him easily either cleaving his head with an axe or piercing his throat with another spear.

The poem recording the Battle of Maldon in Essex, England, in 991 AD, describes an encounter between the earl Byrhtnoth and a group of Norsemen in which an exchange of javelins is made before the warriors draw their swords and engage in close combat.

The maximum effective range of the angon and other javelins was probably 12 to 15 m (40 to 50 ft) depending on the length and weight of the weapon and the skill of the thrower. It is not known to have been used in war beyond the 7th century, but during the 16th century it was used sporadically for hunting.

== See also ==
- Anglo-Saxon warfare
- Shield wall
- Halberd
