= Pilum =

Type of javelin used by the Roman army

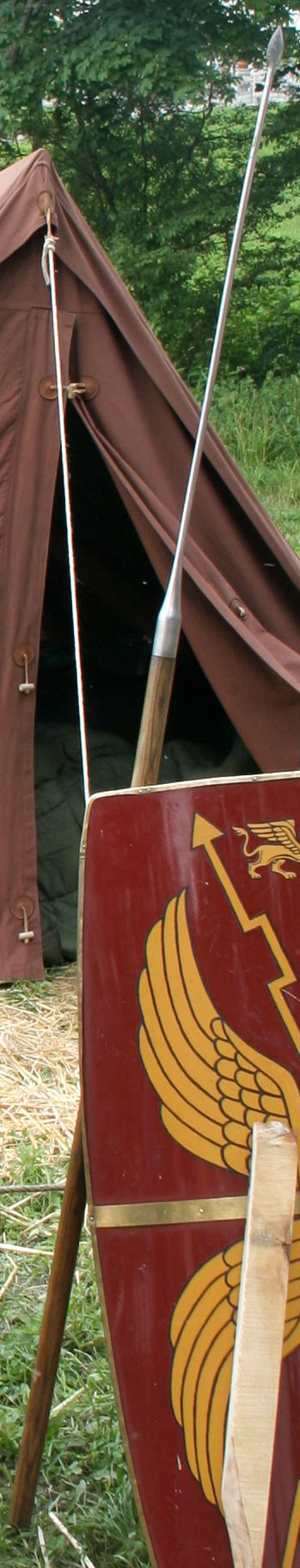
Pilum

The pilum (Latin: [ˈpiːɫʊ̃]; pl.: pila) was a javelin commonly used by the Roman army in ancient times. It was generally about 2 m (6 ft 7 in) long overall, consisting of an iron shank about 7 mm (0.28 in) in diameter and 600 mm (24 in) long with a pyramidal

== History ==
The pilum may have originated from an Italic tribe known as the Samnites. It also may have been influenced by Celtiberian and Etruscan weapons. The pilum may have derived from a Celtiberian weapon known as the falarica. Archaeological excavations have disclosed pila in tombs at the Etruscan city of Tarquinia. The oldest finds of pila are from the Etruscan settlements of Vulci and Talamone. The first identified written reference to the pilum comes from The Histories of Polybius. According to Polybius, more heavily armed Roman military soldiers used a spear called the hyssoí. This may have been the pilum. The precursor to the pilum was the hasta. It is unclear how soon it was replaced by the pilum. Polybius mentioned that it was an important contributor to the Roman victory at the Battle of Telamon in 225 BC.

A socketed pilum head measuring 295 mm (11.6 in) in length was discovered in the Cave of the Swords, a refuge cave in the Judaean Desert near Ein Gedi. Its deliberate concealment in a remote crevice suggests it may have been removed from a battlefield or taken as booty by a Jewish rebel—possibly for reuse—most likely during the Bar Kokhba revolt (132–136 AD).

== Design ==
A pilum had a total weight between 1 and 2.5 kg (2 and 5 lb), with the versions produced during the earlier Republic being slightly heavier than those produced in the later Empire.

The weapon had a hard pyramidal tip, but the shank was sometimes made of softer iron. The softness could cause the shank to bend after impact, thus rendering the weapon useless to the enemy. According to Davide Antonio Secci, the pilum was not meant to bend on impact, but instead was meant to break. If a pilum struck a shield, it might embed itself, and the bending of the shank would force the enemy to discard his shield as unusable without removing the pilum, or carry around the shield burdened by the weight of the pilum. Even if the shank did not bend, the pyramidal tip still made it difficult to pull out. Many cases occurred, though, in which the whole shank was hardened, making the pilum more suitable as a close-quarters melee weapon and also making it usable by enemy soldiers.

Although the bending of its shank is commonly seen as an integral part of the weapon's design and as an intentional feature, little evidence suggests that. The most commonly found artifacts suggest that the pilum was constructed to use the weight of the weapon to cause damage, most likely to be able to impale through armour and reach the enemy soldier's body. The combination of the weapon's weight and the aforementioned pyramidal tip (the design of which was seen in the Middle Ages in the form of bodkin arrow tips), made the pilum a formidable armour-piercing weapon. If the weapon was meant to be used against armour and to use its mass (as opposed to its speed) to cause damage, the bending of the shank seems to be a beneficial result of its intended use, which is to pierce through layers of armour. That the pilum needed to pierce layers of armour (through the shield, into body armour and past clothing) necessitated a lengthy shank, which was prone to bending. M.C. Bishop wrote that the momentum of the pilum caused the shank to bend upon impact, and although unintended, that proved a useful characteristic of the weapon. However, a newer work by M. C. Bishop states that pila are "unlikely to bend under their own weight when thrown and striking a target or ground"; rather, human intervention such as improper removal of a pilum stuck in a target is responsible in some way, and Caesar's writings should be interpreted as the pilum bending when soldiers tried to remove them.

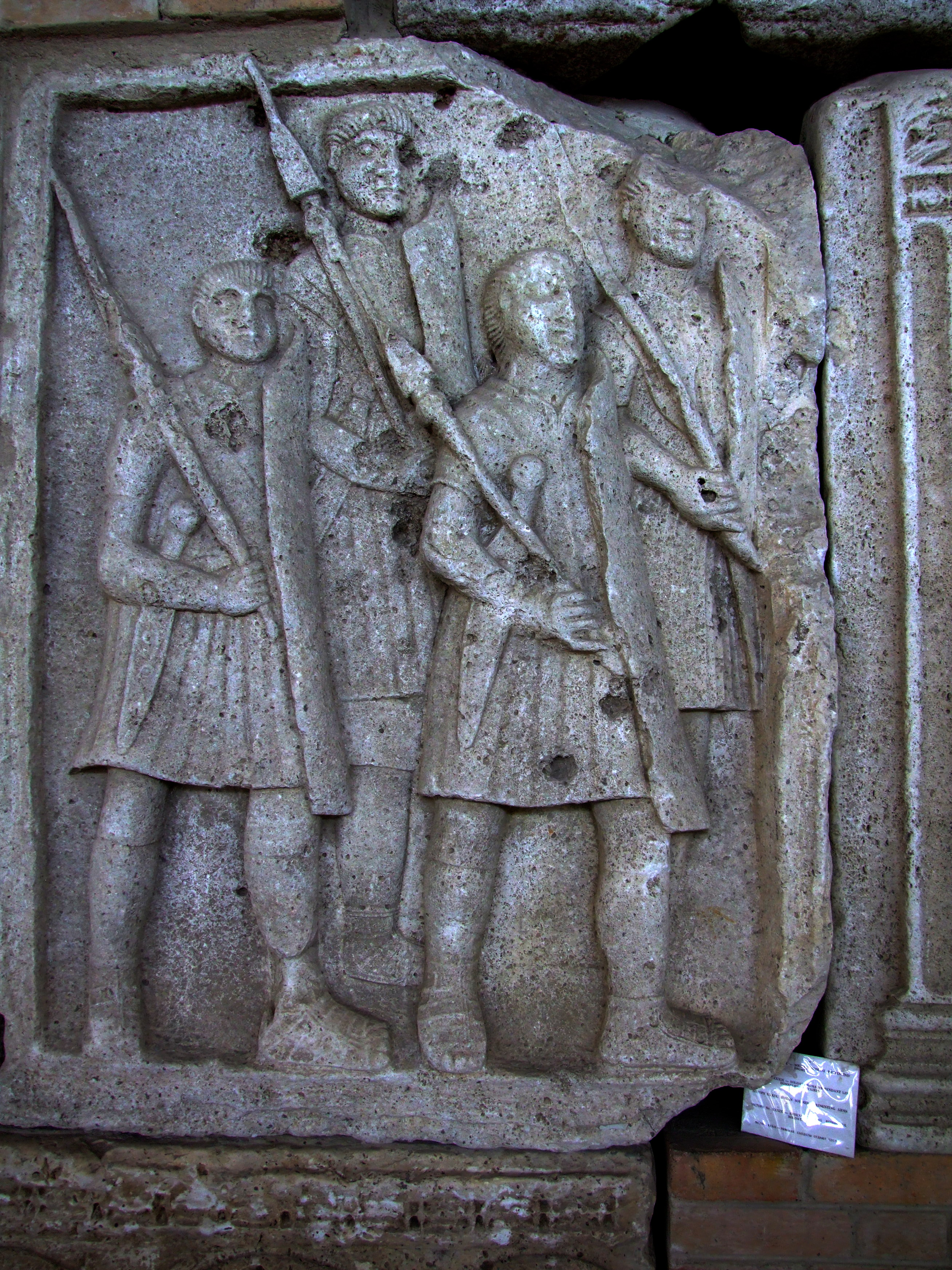
Legionaries carrying pila, as depicted on the Tropaeum Traiani

Since the pyramidal tip of a pilum was wider than the rest of the shank, once it had penetrated a shield, it left behind a hole larger than the rest of the shank, and it could move through the shield with little resistance, stabbing the soldier behind. The length of the shank and its depth of penetration also made pulling it out of a shield more difficult, even if it failed to bend. If the bearer of the shield was charging and a pilum penetrated the shield, the end of the heavy shaft of the pilum would hit the ground, holding the shield in place. Some pila had a spike on the end of the shaft, which made it easier to dig into the ground.

The two versions of pila are heavy and light. Pictorial evidence suggests that some versions of the weapon were weighted by a lead ball to increase penetrative power, but archaeological specimens of that design variant are not (so far) known. Recent experiments have shown pila to have a range around 33 m (110 ft), although the effective range is up to 15–20 m (50–65 ft). The earliest known examples of heavy pila have barbed heads and their tangs have a figure-eight shape.

Romans also used the pilum as a melee weapon in close-quarters combat. Note pictorial depictions from the Tropaeum Traiani monument, descriptions of Caesar's troops using javelins as pikes against the Gauls in Caesar's Gallic War, Book VII, and descriptions of Caesar's men using javelins to stab at Pompey's cavalry in Plutarch's Life of Caesar.

The angon was a similar weapon used in late Roman and post-Roman times.

The origin of the design of the pilum is a matter of contention. Arguments have been proposed which suggest that the design stemmed from ancient Italian tribes or from the Iberian Peninsula. Considering that two versions of the pilum are known (the heavy and the light), the Roman pilum may be descended from two different weapons, perhaps from different cultural groups. The two weapons designs may have coalesced into the form of the typical Roman pilum as it is known today.

== Tactics ==
Legionaries of the late Republic and early Empire often carried two pila, with one sometimes being lighter than the other. Standard tactics called for Roman soldiers to throw one of them (both if time permitted) at the enemy, just before charging to engage with the gladius; however, Alexander Zhmodikov has argued that the Roman infantry could use pila at any stage in the fighting. Zhmodikov has also argued that Roman battle tactics sometimes consisted of exchanging projectile weapons such as the pilum. Sam Koon argues against the idea that Roman tactics primarily consisted of projectile combat.

The effect of the pilum throw was to disrupt the enemy formation by attrition and by causing gaps to appear in any protective shield wall. The design of the pilum's tip is such that once wedged inside a shield, it is difficult to remove; a shield thus penetrated by a pilum became very awkward to wield, and was usually discarded. This resulted in the aforementioned gaps in the protective shield wall, which could then favour the short gladius in tight hand-to-hand mêlées.

Pila could also be used in hand-to-hand combat; one documented instance of this occurred at the Siege of Alesia, and another during Mark Antony's Parthian campaign. Additionally, pila could be employed as a thrusting implement and a barrier against cavalry charges. (Note: Arrian's Array against the Alans. "And the front four ranks of the formation must be of spearmen, whose spearpoints end in thin iron shanks. And the foremost of them should hold them at the ready, in order that when the enemies come near them, they can thrust the iron points of the spears at the breast of the horses in particular. Those standing in second, third and fourth rank of the formation must hold their spears ready for thrusting if possible, wounding the horses and killing the horsemen and put the rider out of action with the spear stuck in their heavy body armour and the iron point bent because of the softness. The following ranks should be of the javelineers."Dorst, Sander van. "Arrian's Array against the Alans".) Some pila had small hand-guards, to protect the wielder if he intended to use it as a mêlée weapon, but apparently this was not common.

== Vegetius' commentary ==
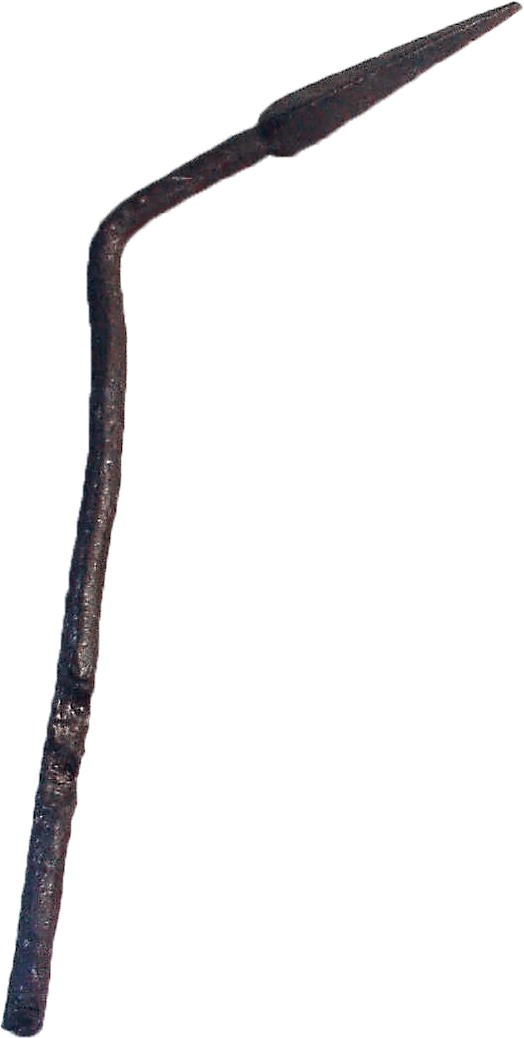
Bent pilum shank

The Roman writer Vegetius, in his work De re militari, wrote:

As to the missile weapons of the infantry, they were javelins headed with a triangular sharp iron, eleven inches [279 mm] or a foot long, and were called piles. When once fixed in the shield it was impossible to draw them out, and when thrown with force and skill, they penetrated the cuirass without difficulty.

And later in the same work:

They had likewise two other javelins, the largest of which was composed of a staff five feet and a half long and a triangular head of iron nine inches [230 mm] long. This was formerly called the pilum, but now it is known by the name of spiculum. The soldiers were particularly exercised in the use of this weapon, because when thrown with force and skill it often penetrated the shields of the foot and the cuirasses of the horse.

Arguably, a short iron shaft has very few confirmations from archaeology. Vegetius wrote about a one-foot iron shaft because at his time, the pilum had disappeared and been replaced by similar shorter weapons such as the plumbata and spiculum.

== Results of experimental archaeology ==
Due in part to experimental archaeology, the design of the pilum is believed to have evolved to be armour-piercing; the pyramidal head would punch a small hole through an enemy shield, allowing the thin shank to pass through and penetrate far enough to wound the man behind it. The thick wooden shaft provided the weight behind the punch.

In one description, one of the two iron nails that held the iron shaft in place was replaced with a weak wooden pin that would break on impact, causing the shaft to twist sideways. Gaius Marius is sometimes given credit for that modification. Archaeological evidence from the 80s BC through to the early imperial era show that this redesign was not adopted.

== Gallery ==
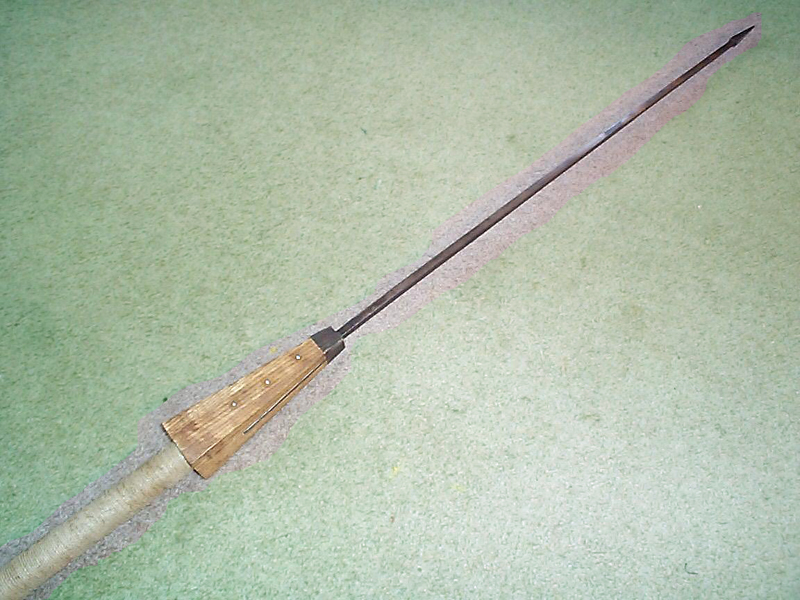
Reconstruction of a post-Marian pilum

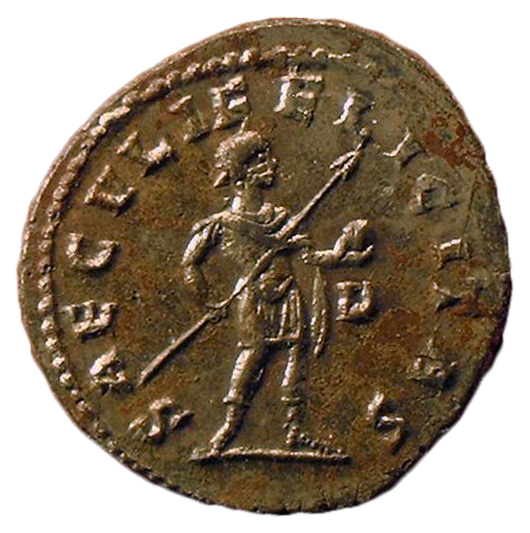
A Roman coin showing an antoninianus of Carinus holding pilum and globe

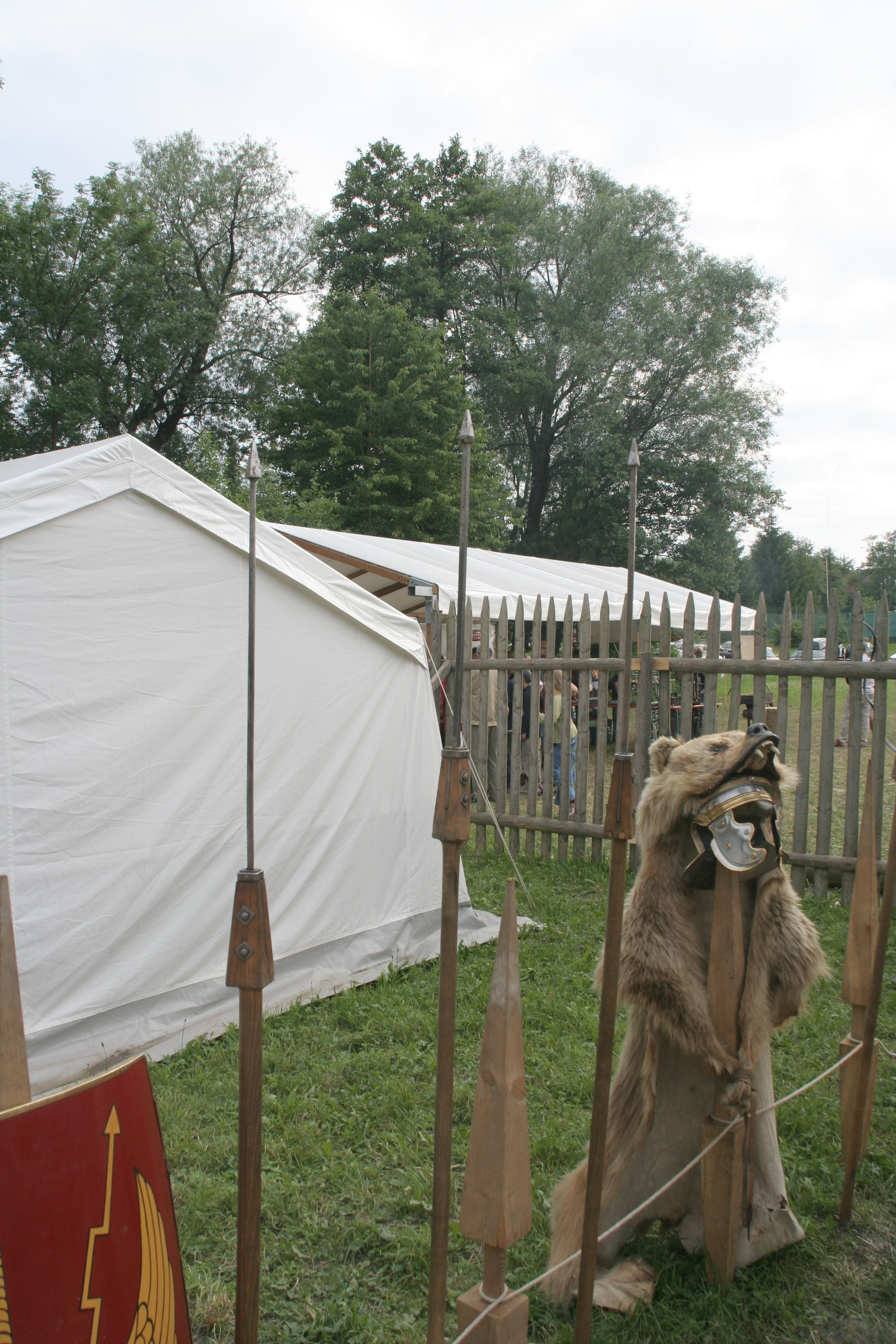
Close-up of re-enactment pila

== See also ==
- Lance
- Lancea (weapon)
- Polearm
- Projectile
- Roman military personal equipment
- Spear
- Verutum

== Bibliography ==
- Anglim, Simon; Rice, Rob S.; Jestice, Phyllis; Rusch, Scott; Serrati, John (2003). Fighting Techniques of the Ancient World (3000 B.C. to 500 A.D.): Equipment, Combat Skills, and Tactics. Macmillan. ISBN 978-0-312-30932-9.
- Bishop, M.C.; Coulston, J.C.N. (2009). Roman Military Equipment from the Punic Wars to the Fall of Rome. Oxford, UK: Oxford Books. ISBN 9781842171592.
- Connolly, Peter (1998). Greece and Rome at War. Greenhill Books. ISBN 1-85367-303-X..
- Connolly, Peter. "The pilum from Marius to Nero: a reconsideration of its development and function", Journal of Roman Military Equipment Studies, vol. 12/13, 2001/2, pp. 1–8.
- Cowan, Ross (2003). "Equipment". Roman legionary: 58 BC - AD 69. Osprey Publishing. pp. 25–26. ISBN 978-1-84176-600-3.
- D'Amato, Raffaele; Salimbeti, Andrea (2018). The Etruscans: 9th–2nd Centuries BC. Bloomsbury Publishing. ISBN 978-1-4728-2830-9.
- Paul Erdkamp, ed. (2007). A Companion to the Roman Army. Oxford: Blackwell Publishing Ltd. doi:10.1002/9780470996577. ISBN 978-0-470-99657-7.
- Jeon, Jeong-hwan; Kim, Sung-kyu; Koh, Jin-hwan (2015). "Historical review on the patterns of open innovation at the national level: the case of the roman period". Journal of Open Innovation: Technology, Market, and Complexity. 1 (2): 20. doi:10.1186/s40852-015-0026-4. hdl:10419/176513.
- Kerrigan, Michael (2001). Ancient Rome and the Roman Empire. DK Pub. ISBN 978-0-7894-8153-5.
- Matthew, Christopher (2010). "The Battle of Vercellae and the alteration of the heavy javelin (pilum) by Gaius Marius". Antichthon. 44: 50–67. doi:10.1017/S0066477400002070. ISSN 0066-4774. S2CID 145449944.
- Meiklejohn, K. W. (1938). "Roman Strategy and Tactics from 509 to 202 b.c.". Greece & Rome. 7 (21): 170–178. doi:10.1017/S0017383500005623.
- Nardo, Don (2004). The Roman Army: An Instrument of Power. Lucent Books. ISBN 978-1-59018-316-8.
- Nijboer, Albert (1991). "Funerary Symbols on the Temple Decorations from the Talamonaccio". Papers from the Institute of Archaeology. 2. doi:10.5334/pia.19.
- Petrocelli, Corrado (2015). "Tactics: Republic". In Le Bohec, Yann (ed.). The Encyclopedia of the Roman Army. Chichester, UK: John Wiley & Sons, Ltd. pp. 979–1028. doi:10.1002/9781118318140.wbra1478. ISBN 978-1-118-31814-0.
- Plutarch (2005). Penguin Classics: Fall of the Roman Republic. Translated by Rex Warner; Robin Seager (Revised ed.). Penguin Classic. ISBN 978-0-14-044934-1.
- Quesada Sanz, Fernando (2006). "Not so different: individual fighting techniques and small unit tactics of Roman and Iberian armies within the framework of warfare in the Hellenistic Age". Pallas (70): 245–263. ISSN 0031-0387. JSTOR 43684935.
- Secci, Davide Antonio (2012-01-01). "Priam's Spear and Pyrrhus' Shield (Verg. A. 2.544-6)1)". Mnemosyne. 65 (3): 413–424. doi:10.1163/156852511X547956.
- Slavik, Jordan F. (2017). "Pilum and Telum: The Roman Infantryman's Style of Combat in the Middle Republic". Classical Journal. 113 (2): 151–171. doi:10.1353/tcj.2017.0032. ISSN 2327-5812.
- Taylor, Michael J (2019). "Tactical reform in the late Roman republic: the view from Italy". Historia: Zeitschrift für Alte Geschichte. 68 (1): 76–94. doi:10.25162/historia-2019-0004. ISSN 0018-2311. S2CID 165437350.
- Zhmodikov, Alexander (2000). "Roman Republican Heavy Infantrymen in Battle (IV–II Centuries B.C.)". Historia: Zeitschrift für Alte Geschichte. 49 (1): 67–78. JSTOR 4436566.
- Holmes, Richard, ed. (2006). Weapon: A Visual History of Arms and Armor (1st ed.). Great Britain: Dorling Kindersley Limited. p. 45. ISBN 1-4053-1619-5.
- Марибор Институтp информацијских знаности (ed.). "Greco-Macedonian Influences in the Manipular Legion System :: M +". Arheologija i Prirodne Nauke (in Serbian) (11).
