= Lancea (weapon) =

Type of javelin used by the Roman auxiliary soldiers

The lancea was a javelin used in ancient Rome.

== Name ==
Latin lancea is generally regarded as a loanword. According to Varro, it was of Hispanian origin. Festus associated it with the Greek lónchē (λόγχη), although this connection is considered phonologically improbable by modern linguists.

Modern scholarship treats both Latin and Greek terms as independent borrowings from a third language, likely Celtic given the association of the weapon with Gauls and Galatians. In the 1st century BC, Diodorus writes: "The spears [the Gauls] brandish, which they call lanciae, have iron heads a cubit in length and even more, and a little under two palms in breadth". This interpretation is further supported by the occurrence of toponyms derived from Celtic lancia (Lancia in Spain, Lancio(n)- in Gaul) and by comparison with Old Irish do-léicim ('I throw').

== Definition ==
The lancea, also known as the hasta am(m)entata, was a long spear typically fitted with a thong (ammentum) attached near the middle of the shaft, which increased leverage and imparted additional spin, allowing the weapon to be thrown over considerable distances.

This kind of javelin also had short wooden shafts and small leaf-shaped metal heads. Sometimes the heads had elongated points which may have been used to increase the penetration of the spear.

== Usage ==
Soldiers that used the lancea were known as lancearii, who served in the Roman army as elite troops, speculatores (scouts), and in the imperial bodyguard. Although less penetrating than the pilum, the lancea was nevertheless highly effective against cavalry, elephants, and lightly armoured opponents.

One kind of lancea, possibly known as the lancea pugnatoria ('fighting lance'), was used as a thrusting weapon by cavalrymen. It was lighter and easier to handle than the pilum, which made it particularly suited to mounted combat.

The lancea was also used by auxiliaries. Legionaries would use the lancea if the occasion called for it. Arrian equipped his army with the weapon during a battle with the Alans.

== See also ==
- Pole weapon
- Pilum
- Spiculum
- Verutum
- Roman military personal equipment

== Bibliography ==
- Argüín, Adolfo Raúl Menéndez (2015), "Tactics: Principate", in Le Bohec, Yann (ed.), The Encyclopedia of the Roman Army, Chichester, UK: John Wiley & Sons, Ltd, pp. 979–1028, doi:10.1002/9781118318140.wbra1477, ISBN 978-1-118-31814-0.
- Cowan, Ross (2013). Roman Legionary AD 69–161. Bloomsbury Publishing. ISBN 978-1-4728-0283-5.
- Delamarre, Xavier (2003). Dictionnaire de la langue gauloise. Errance. ISBN 9782877723695.
- Ernout, Alfred; Meillet, Antoine (1985). Dictionnaire étymologique de la langue latine (4th ed.). Klincksieck. ISBN 978-2-252-03359-3.
- Gilliver, Kate (2007), "The Augustan Reform and the Structure of the Imperial Army", in Erdkamp, Paul (ed.), A Companion to the Roman Army, Oxford, UK: Blackwell Publishing Ltd, pp. 181–200, doi:10.1002/9780470996577.ch12, ISBN 978-0-470-99657-7.
- Goldsworthy, Adrian (2003). The Complete Roman Army. London: Thames & Hudson. p. 132. ISBN 978-0500288993.
- Link, Stefan (2006). "Lancearii". Brill's New Pauly. doi:10.1163/1574-9347_bnp_e629930.
- Rance, Philip (2015), "Infantry: Late Empire", in Le Bohec, Yann (ed.), The Encyclopedia of the Roman Army, Chichester, UK: John Wiley & Sons, Ltd, pp. 492–556, doi:10.1002/9781118318140.wbra0799, ISBN 978-1-118-31814-0.
- Rowlands, Ifor W. (2017). England and Europe in the Reign of Henry III (1216–1272). Routledge. ISBN 978-1-351-94012-2.
- Meakin, Tony (2001). A Basic Church Dictionary. Hymns Ancient and Modern Ltd. ISBN 978-1-85311-420-5.
- Pernet, Lionel (2015), "Spear", in Le Bohec, Yann (ed.), The Encyclopedia of the Roman Army, Chichester, UK: John Wiley & Sons, Ltd, pp. 843–978, doi:10.1002/9781118318140.wbra1415, ISBN 978-1-118-31814-0.
- Pollard, Nigel (2006), "The Roman Army", in Potter, David S. (ed.), A Companion to the Roman Empire, Malden, MA, USA: Blackwell Publishing Ltd, pp. 206–227, doi:10.1002/9780470996942.ch12, ISBN 978-0-470-99694-2.
- Syvänne, Ilkka (2017). Caracalla: A Military Biography. Pen and Sword. ISBN 978-1-4738-9526-3.
- Sommer, Carl (2007). We Look for a Kingdom: The Everyday Lives of the Early Christians. Ignatius Press. ISBN 978-1-68149-616-0.
- Southern, Pat (2007). The Roman Army: A Social and Institutional History. Oxford University Press. ISBN 978-0-19-804401-7.
- Speidel, M. P. (2007). "The Missing Weapons at Carlisle". Britannia. 38: 237–239. doi:10.3815/000000007784016502. ISSN 1753-5352. S2CID 163148762.
- Strobel, Karl (2007), "Strategy and Army Structure Between Septimius Severus and Constantine the Great", in Erdkamp, Paul (ed.), A Companion to the Roman Army, Oxford, UK: Blackwell Publishing Ltd, pp. 267–285, doi:10.1002/9780470996577.ch16, ISBN 978-0-470-99657-7.
