= Gunzendorf (Buttenheim) =

Coordinates: 49.808°N 11.077°E

Gunzendorf is a small village located in Bavaria, Germany. It is in Upper Franconia, in the Bamberg district. Gunzendorf is a constituent community of Buttenheim.

In 2010, the village had a population of 497, making it the second most populous constituent community of Buttenheim.

== History ==
Bishop Otto of Bamberg originally called the village "Gunzo's Village" in a writing in 1109. The village castle passed to the bishop of Würzburg. This castle was burned down in a peasant uprising in 1525, but was rebuilt. In 1913 the castle was renovated from the foundations up, and now houses the village kindergarten.

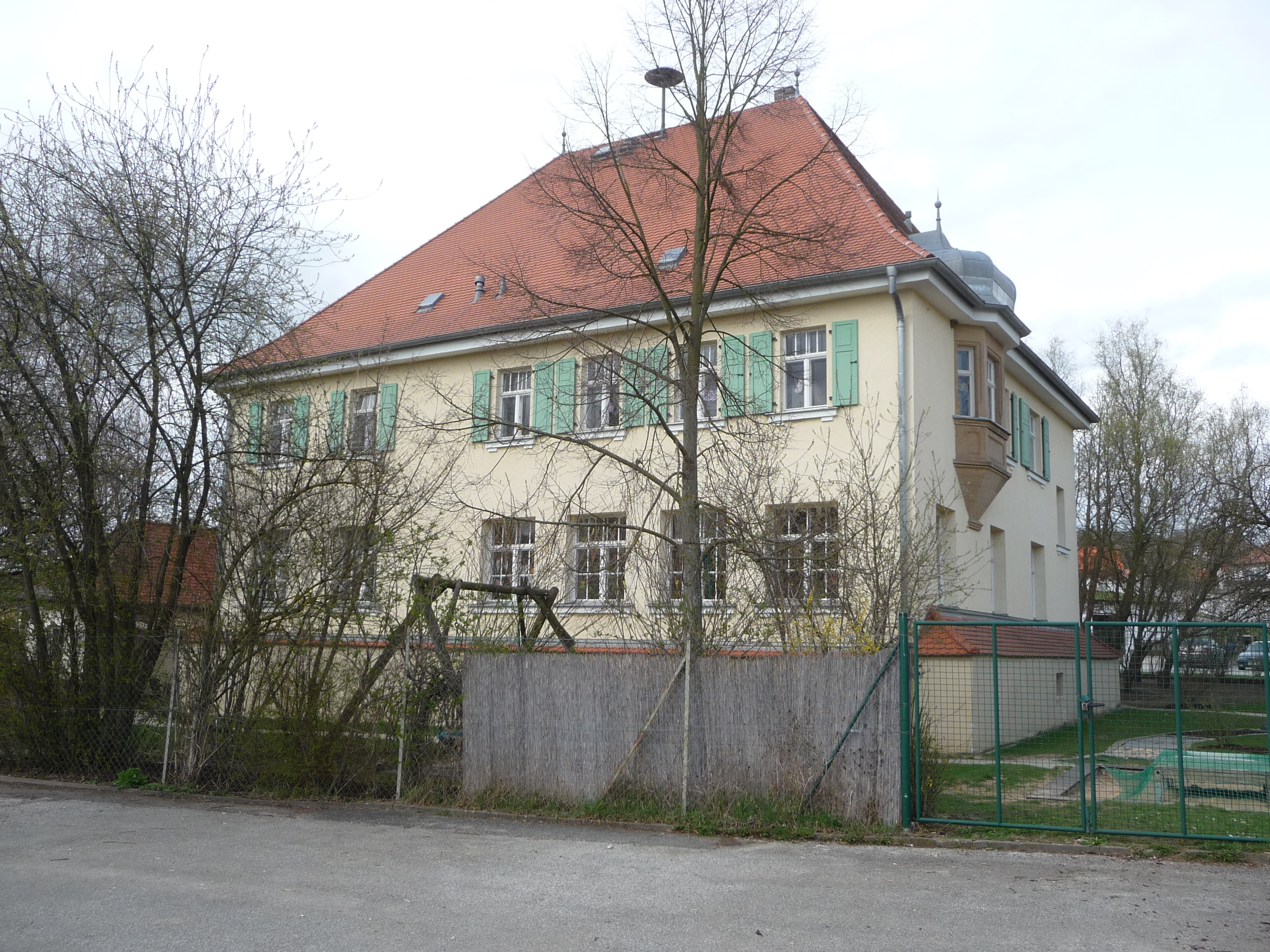
Kindergarten in Gunzendorf

A notable resident was Gallus Dennerlein (1742-1820), who joined the Banz Abbey and helped to develop it into a spiritual and scholarly center, until its dissolution in 1803.

== Culture ==
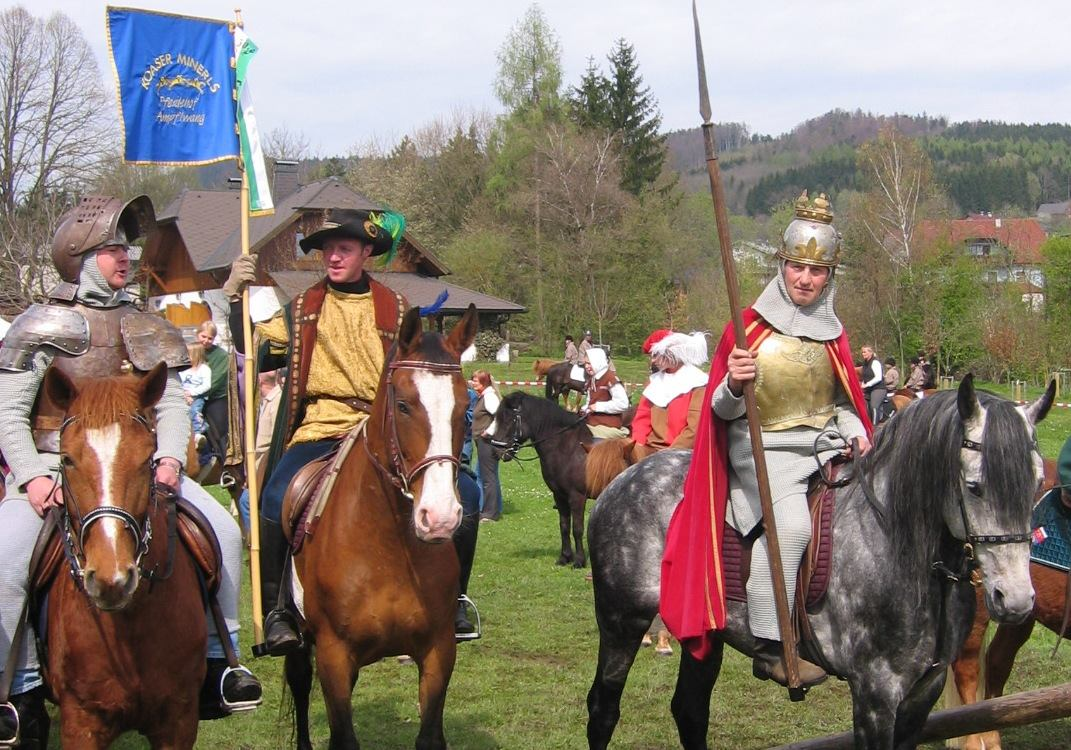
Georgiritt

Gunzendorf is home to the Catholic curate of Kuratie-Kirche "St. Nikolaus" Gunzendorf. The church is located on a slope just outside the village. The church was built between 1723 and 1724 on the spot of a previous building. The church is a baroque building with a tower 38 meters tall. An annual Georgiritt, or pilgrimage by horse done in honor of Saint George, takes place each year on April 23.

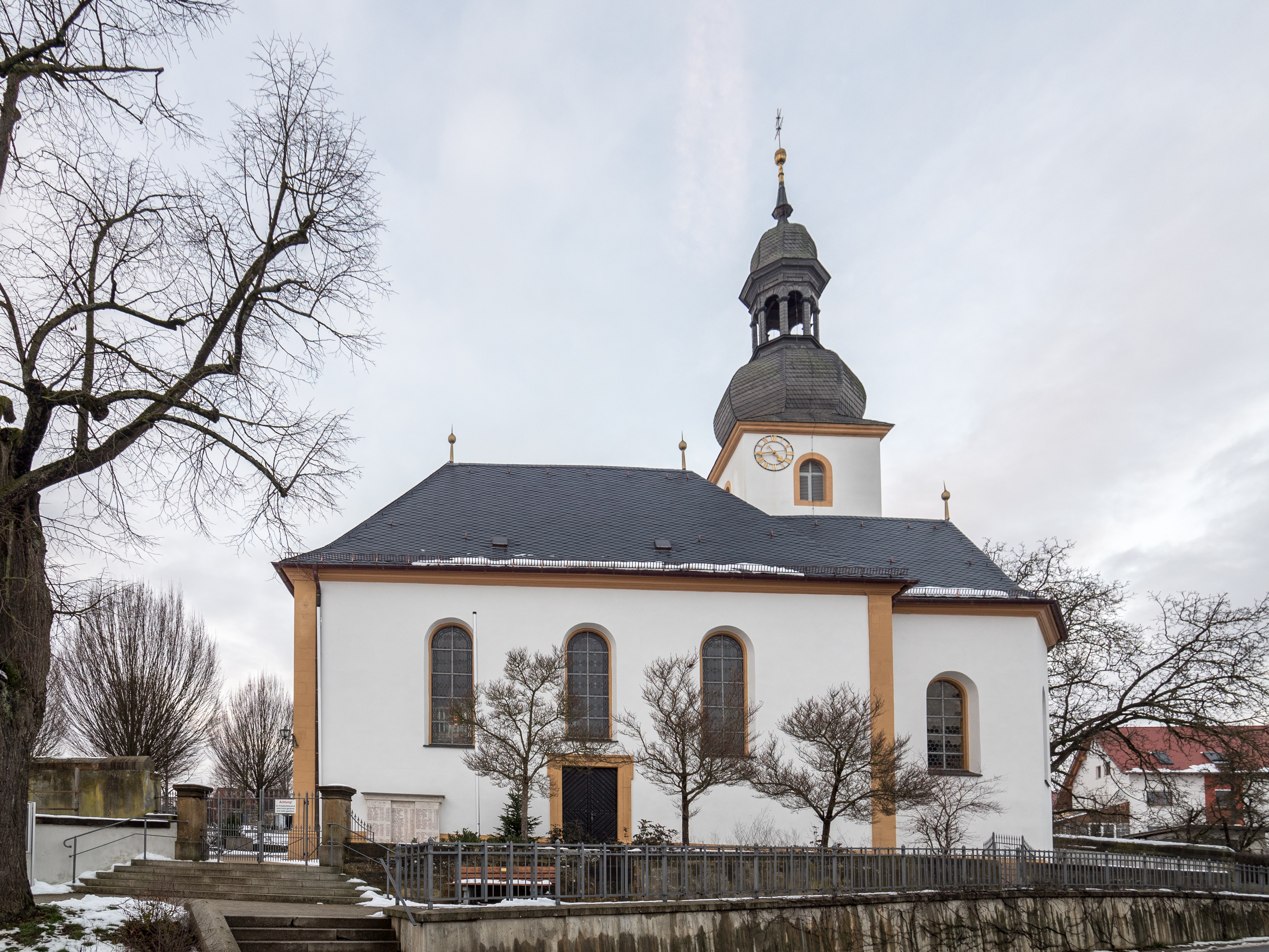
Catholic Church of St. Nicholas in Gunzendorf

There is an event hall in Gunzendorf, called Gunzendorf Live, which often holds concerts. There are also several restaurants and breweries in the village.

There are several community organizations in Gunzendorf. Some of these organizations include:

- Volunteer fire department "Freiwillige Feuerwehr Gunzendorf"
- Singing group "Singgemeinschaft Gunzendorf"
- Theater group "Theaterfreunde Gunzendorf"

== Geography ==
Gunzendorf is west of Dreuschendorf and south of Stackendorf.

The Deichselbach and the Möhlbach streams flow through the village.

== Infrastructure ==
Gunzendorf lies on the Staatsstraße (state road) 2260 and the Kreisstraße (district road) BA12.
