= Frankendorf (Buttenheim) =

Coordinates: 49°49′54″N 11°04′36″E

- Village
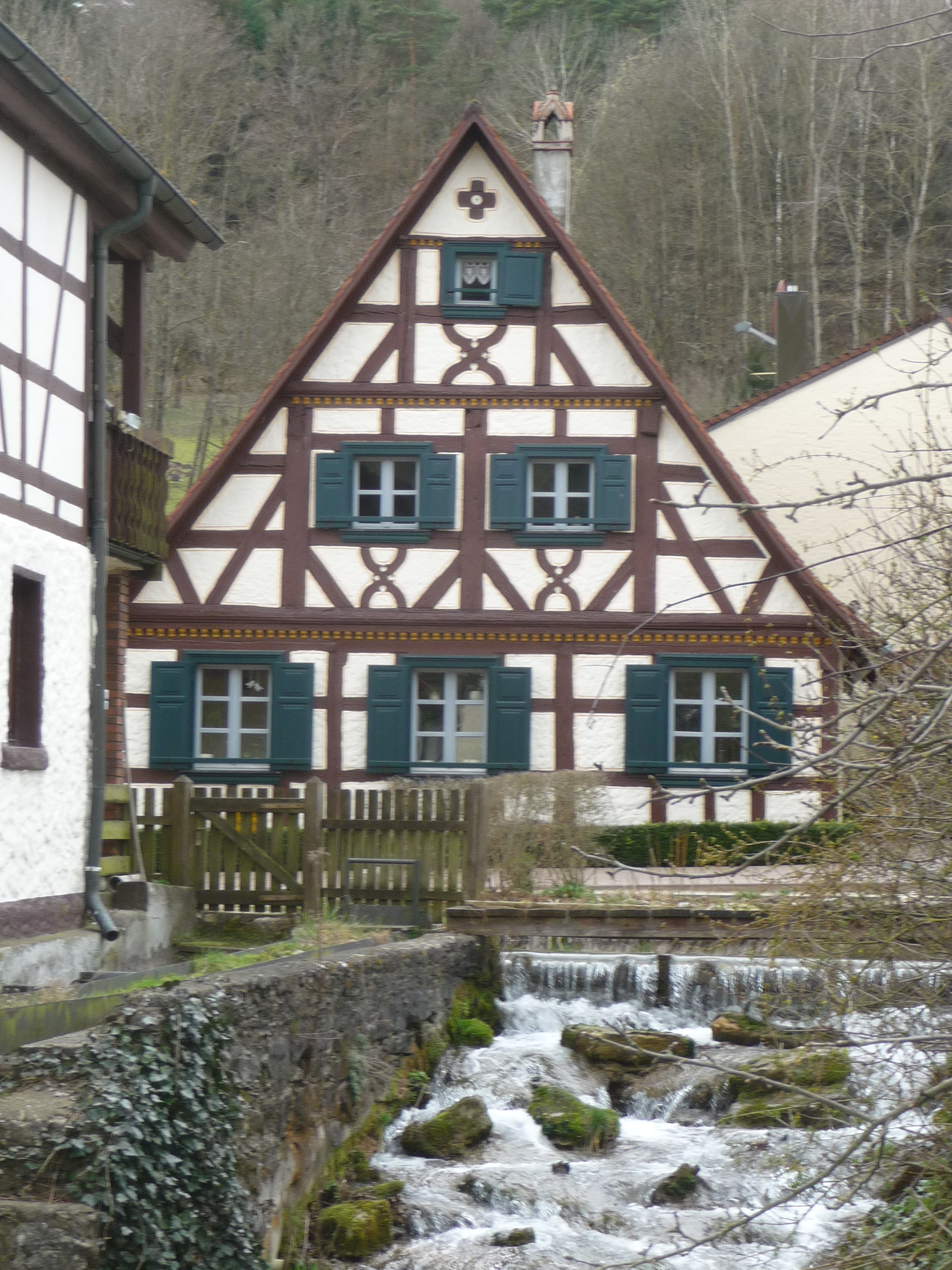
- House in Frankendorf, with the Deichselbach in the foreground.
- Interactive map of Frankendorf
- Country: Germany
- State: Bavaria
- Region: Upper Franconia
- District: Bamberg
- Elevation: 353 m (1,158 ft)

Population (2007)
  - Total: 146

Frankendorf is a small village located in Bavaria, Germany. It is in Upper Franconia, in the Bamberg district. Frankendorf is a constituent community of Buttenheim. In 2007, the village had a population of 146.

== Geography ==
A stream called the Deichselbach flows through the village.

The village has an elevation of 353 meters. Frankendorf lies in a narrow valley, bordered on the west and east by ridges that are approximately 50 meters higher than the town.

Frankendorf lies in the nature park "Naturpark Fränkische Schweiz - Veldensteiner Forst.

== Infrastructure ==
Frankendorf is connected to the neighboring villages of Tiefenhöchstadt and Stackendorf by a two-lane road that runs through it from north to south. About kilometers south of the village is the Staatsstraße 2260. The nearest highway is the Bundesautobahn 73.

== The “Golden Village” of Frankendorf ==
Frankendorf is known for its timber-frame houses, and in 1981, it became the winner of the contest Unser Dorf soll schöner werden (“Our village ought to become lovelier”). The district evaluation jury came to this conclusion in 1980:

“The almost fully preserved timber-frame ensemble with its 31 one-floor farmers’ houses under memorial protection is without peer in Upper Franconia.”

It goes on to say:

“The townsfolk’s community spirit and readiness to sacrifice were always exemplary for the district.”

About the landscape, this was stated:

“Orchards green the place in exemplary fashion; the valley is covered with groves of trees. The transition to free landscape is fluid.”

== Culture ==
There is a community organization in Frankendorf:

- Volunteer Fire Department: "FFW-Frankendorf"
