= Deichselbach =

River in Germany

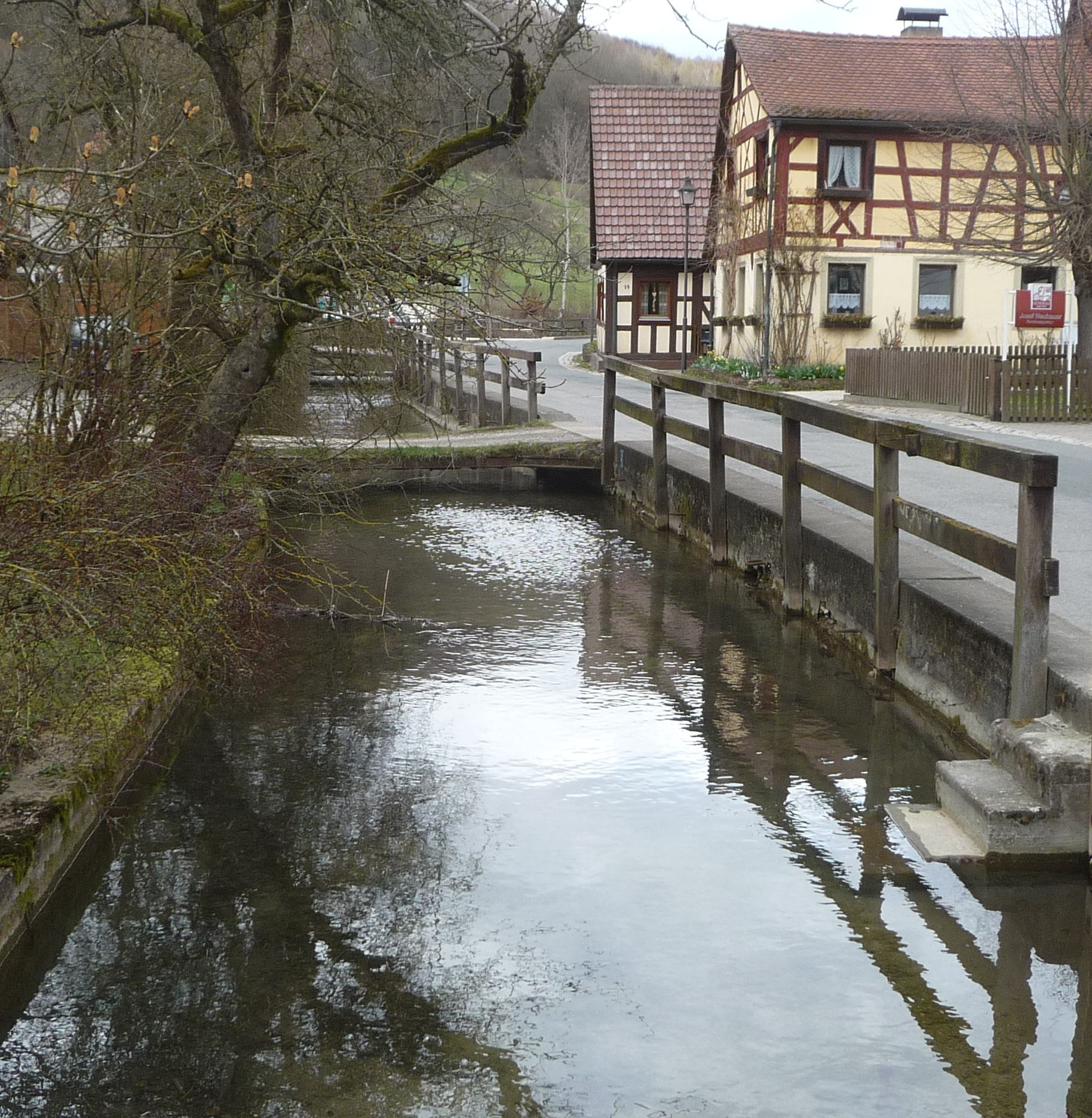
- The Deichselbach in Frankendorf

Location
- Country: Germany
- Location: Upper Franconia, Bavaria
- Reference no.: DE: 242912

Physical characteristics
- Source
  - location: near the village Tiefenhöchstadt in the community of Buttenheim
  - elevation: ca. 477 m above sea level (NN)
- Mouth
  - location: near Altendorf into the Regnitz
  - coordinates: 49.7972°N 10.9982°E
  - elevation: ca. 245 m above sea level (NN)
- Length: 12.1 km (7.5 mi)

Basin features
- Progression: Regnitz→ Main→ Rhine→ North Sea

The Deichselbach is a stream in Upper Franconia, Germany. It is about 12 kilometers long.

== Course ==
The Deichselbach has its source east of the village Tiefenhöchstadt in the community of Buttenheim. In Altendorf, the stream passes under the Rhine–Main–Danube Canal and then flows into the Regnitz.

The stream runs through the following places:

- Tiefenhöchstadt
- Frankendorf
- Stackendorf
- Gunzendorf (constituent community of Buttenheim)
- Dreuschendorf
- Buttenheim
- Altendorf
