= Kälberberg =

- Ortsteil of Buttenheim
- Interactive map of Kälberberg
- Location within Germany Location within Bavaria
- Coordinates: 49°51′1″N 11°3′39″E
- Country: Germany
- State: Bavaria
- Admin. region: Oberfranken
- District: Bamberg
- Municipality: Buttenheim

Population
  - Total: 37
- Time zone: UTC+01:00 (CET)
  - Summer (DST): UTC+02:00 (CEST)
- Postal codes: 96155

Kälberberg is a constituent community of Buttenheim, in the district of Bamberg. It is in the Upper Franconian region of Bavaria, Germany. It is a small village with about 30 inhabitants.

Kälberberg is about 1000 meters west of Tiefenhöchstadt and is north of Hochstall.

== History ==
The village was first mentioned in 1145; it had the name Calwenberg then.

== Culture and sightseeing ==
Just north of the village is the 142-meter-high Sender Bamberg, a transmission tower owned by Deutsche Telekom AG that provides radio, television and telephone service. It was built in 1973.

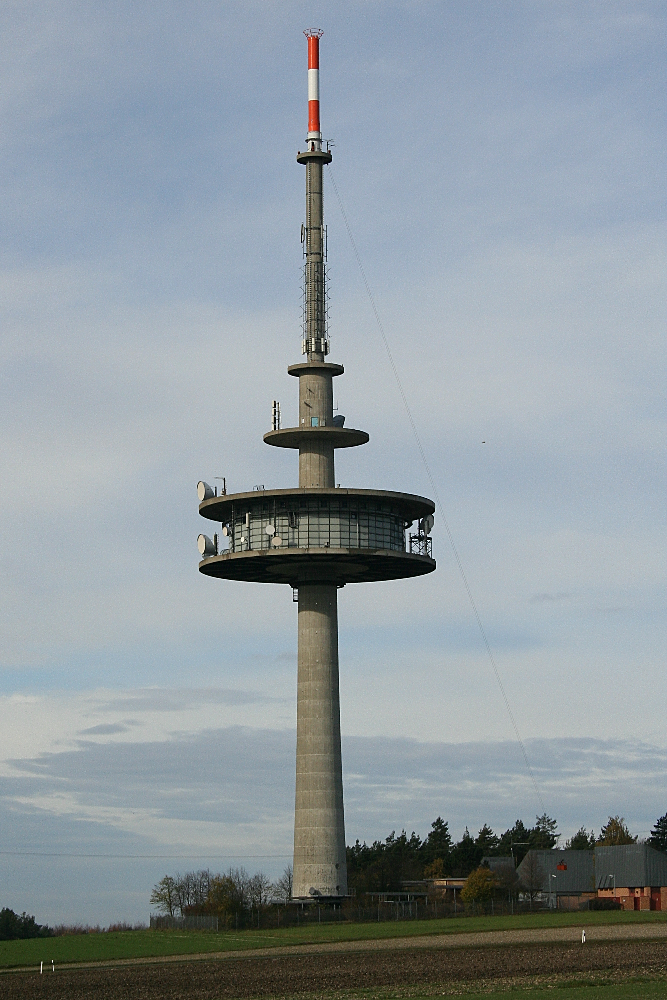
Sender Bamberg transmission tower

A bell tower was built in the village in 1996.
