= Altendorf, Upper Franconia =

Altendorf
- Municipality
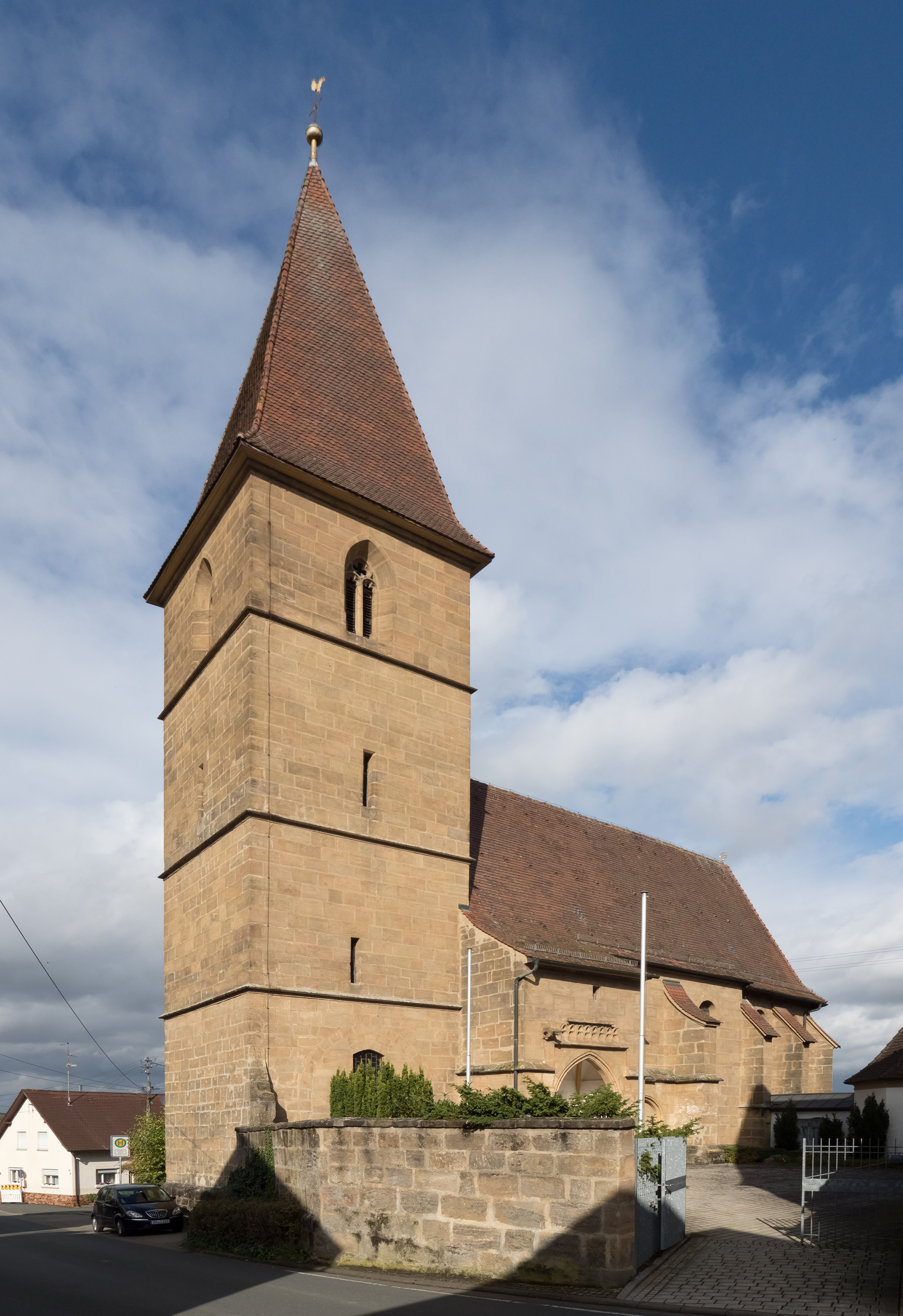
- Church of Saint Sigismund in Seußling

- Coat of arms

- Location of Altendorf within Bamberg district
- Interactive map of Altendorf
- Location within Germany Location within Bavaria
- Coordinates: 49°48′N 11°1′E
- Country: Germany
- State: Bavaria
- Admin. region: Oberfranken
- District: Bamberg

Government
  - Mayor (2020–26): Karl-Heinz Wagner (CSU)

Area
  - Total: 8.7 km^{2} (3.4 sq mi)
- Elevation: 251 m (823 ft)

Population (2025-12-31)
  - Total: 2,142
  - Density: 250/km^{2} (640/sq mi)
- Time zone: UTC+01:00 (CET)
  - Summer (DST): UTC+02:00 (CEST)
- Postal codes: 96146
- Dialling codes: 09545
- Vehicle registration: BA
- Website: www.altendorf-gemeinde.de

Altendorf (German pronunciation: [ˈaltn̩ˌdɔʁf], lit. 'old village') is a municipality in the Upper Franconian district of Bamberg, Bavaria, Germany.

== Geography ==
Altendorf lies in the Oberfranken-West (Upper Franconia West) Region.

=== Constituent communities ===
The namesake centre of Altendorf has 1,544 inhabitants while the outlying amalgamated centre of Seußling (or Seussling) has 542 (as of 1 January 2003).

The community also has two traditional rural land units, known in German as Gemarkungen, also named Altendorf and Seußling (it is traditional for a Gemarkung to be named after a town or village lying nearby).

== History ==
Before Secularization, Altendorf belonged to the High Monastery at Bamberg. Since the Reichsdeputationshauptschluss of 1803, the community has belonged to Bavaria. In the course of administrative reform in Bavaria, today's community came into being under the Gemeindeedikt (“Community Edict”) of 1818.

Many finds from Celtic times point to early settlement. While Altendorf was first mentioned as a Slavic round village in 1096, the outlying centre of Seußling had already been mentioned as a church village by 800. Here stood one of Charlemagne’s 14 Slavic churches (Slavenkirchen). Seußling's parochial area reached well into the Steigerwald (forest).

=== Religion ===
The Catholic church in Altendorf is affiliated with Sankt Bartholomäus, Buttenheim. Also within the community is the Catholic parish of Sankt-Sigismund Seußling.

The parish church of St. Sigismund received its patronage when Charles IV, Holy Roman Emperor had the saint's bones transferred from Saint-Maurice in the Swiss canton of Valais to Prague. The shrine was also set down in Seußling, holding one of the dead king's arms as a relic in the parish church.

Denominational breakdown of the inhabitants:

- Roman Catholic: 1,555
- Evangelical: 287
- other: 240

=== Population development ===
Within community limits, 1,274 inhabitants were counted in 1970, 1,542 in 1987 and 2,006 in 2000. In June 2007, 1,963 people lived in Altendorf.

The population growth between 1961 and 1971 amounted to 80% owing to the community's favourable location for transport links and widespread building development.

== Politics ==
The mayor is Karl-Heinz Wagner of the CSU.

The community council is made up of 14 members, listed here by party or voter community affiliation, and also with the number of seats that each holds, since the 2020 local elections:

- Freie Wählergemeinschaft Seußling: 4
- Zum Wohle der Gemeinde: 3
- CSU: 3
- Unabhängiger Bürgerblock: 2
- Aktive Bürger (AKB): 2

=== Coat of arms ===
Altendorf's arms might heraldically be described thus: Under the chief gules, therein a key argent per fess the bit downturned, in Or a horse trippant sable.

The German blazon, however, does not mention that the horse is trippant (standing with one forefoot raised), nor does it mention that the key's bit is downturned, but the arms are usually so executed.

The black horse is already seen on a silver coin found in the lands settled by the Celts and believed to have been struck about 80 BC. The silver key in the chief (band at the top of a coat of arms) refers to the connection to the old noble family of Schlüsselberg (“Schlüssel” literally means “key” in German).

== Economy and infrastructure ==
According to official statistics, there were no workers on the social welfare contribution rolls working in agriculture or forestry in 1998. In producing businesses there were 616, and in trade and transport 19. In other areas, 17 workers on the social welfare contribution rolls are employed, and 689 such workers work from home. Seven employed in processing businesses (as well as mining and quarrying). Four businesses are in construction, and furthermore, in 1999, there were 19 agricultural operations with a working area of 393 ha, of which 329 ha was cropland and 64 ha was meadowland.

=== Education ===
In 1999, the following institutions existed in Altendorf:

- Kindergartens with 75 places for 59 children
- Schools: primary school with first and second grades
