= Mikhail III of Tver =

Prince of Tver(1453–1505)

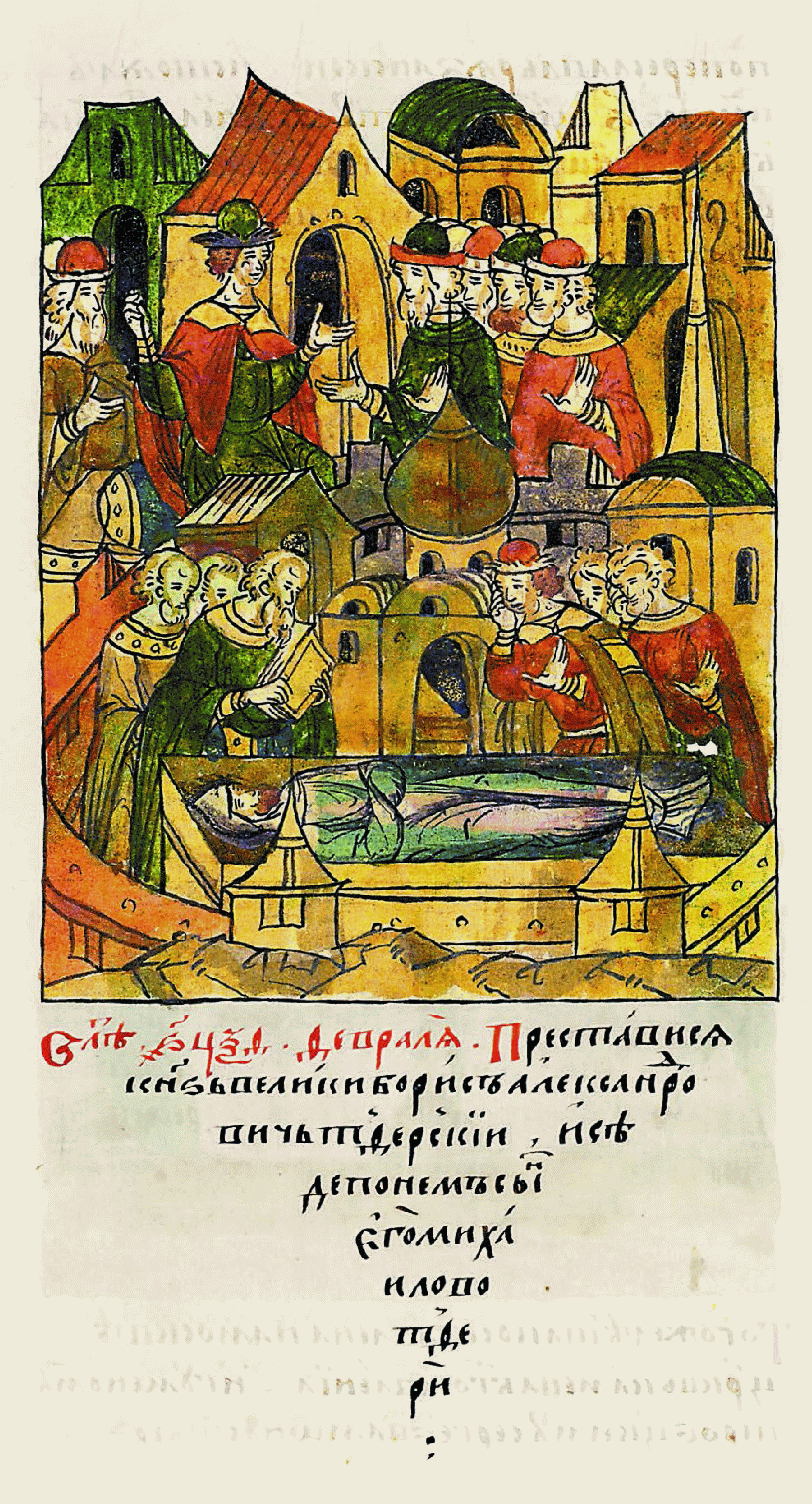

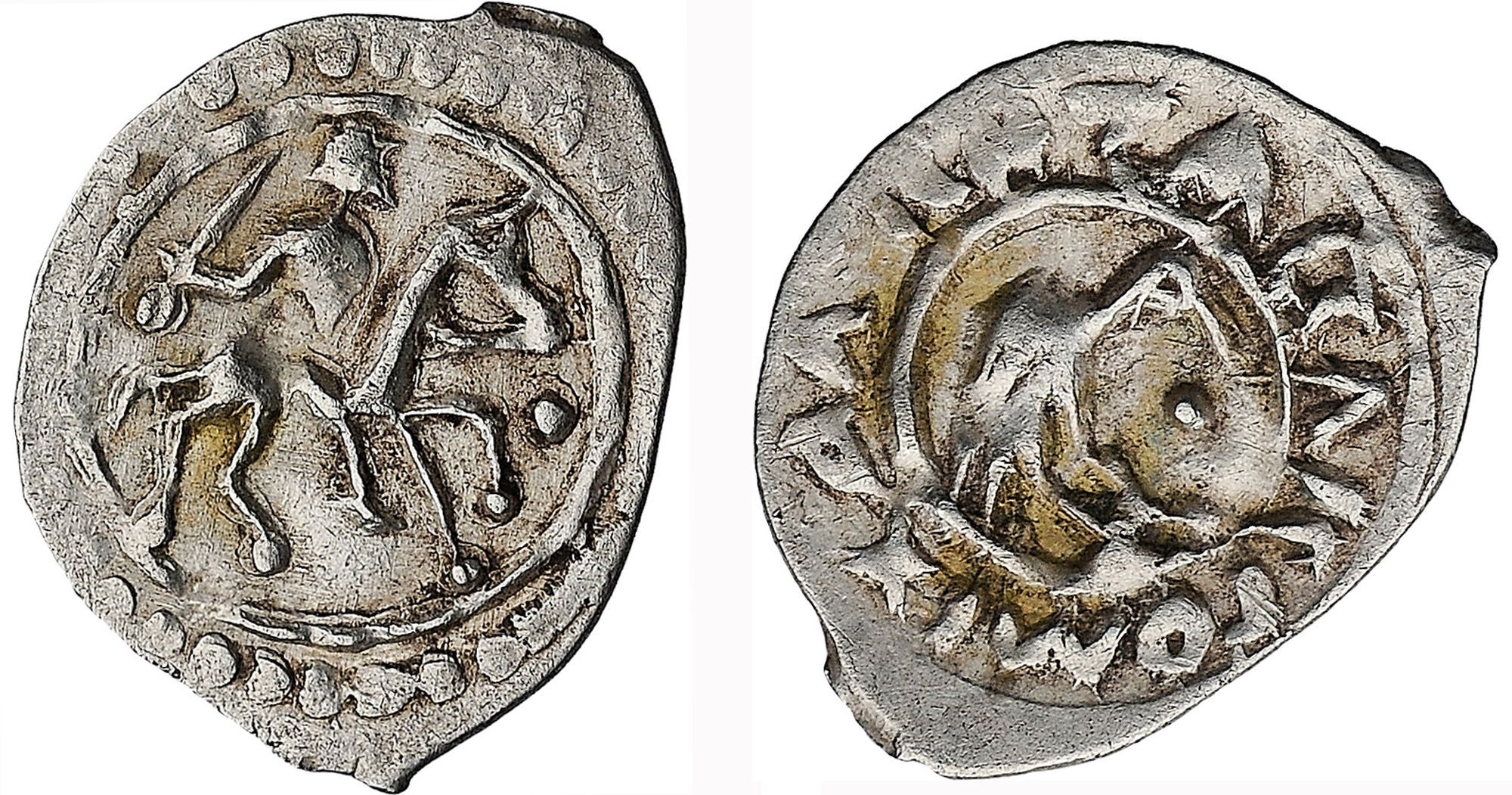
- Coat of arms
- Born: 1453
- Died: Unknown
- Spouse(s): Sofiya Semyonovna
- Father: Boris of Tver
- Mother: Anastasiya

Mikhail III of Tver or Michael the Exile (1453 – 1505) was the last prince of Tver, the son of Boris of Tver and Anastasia of Suzdal (died after 1486). He was Grand Prince of Tver from February 10, 1461, to 1485. He married Sophia Olelkovich, princess of Slutsk of Lithuanian origin in 1471 (died February 6, 1483), then a granddaughter of Casimir IV Jagiellon, and eventually lost the title when Ivan III of Moscow conquered Tver in 1485. Ivan the Younger, son of Ivan III the Great, is by some sources counted as prince of Tver from 1485 to 1490, but may have been without real ruling power.

== Fall of Tver ==
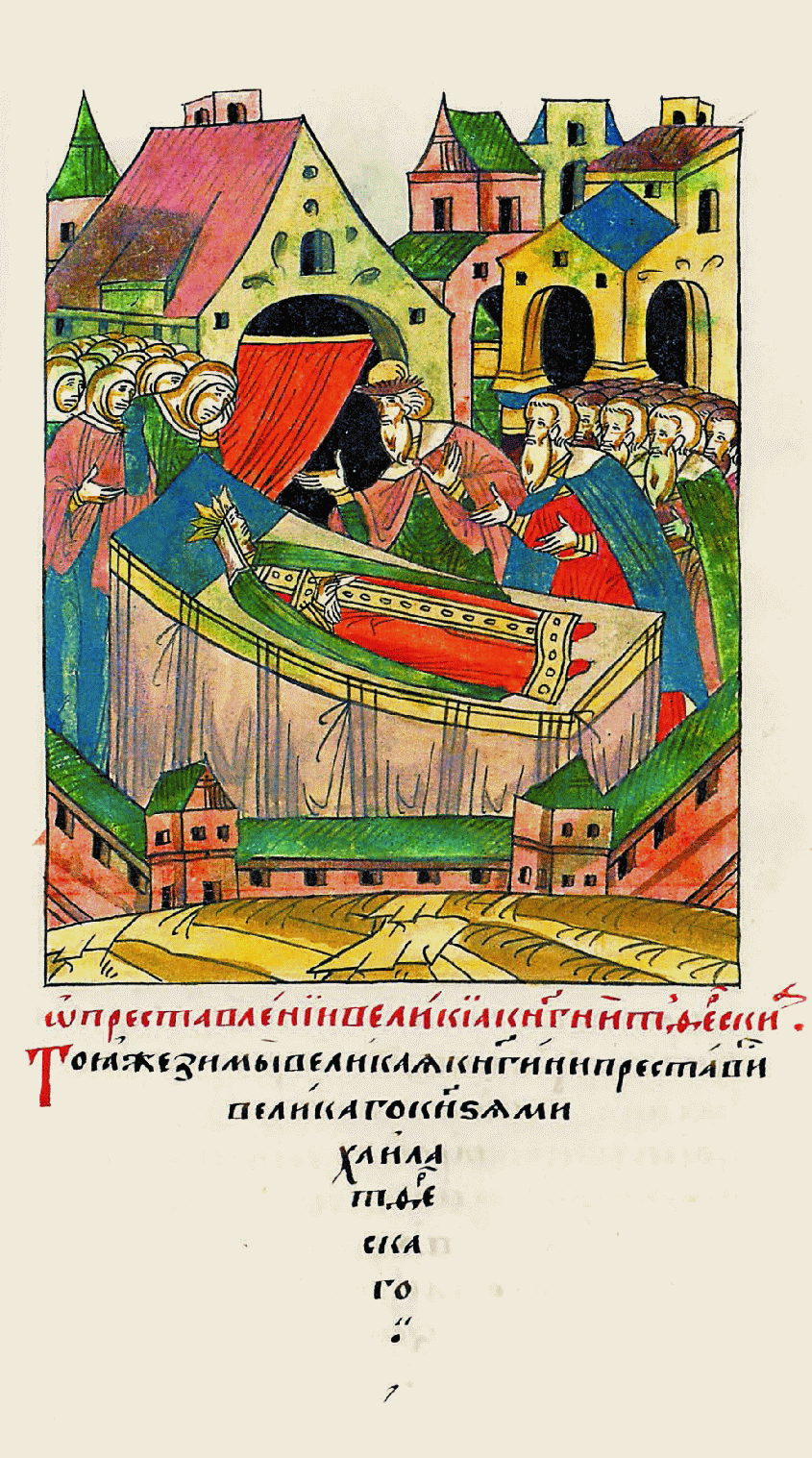
Death of princess of Tver, wife of Michael III

The prominent Russian historian Nikolay Karamzin described the Principality of Tver in the middle of the 15th century as a state, equal to Moscow in glory and rights. Though it was already surrounded by Muscovy lands, it still has its independence.

As far back as in 1427, Mikhail's father Boris I of Tver tried to unite forces with the Grand Duchy of Lithuania, but after the death of Vytautas the feudal wars weakened Lithuania and thus gave no power against Moscow. In 1463, Ivan III conquered the Principality of Yaroslavl, in 1478 he annexed Novgorod, so Lithuania remained the only possible ally of Tver against Moscow.

Widowed in 1483, Mikhail III tried to marry the granddaughter of Lithuanian ruler Casimir IV Jagiellon. Ivan III used this move as a reason to declare war to Tver. In 1485, Mikhail III "acknowledged himself as a lesser brother" and signed a peace treaty, sworn to fight on side of Moscow in any wars. The treaty also restricted Tver diplomatic relations and freedom.

The Muscovites oppressed the boyars of Tver, but all the disputes Ivan III settled to the good of Muscovites. Seeing Mikhail's inability to protect them, many Tver noblemen swore allegiance to Moscow. Mikhail decided to flee to Lithuania, but the messenger with his private letter to king Kazimir was stopped by Ivan's people. The letter broke earlier treaty and was considered treason. Mikhail sent Tver's archbishop to Ivan III with apologies, but they weren't accepted.

On 21 August 1485, Ivan III moved his army to Tver. On the 8 September. he seized the city and set fire to the posad. In 10 days all the boyars and noblemen fled, leaving Mikhail alone. He has only two opportunities left — to flee to Lithuania or to yield to Ivan's mercy. Mikhail decided to escape, on the next morning the only left noblemen archbishop Vassian and prince Mikhail Khomsky opened the city gates to Ivan III, acknowledging him as the monarch of all Rus'.

== Exile ==
Mikhail of Tver went to exile to Kingdom of Poland and Grand Duchy of Lithuania, trying to regain the throne of Tver. In Kraków he asked for help of King Casimir, but he refused and even sent a message to Ivan III, stating no intentions to interfere. However, Kazimir gave Mikhail two small estates (in Slonim and Volhynia).

== Marriages and children ==
Mikhail's first wife Sophia (died 1483) was the daughter of Simeon Olelkovich, the last prince of Kiev. His second wife was the granddaughter of Casimir IV Jagiellon. Neither marriage had sons, so after the death of Mikhail III ended the line of Princes of Tver.

== Sources ==
- Cherepnin, L. V. (1960). Образование Русского централизованного государства [Establishment of the Russian Centralized State] (in Russian). Moscow: Socio-Economic Literature Publishing House. pp. 889–893. ISBN 9785458287616.
- Solovyev, S. M. (2013). История России. Русь при Иване Великом (in Russian). Moscow: Olma Press. ISBN 978-5-373-03412-8.
