= Bohemian earspoon =

Pole arm

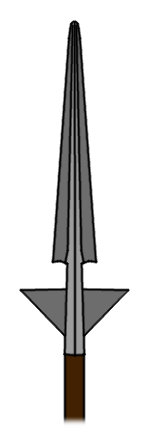
The head of an earspoon, showing the spearhead and the ears.

The Bohemian earspoon (German Böhmischer Ohrlöffel or Knebelspiess, Czech ušatá sudlice) is a polearm featuring a long, broad, socketed spearhead with two out-turned lugs (sharply bent hooks, straight spikes, or triangular guards) at the base of the head, forming a guard similar to that of a boar spear.

Derived ultimately from the early Medieval lugged spear, the earspoon developed in the 14th century. Its use was probably not confined to Central Europe. It was used for both hunting and military purposes.

The source of the name is uncertain in English, perhaps derived from the Czech name, which literally means "eary voulge," probably referring to the two sharp tips.
