= Hochstall =

Coordinates: 49°50′N 11°03′E

Hochstall is a small village located in Bavaria, Germany. It is in Upper Franconia, in the Bamberg district. Hochstall is a constituent community of Buttenheim.

In 2010, the village had a population of 31.

== Geography ==
The village is about 900 meters south of Kälberberg.
