= Boris of Tver =

Deceased Grand Prince of Tver

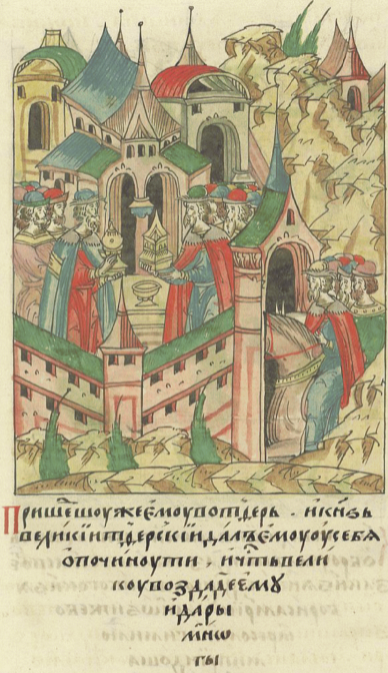
- Born: 1400
- Spouse(s): Anastasiya, Anastasiya Andreyevna
- Issue Mikhail III of Tver

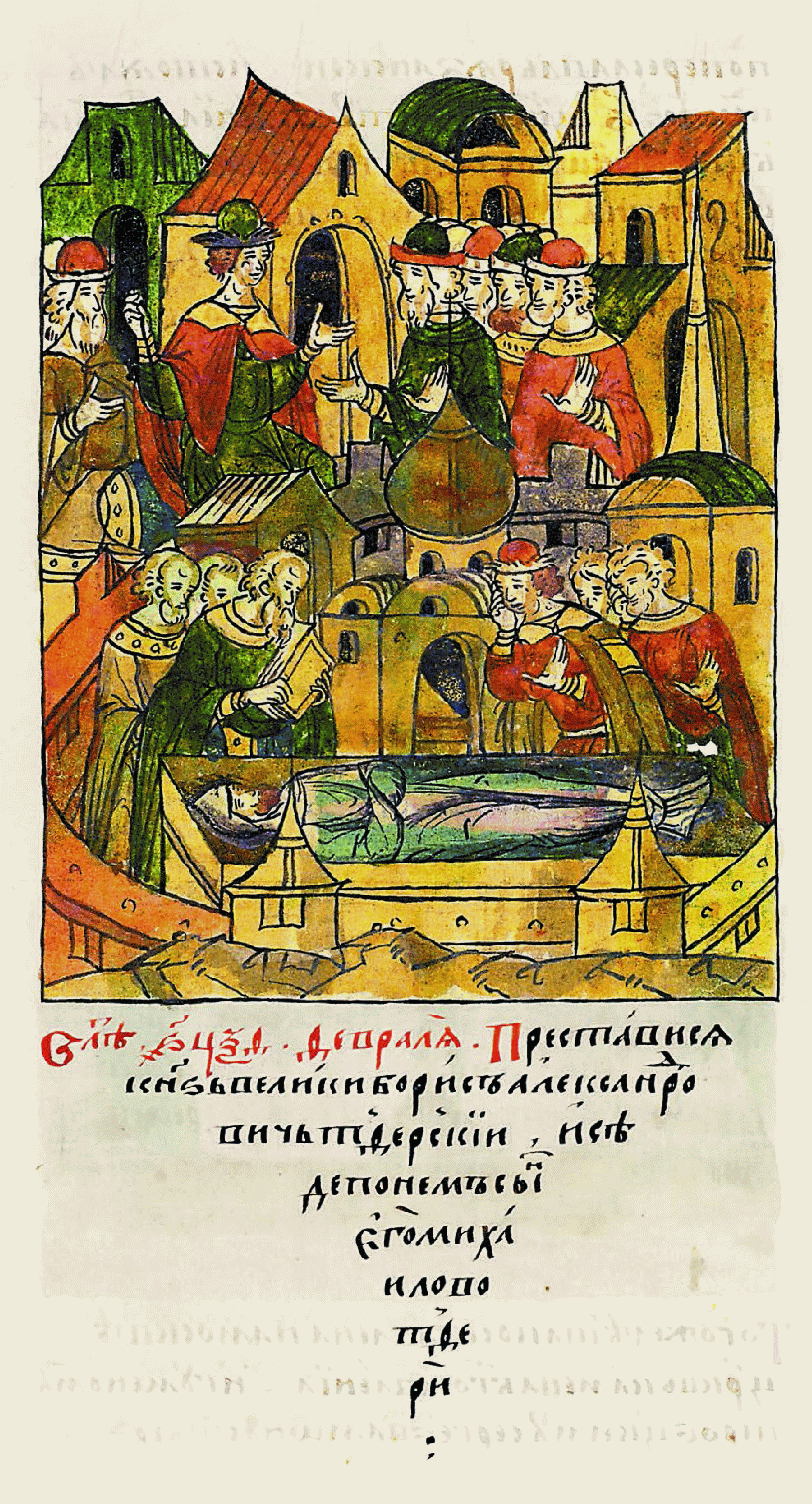
Funeral of Boris Alexandrovich of Tver

Boris Aleksandrovich of Tver or Boris the Great (c. 1399 – 10 February 1461) was a Grand Prince of Tver from 22 April 1426 until his death.

== Biography ==
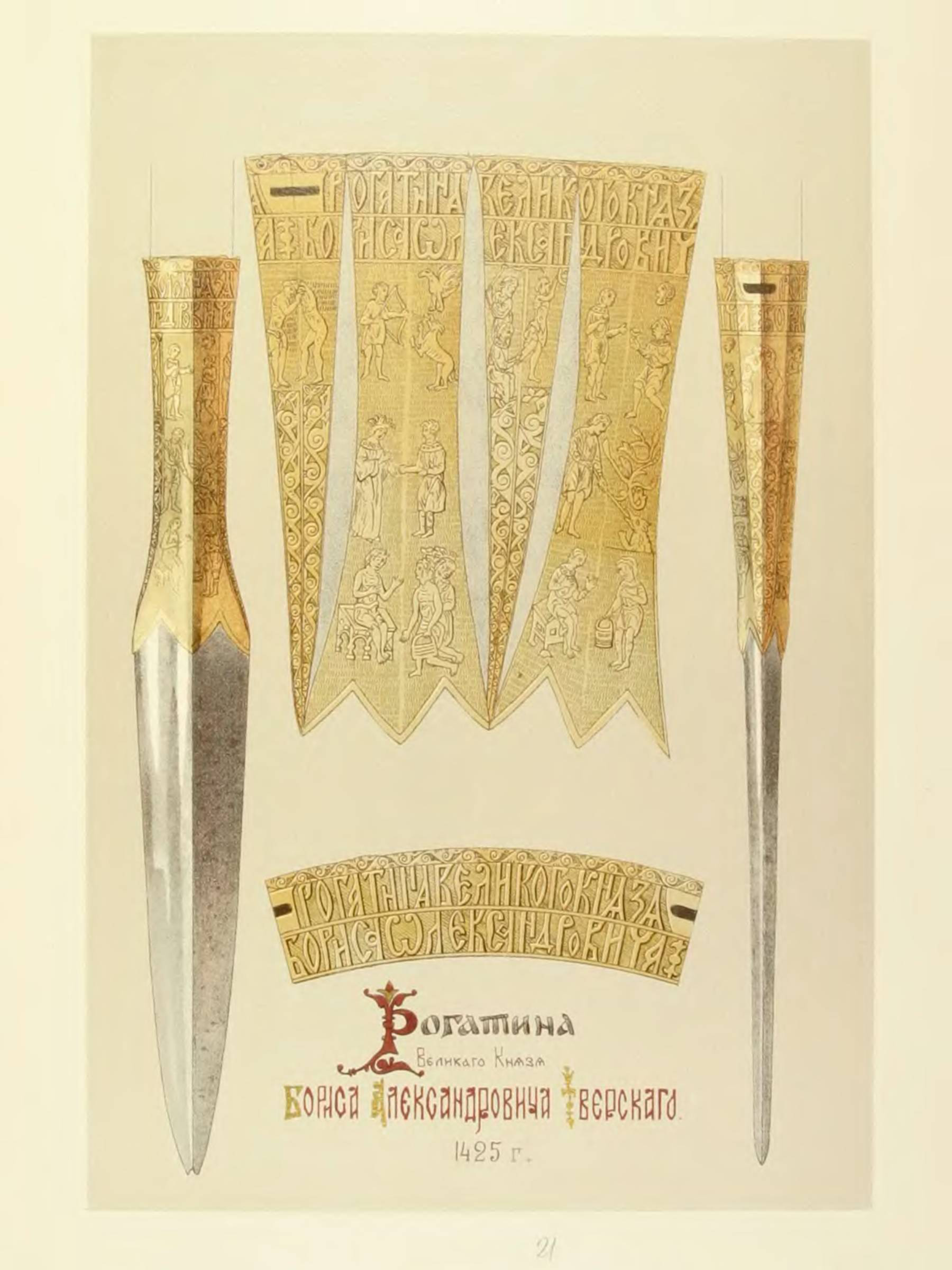
Rohatyn of Boris Tverskoy

=== Domestic and foreign politics ===
The year 1425 was devastating for the Principality of Tver. After the sudden death of Vasily I of Moscow, in the same year plague killed three Grand Dukes of Tver: Ivan Mikhailovich, Boris' father Aleksander Ivanovich and brother Yuri Aleksandrovich. Thus Boris Aleksandrovich became the ruler of the principality.

At the beginning of his reign the Muscovite prince Vasily II was very young, so the power was concentrated in hands of his warden Vytautas (Vitovt). That was the last chance for Tver to prevent Moscow from complete dominance. In 1427, Boris signed a treaty with Vytautas together with Ivan III of Ryazan, recognising the seniority of Vytautas. However, in 1430 Vytautas died, and the Grand Duchy of Lithuania descended into a succession struggle. Meanwhile in Rus' started the Muscovite Civil War, that weakened the Moscow princes and let the Principality of Tver more independence.

In 1451, Boris of Tver concluded a marriage alliance with Vasily II by marrying off his daughter Maria of Tver to Ivan Vasilyevich. With the help of Saint Jonah, Boris promised Vasily to always support their children and Moscow's interests. In 1454 with the death of Dmitry Shemyaka the war was ended, and both Boris I and Ivan III of Ryazan swore their allegiance to Moscow.

The Kremlin Armoury keeps a bear spear belonging to Boris.

=== Word of Praise ===
During his reign, around or after 1453, the monk Foma (Thomas) of Tver wrote the Pokhval'noe slovo (похвальное слово) or Word of Praise for the Grand Prince Boris Aleksandrovich. It is alternately known as The Eulogy of the Pious Grand Prince Boris Alexandrovich, and has traditionally been interpreted as the origins of the idea of a Third Rome (after the 1453 Fall of Constantinople); although this ideology would later be associated with Moscow, it began in Tver.

In 1977, Charles J. Halperin analysed that the Muscovite War of Succession weakened Muscovy so much that its old Tverian rival once again felt strong enough to challenge its sole claim to represent the "Rus' Land" (русская земля) in this Word of Praise. Unlike later Muscovite writings, however, it does not claim that the Byzantine Greeks were "apostates", and does not seek to set up Tver as Constantinople's successor, but is loyal to Byzantine authority. Similarly, the Word of Praise to Boris of Tver never claimed the myth of the Rus' Land exclusively for itself instead of Moscow, but it did suggest that the "Tverian Land" (Тферськая земля) and "Muscovite Land" (Московская земля) were equals within a larger "Rus' Land", and went as far as having the Greek foreigners say that grand prince Boris Aleksandrovich of Tver was 'the greatest prince of the Rus' Land'.

== Marriages and family ==
He first married to Anastasia Andreevna of Mozhaysk, Dmitry Donskoy granddaughter. They had a daughter Maria of Tver (future wife of Ivan III of Moscow).

The second marriage was to Anastasia Alexandrovna of Suzdal, daughter of Aleksander Vasilyevich Shuysky. She gave Boris two sons - Mikhail III of Tver and Alexander (died between 1454-1455). In 1485 she tried to hide Mikhail's treasury and sentenced to exile in Pereslavl-Zalessky.

== Bibliography ==
- Martin, Janet (2007). Medieval Russia: 980–1584. Second Edition. E-book. Cambridge: Cambridge University Press. ISBN 978-0-511-36800-4.
