= Dreuschendorf =

Village in Bavaria, Germany

Coordinates: 49°48′N 11°03′E

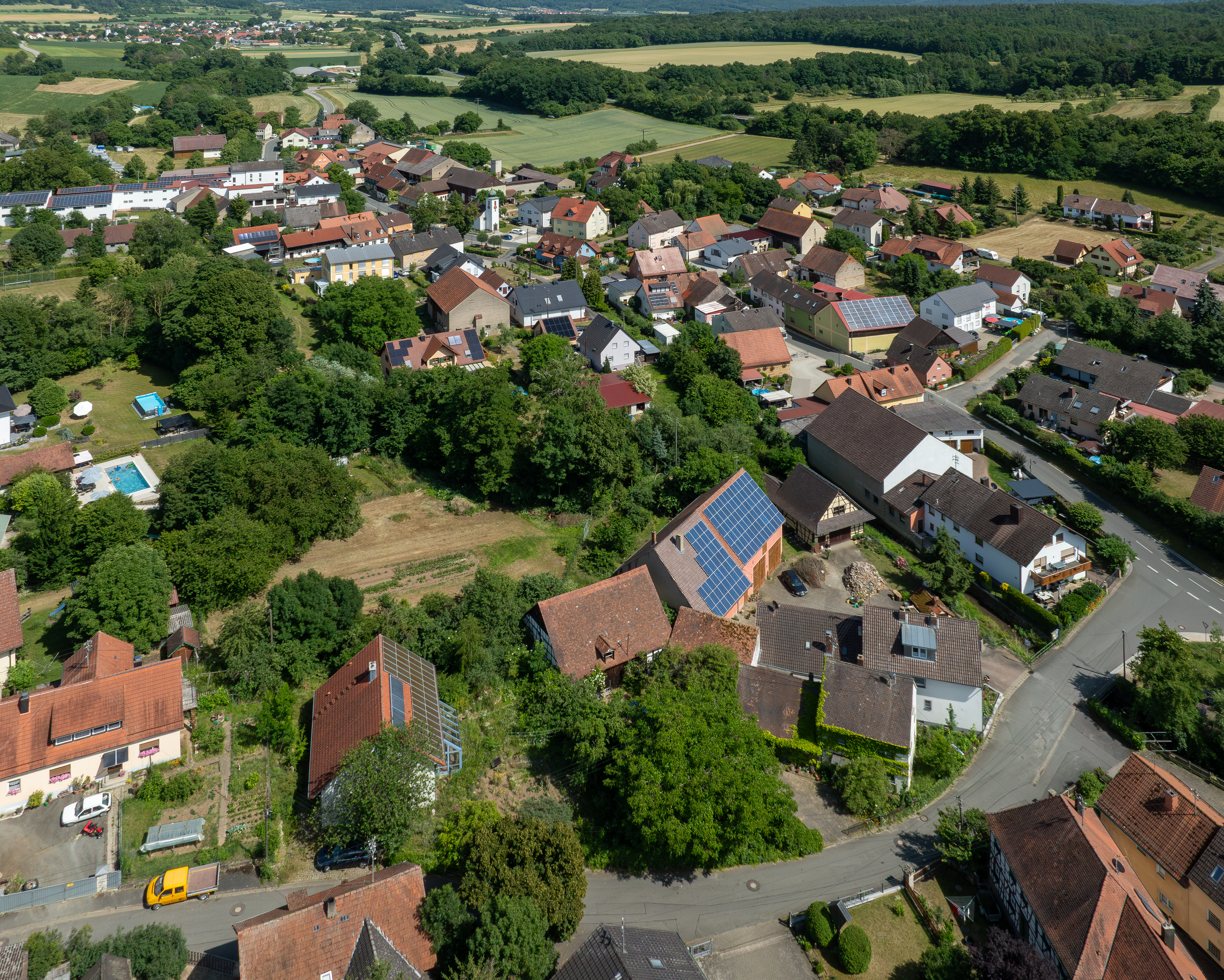
Dreuschendorf

Dreuschendorf is a small village located in Bavaria, Germany. It is in Upper Franconia, in the Bamberg district. Dreuschendorf is a constituent community of Buttenheim.

In 2007, the village had a population of 327.

== Geography ==
Dreuschendorf has an elevation of about 273 meters.

The Deichselbach stream flows through the village, and west of the village, the Schußbach stream flows into the Deichselbach.

Dreuschendorf lies in the nature park "Naturpark Fränkische Schweiz - Veldensteiner Forst."

Dreuschendorf lies on the Staatsstraße 2260.

== History ==
Dreuschendorf was first mentioned in the year 1116; it was at that time named Druskendorf (or "village of the companions").

In 1492, it was completely destroyed during a feud between Bamberg's Prince-Bishop and a Baron of the Holy Roman Empire from Buttenheim. During the Thirty Years' War, Dreuschendorf was again destroyed.

In earlier times, the village was an important place for pilgrims traveling through the Franconian Jura to Ebermannstadt or Gößweinstein.

== Church ==
In 1727, a small chapel was built at the southern edge of the village; this was removed in 1923. In its place, a new chapel was built in the village center. The consecration of the church, named St. Anna, took place on September 28, 1924. On October 30, a new organ, built by the Volkmar Krätzer company, was added.

On the occasion of its 75th anniversary in 1999, the chapel was renovated.

== Culture ==
North of Dreuschendorf is a community house, which lies opposite a football field with a playground.

There is a brewery in the village named the "Brauerei Meusel."

There are several community organizations in Dreuschendorf:

- "Bürgerverein Dreuschendorf": Civic association
- "Freiwillige Feuerwehr Dreuschendorf": Volunteer fire department
- "The road goes on forever": Motorcycle club
- "VdK-Ortsverband Dreuschendorf": Social/political organization
