= Bear spear =

Type of pole weapon primarily used for bear hunting

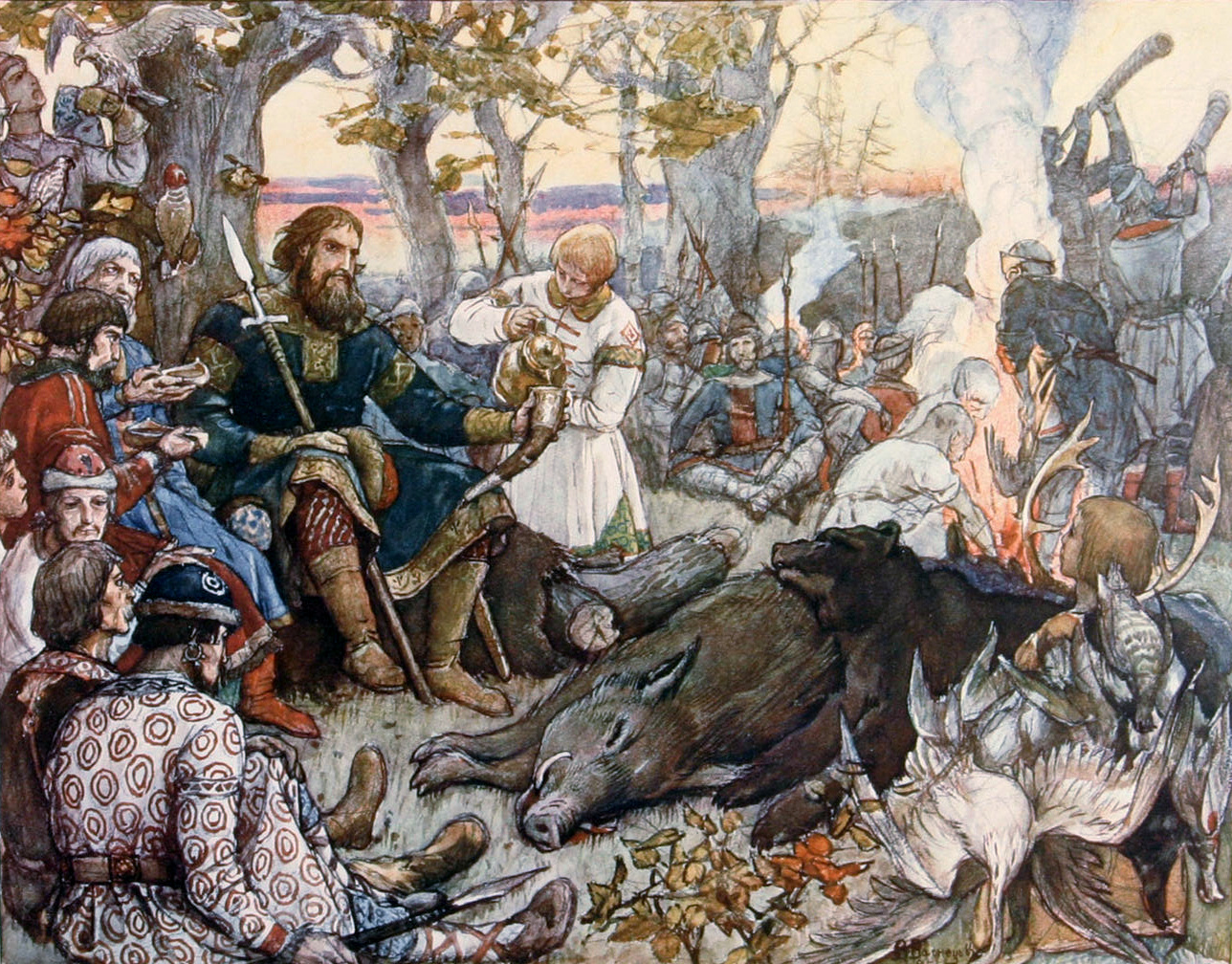
Vladimir Monomakh resting after hunt

A bear spear was a medieval type of spear used in hunting for bears and other large animals, such as boars (in which case it might be called a boar spear). The sharpened head of a bear spear was enlarged and usually took the form of a bay leaf. Right under the head there was a short crosspiece that helped limit the penetration of the spear into the body of an animal and keep it at a distance from the hunter.

== Description ==
Boar spears are relatively short and heavy, with two "lugs" or "wings" on the spearsocket behind the blade, which act as a barrier to prevent the spear from penetrating too deeply into the quarry where it might get stuck or break, and to stop an injured and furious boar from working its way up the shaft of the spear to attack the hunter.

The bear spear was similar to a boar spear, but it had a longer and harder shaft and a larger head. Often it was placed against the ground on its rear point, which made it easier to hold the weight of an attacking beast.

The bear spear was used against the largest animals, not only bears, but also wisents and war horses, thus not only in hunting, but in warfare as well. It could also be used against smaller animals such as boars, but in that case it was more unwieldy than the specialized boar spear.

In the Slavic countries, it was known as a rogatina, (Note: Rogatina/rohatyna is derived from the word rog/roh, 'horn', i.e., meaning "a horned thing") and used since at least the 12th century. The Slavic term rogatina has a broader meaning: the military ones did have a wide flat head, but did not necessarily have the crosspiece. According to the Hypatian Codex, it was first used as a military weapon in 1149, and as a hunting weapon in 1255, when it was used by Prince Daniel of Galicia in boar hunting; the chronicles say he "killed three of them with his rogatina himself". One of the most famous is the rogatina of Boris of Tver dating to the 15th century, now in the inventory of the Kremlin Armoury.

In Poland, rohatyna could have a single side hook, rather than cross.

In Germany, the bear spear or Bärenspieß was known from at least the Late Middle Ages but was rather rare when compared to Eastern Europe due to the much smaller bear population.

== Gallery ==
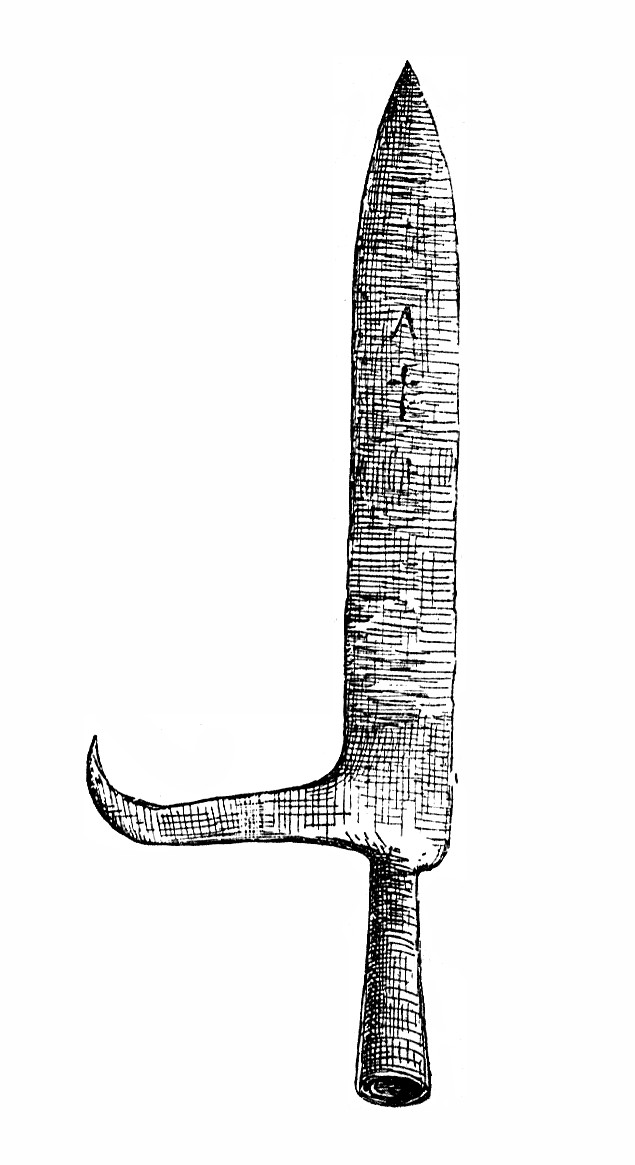
The head of a Polish rohatyna

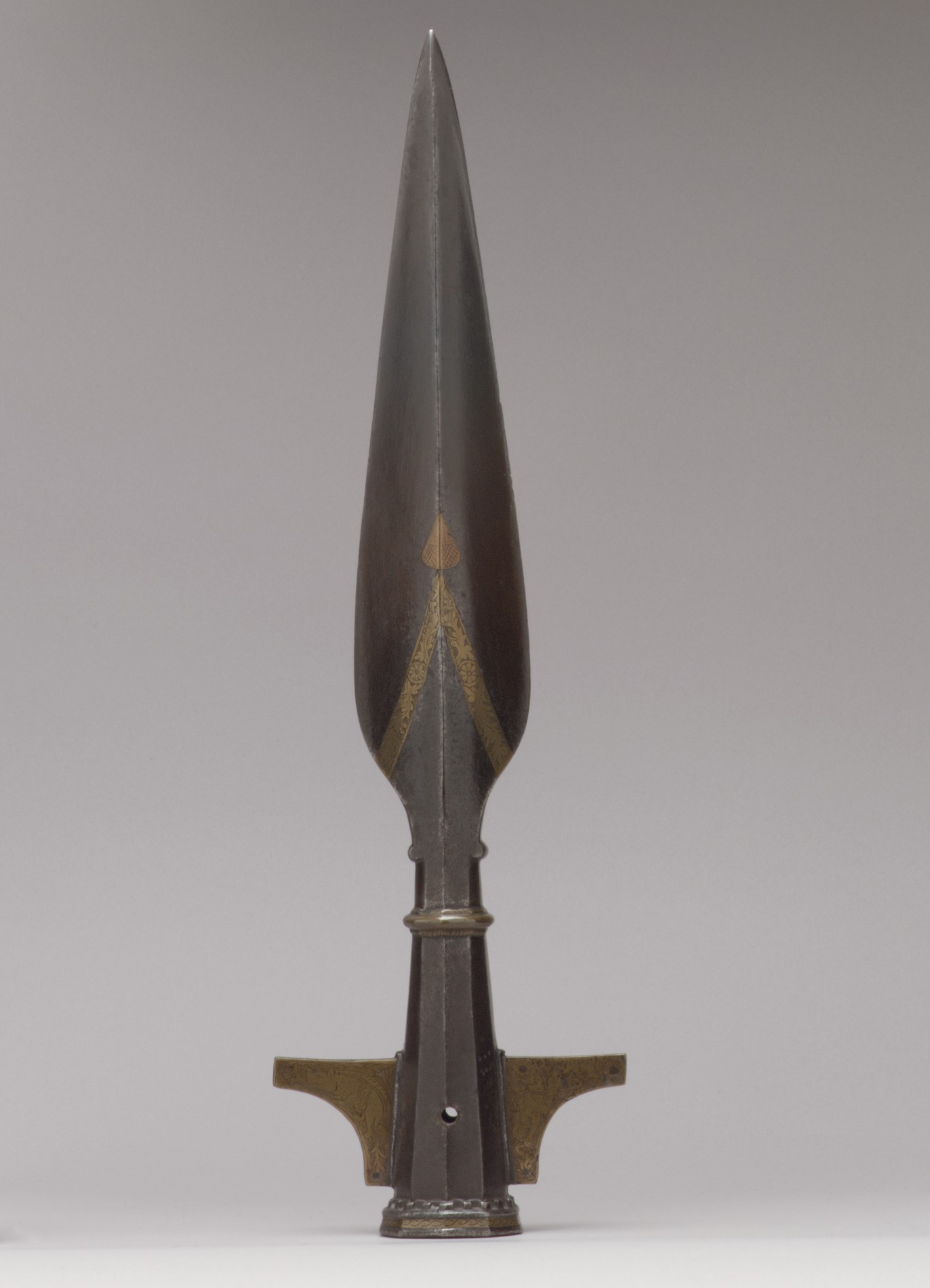
A hunting spear from Germany or Austria, c. 1425–50.

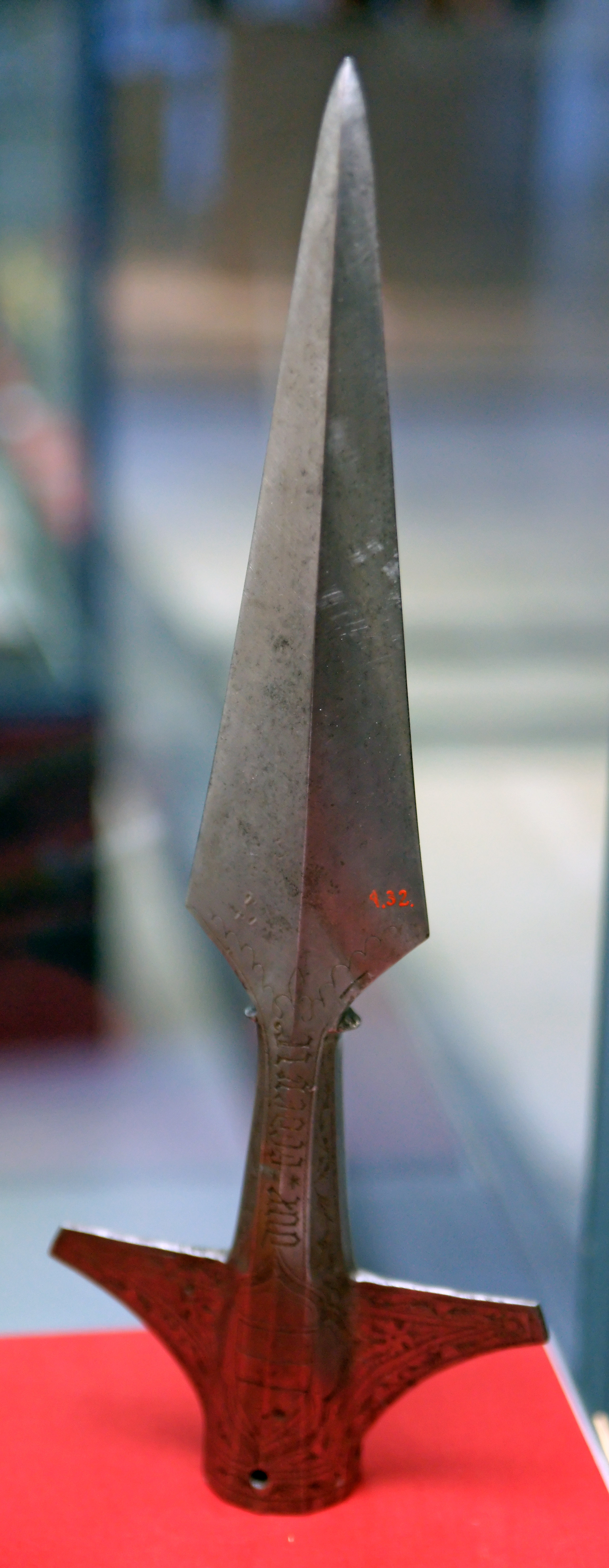
Boar spear head, c. 1430, length 42 centimeters (17 in).

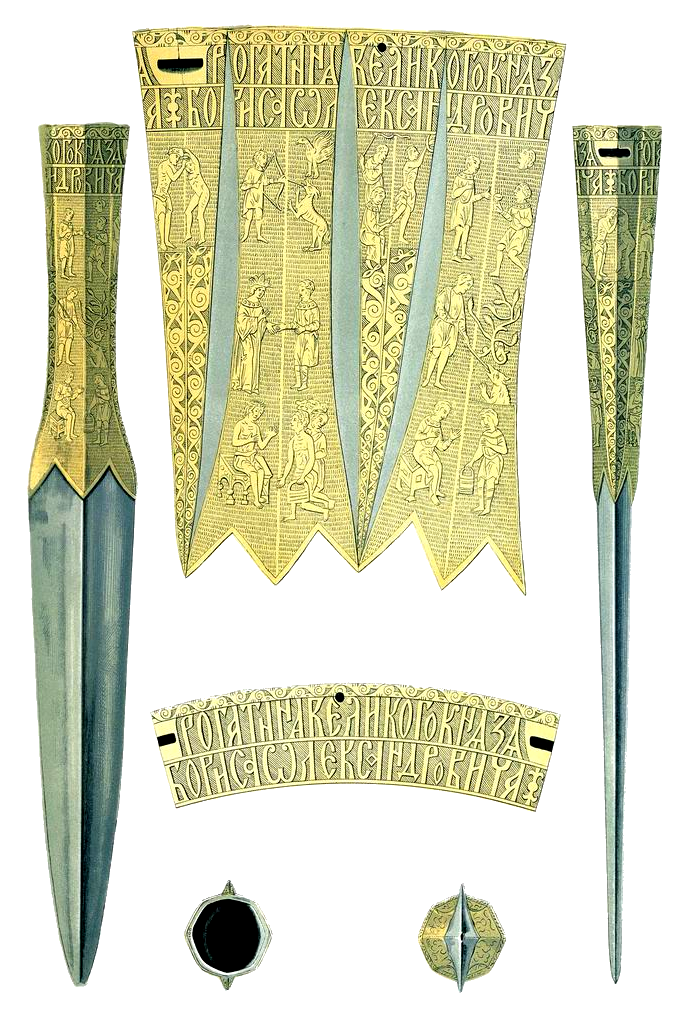
The rogatina of Boris of Tver

== See also ==
- Bohemian earspoon
- Ahlspiess
