= Buttenheim =

Town in Bavaria, Germany

- Municipality
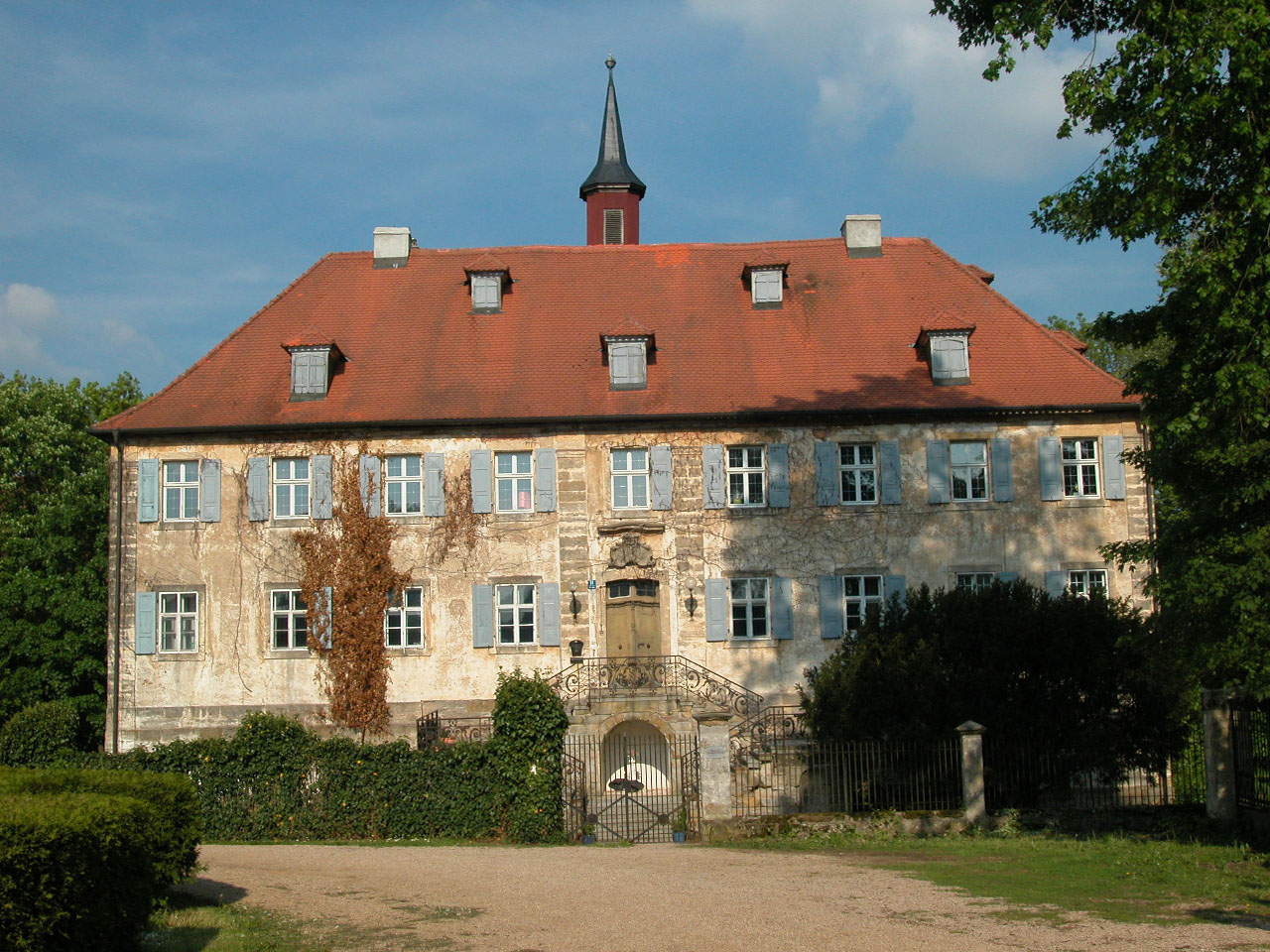
- Buttenheim Castle

- Coat of arms

- Location of Buttenheim within Bamberg district
- Interactive map of Buttenheim
- Location within Germany Location within Bavaria
- Coordinates: 49°48′15″N 11°1′55″E
- Country: Germany
- State: Bavaria
- Admin. region: Oberfranken
- District: Bamberg
- First mentioned: 1017

Government
  - Mayor (2020–26): Michael Karmann (CSU)

Area
  - Total: 30.07 km^{2} (11.61 sq mi)
- Elevation: 273 m (896 ft)

Population (2025-12-31)
  - Total: 3,680
  - Density: 122/km^{2} (317/sq mi)
- Time zone: UTC+01:00 (CET)
  - Summer (DST): UTC+02:00 (CEST)
- Postal codes: 96155
- Dialling codes: 09545
- Vehicle registration: BA
- Website: www.buttenheim.de

Buttenheim (German pronunciation: [ˈbʊtn̩haɪm]) is a market town in the Upper Franconian district of Bamberg and lies in the Regnitz Valley between Bamberg and Nuremberg, Germany.

Buttenheim is Levi Strauss's birthplace: the future inventor of blue jeans emigrated from Germany to the United States in 1847.

== Constituent municipalities ==
The market town of Buttenheim has the following constituent municipalities:

- Buttenheim, the namesake municipality
- Dreuschendorf
- Frankendorf
- Gunzendorf
- Hochstall
- Kälberberg
- Ketschendorf bei Buttenheim
- Senftenberg
- Stackendorf
- Tiefenhöchstadt

== History ==
Buttenheim – "Botho's Home" – had its first documentary mention in 1017. It lies on the north-south Regnitz Valley transport axis and was probably founded about 550. During a river journey from Forchheim to Würzburg in 793, Charlemagne ordered churches to be built in the Regnitz area to convert the Slavs. It is assumed that one of Charlemagne's 14 "Slavic Churches", which were built about 800 in the Radenzgau (a county roughly corresponding to today's Upper Franconia), stood in Buttenheim.

Until the mid-17th century, Buttenheim was the most important place between Bamberg and Forchheim. Through Buttenheim ran the old trade road from Regensburg to Bamberg/Hallstadt and on to Magdeburg. Furthermore, the Saxon Road, another old connection, this one east-west, ran from the Steigerwald forest by way of Hirschaid to "Franconian Switzerland". Parts of that road are still used, having been incorporated into the modern road Staatsstraße 2260.

The Lords of Schlüsselberg, who had their first documentary mention in 1304, were resident in Buttenheim and until 1762 held an estate, the court and lordship over the village. These, however, later belonged to the Barons of Seefried. By the Act of the Confederation of the Rhine in 1806, the municipality passed to Bavaria.

=== Population development ===
Within municipal limits, 2,619 inhabitants were counted in 1970, 2,786 in 1987 and 3,092 in 2000. In early 2005 it was 3,442.

== Politics ==
The municipality's politics is dominated by a coalition that calls itself the CSU /Zum Wohl der Gemeinde/Neue Wählergemeinschaft and furnishes the mayor. The SPD and FDP are not represented on municipal council, but instead various other voter municipalities are, such as Bürgerblock Gunzendorf, WG Dreuschendorf, WG Ketschendorf or WG Frankendorf.

In 1999, municipal tax revenue amounted to €1,896,000 of which business taxes (net) amounted to €789,000.

=== Coat of arms ===
Buttenheim's arms might heraldically be described thus: Party per pale, dexter party per fess argent and sable, in argent a boar spear gules per pale, sinister in argent the chief gules, thereunder a knife azure per pale.

The black and silver half of the shield is a reduced form of the arms borne by the old Lords of Stiebar, who were resident in Buttenheim. Their arms were parted and out of the parting line sprouted a Schweinsfeder ("swine's feather" – a spearlike war weapon somewhat similar to the boar spear mentioned in the blazon, which itself in German has a similar name: Saufeder, or "sow's feather") with a golden bend.

The tinctures gules and argent (red and silver) are the old Bamberg High Monastery's colours. This monastery had holdings in the municipality. The blue knife is an attribute of Saint Bartholomew, the patron saint of the Buttenheim church.

== Culture and sightseeing ==
=== Breweries ===
In Buttenheim there are currently two breweries, St-Georgen-Bräu and Löwenbräu; the outlying centres of Gunzendorf and Dreuschendorf each have one brewery.

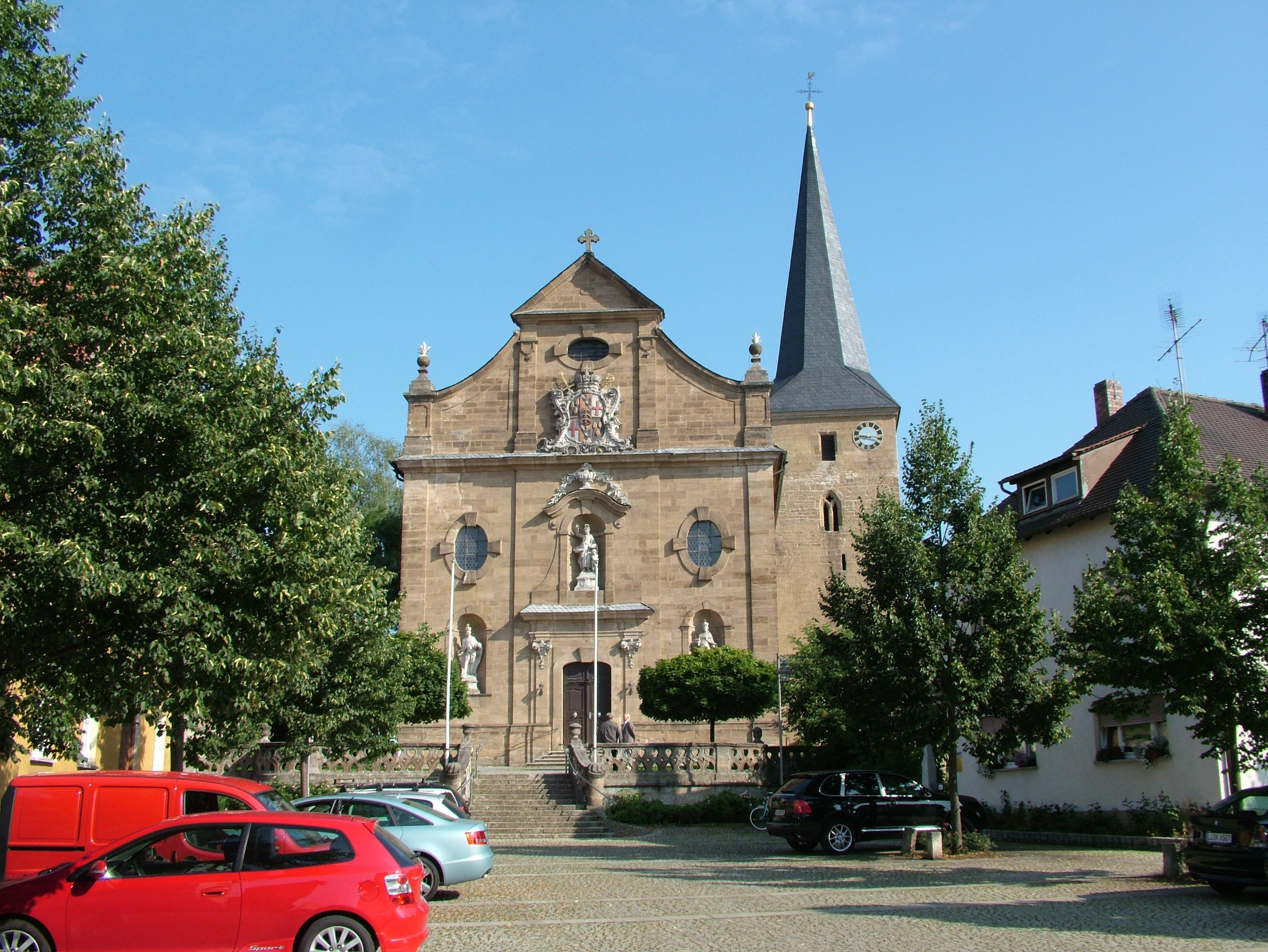
St. Bartholomew's Parish Church in Buttenheim

=== Parish church in Buttenheim ===
The Pfarrkirche St. Bartholomäus in Buttenheim was likely among the 14 "Slavic Churches" built in the Radenzgau by the Bishop of Würzburg at Charlemagne's behest.

=== Schloss Buttenheim ===
In Buttenheim, two castles were once to be found: the Oberes Schloss ("Upper Castle", also called Deichselburg) and the Unteres Schloss ("Lower Castle"). Both were owned by the Imperial Barons of Stiebar, who further owned three others in Aisch, Pretzfeld and Ermreuth. The Stiebar noble family can be traced back to 1253 and belonged to the former knighthood of the canton of Gebürg, which was under direct Imperial authority, and which stretched among Kronach, Nuremberg, Buttenheim and Kulmbach. This noble family put many abbesses, Teutonic Knights and capitulars in the High Monasteries of Bamberg and Würzburg. Between 1377 and 1560, at least fourteen members of this family were capitulars in the High Monasteries of Bamberg and Würzburg.

The Oberes Schloss (square with wall and four corner towers) was burnt down during the German Peasants' War in 1525 and never built again.

The castle that still stands today in Buttenheim is the so-called Unteres Schloss, which originally served the von Lichtenstein family as a bower, was taken over by the Stiebars, along with other pieces of real estate in Buttenheim in 1438.

The Stiebars had at their disposal in Buttenheim at that time jurisdiction over life and death, having inherited this from the von Schlüsselbergs. Under the Stiebars' ownership, the Lower Castle was burnt down several times: in 1492 in "bloody feud between Albrecht Stiebar the Younger and Prince-Bishop Heinrich III of Bamberg", in 1525 by "rebellious people from out of town" and once again in 1561 through a castle servant's carelessness when he went to bed, forgetting to put the light in his room out. Hans Joachim von Stiebar, who in 1574 was elected to the First Knightly Council (Erster Ritterrat) of the canton of Gebürg for the Bamberg and Forchheim area, thereby enjoying great prestige, repaired the damage.

The Stiebars embraced Lutheranism quite early on, as witnessed by, among other things, the appointment of an Evangelical preacher at Schloss Buttenheim, which was mentioned in a document as early as 1591.

In 1630, the Stiebars were stripped of their holdings at Imperial behest for having taken part in the Protestant Union's struggles, putting Buttenheim, and thereby the Lower Castle, under Prince Georg Ludwig von Schwarzenberg's ownership. The Stiebars, however, got their belongings back in 1648 under the Peace of Westphalia.

In 1741, the chapel, which still stands today, was built next to the rubble of the castle, which had been destroyed by war. The castle lords, however, had to live in a side building.

In 1762, with Imperial Baron Johann Georg Christoph Wilhelm von Stiebar's death, this noble family's main Franconian line died out. Their fiefdom went to the High Monasteries of Bamberg and Würzburg, and also partly back to the Duchy of Saxe-Coburg. Ownership stayed with the heirs, the widow and the daughters.

In 1761 the Kammerjunker (variously translated as "page" or "chamberlain") Wilhelm Christian Friedrich von Seefried wed Elisabeth Sofie von Stiebar, whom he had come to know while he was a student of jurisprudence in Erlangen. A few years later, they moved to Buttenheim. Since the Lower Castle "...had been destroyed or wiped out by fire (down to) the mediaeval, massive, square tower topped with a mansard roof...", Wilhelm Christian Friedrich von Seefried built the current Baroque castle in 1774 onto the one tower that still stood, and in which is still found the Evangelical castle chapel.

Wilhelm Christian saw to it that the Evangelical castle parish was newly confirmed. In 1790, Wilhelm Christian, who had set himself all his life to strengthening the Evangelical faith, was raised to the Imperial Barony. In 1814, a "Protestant castle parish" from the "Castle Chaplaincy" was consecrated, and on 27 August 1826, the castle chapel was consecrated as a communal House of God.

Even today, the castle chapel still serves the Buttenheim Evangelical parish, which since that time has been put in the care of the parish of Hirschaid, as a House of God.

Since Wilhelm Christian's time, the castle has been occupied almost uninterruptedly by his descendants.

=== Curacy Church in Gunzendorf ===
From the Baroque Kuratie-Kirche St. Nikolaus begins the Georgiritt (roughly "George's Ride") to the Senftenberg, a nearby mountain.

=== Senftenberg with St. George's Chapel ===
The Baroque municipality chapel of St. George on the Senftenberg is the destination of the Georgiritt.

=== "Golden Village" of Frankendorf with climbing park ===
Frankendorf, a village of timber-frame houses, became the winner of the contest Unser Dorf soll schöner werden ("Our village ought to become lovelier") in 1981. The district evaluation jury came to this conclusion in 1980:

The almost fully preserved timber-frame ensemble with its 31 one-floor farmers houses under memorial protection is without peer in Upper Franconia.

It goes on to say:

The townsfolk's municipality spirit and readiness to sacrifice were always exemplary for the district.

About the landscape, this was stated:

Orchards green the place in exemplary fashion; the valley is covered with groves of trees. The transition to free landscape is fluid.

=== Levi-Strauss-Museum ===
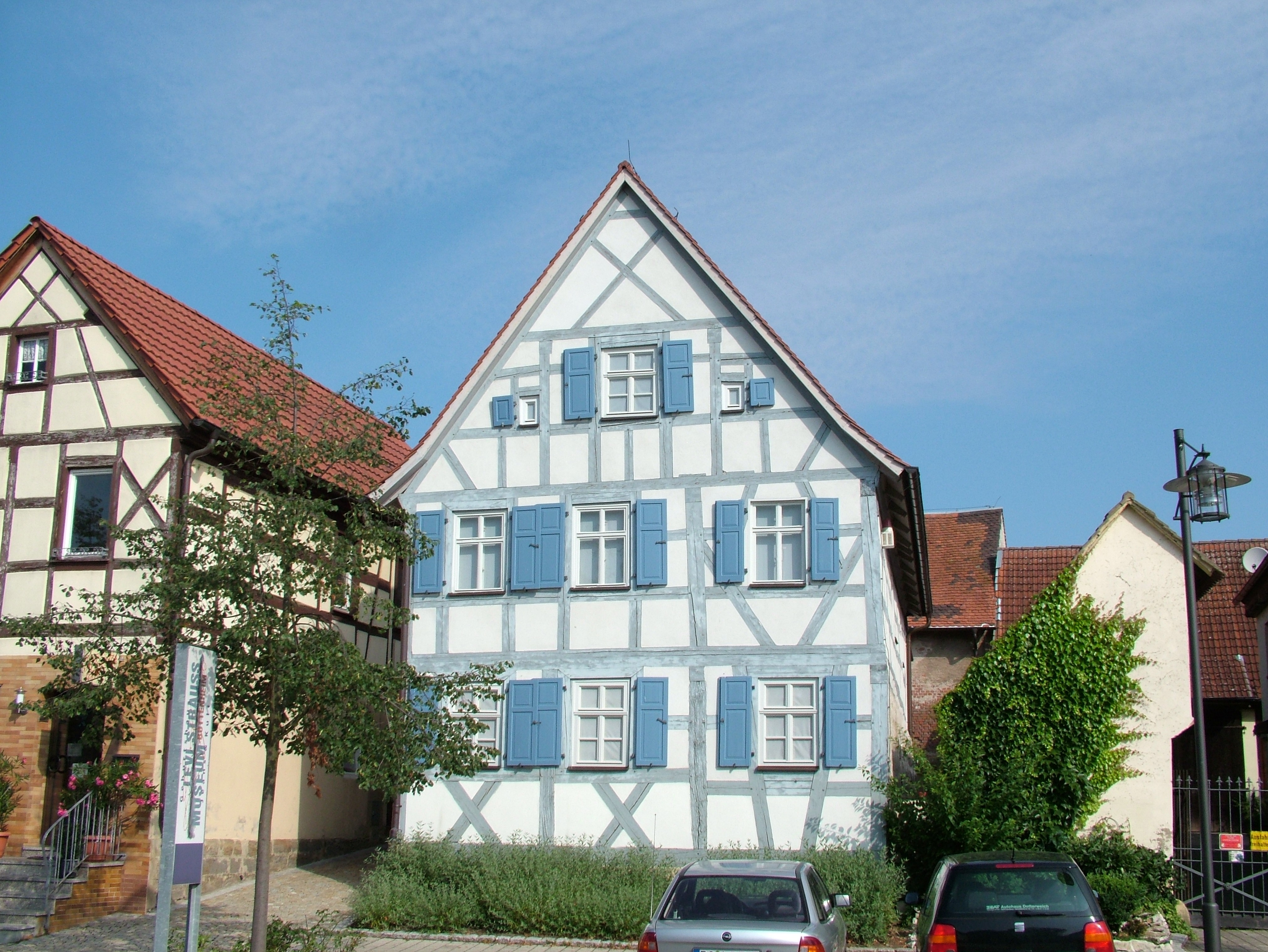
Levi-Strauss-Museum

Levi Strauss, the inventor of blue jeans was born in Buttenheim on 26 February 1829 as Löb Strauß. The house where he was born is now a museum. Built in 1687, the timber-frame structure was expanded in 1733 to house two families. Among the permanent exhibits can be seen the Strauss family's emigration documents and the publication of their emigration in the official journal.

=== Museums ===
The Kleines Haus der Kunst ("Little House of Art") shows paintings, graphics, sculpture and photographs by Eastern European artists.

=== Regular events ===
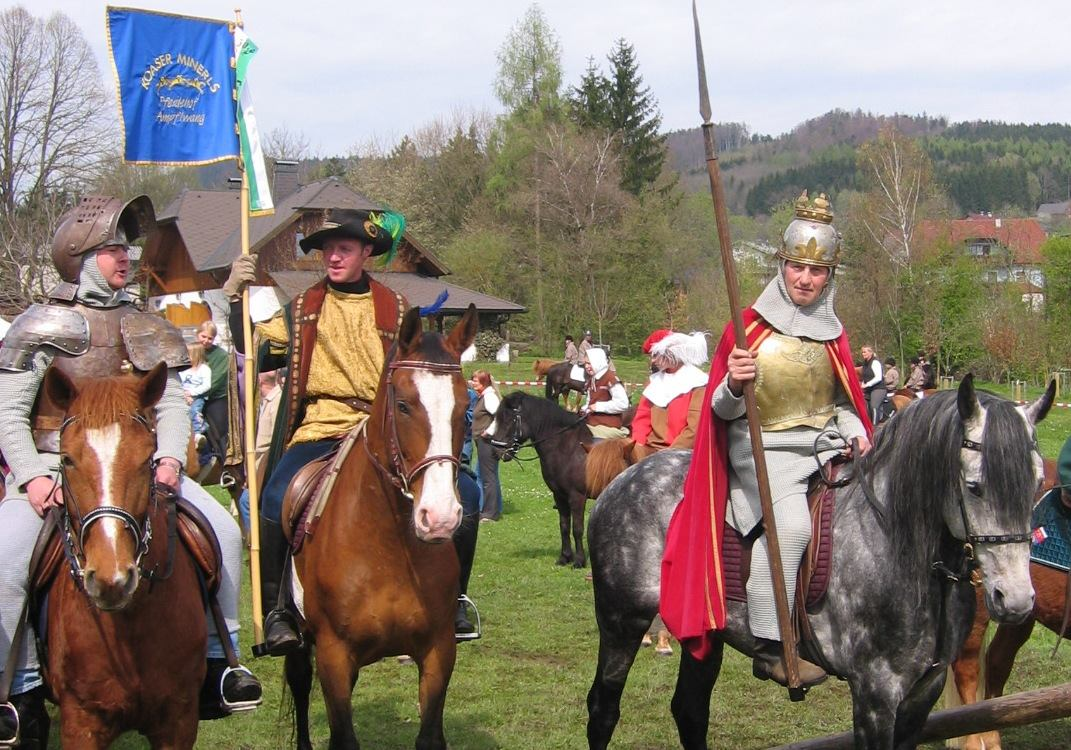
Georgiritt

The tradition-rich Georgiritt takes place on 23 April (Saint George's Day) and leads from Gunzendorf up onto the Senftenberg. This is a kind of pilgrimage to Saint George traditionally done on horseback.

== Economy and infrastructure ==
According to official statistics, there were 334 workers on the social welfare contribution rolls working in producing businesses in 1998, and in trade and transport 267. In other areas, 104 workers on the social welfare contribution rolls were employed, and 1,139 such workers worked from home. In processing businesses there were no businesses, and in construction three. Furthermore, in 1999, there were 75 agricultural operations with a working area of 1 661 ha, of which 1 226 ha was cropland and 429 ha was meadowland.

=== Transport ===
Buttenheim lies right on Bundesautobahn 73 with its own interchange and on the Bamberg–Nuremberg railway line with its own station.

=== Telecommunications ===
The 142-meter-tall Deutsche Telekom AG transmission tower, built in 1973 (49°51′10″N 11°3′37″E), stands on the Sommeranger Berg.

=== Education ===
In 1999, the following institutions existed in Buttenheim:

- 150 kindergarten places with 135 children
- Primary school with 15 teachers and 322 pupils

== Famous people ==
- Levi Strauss (1829–1902), German-American industrialist, company founder and inventor of blue jeans; born and grew up in Buttenheim
