= Tiefenhöchstadt =

Coordinates: 49°51′N 11°05′E

Tiefenhöchstadt is a small village located in Bavaria, Germany. It is in Upper Franconia, in the Bamberg district. Tiefenhöchstadt is a constituent community of Buttenheim.

In 2007, the village had a population of 90.

== Geography ==
A stream called the Deichselbach has its source near Tiefenhöchstadt, and then flows through the village.

The village has an elevation from 449 to 478 meters.

Tiefenhöchstadt lies in the nature park "Naturpark Fränkische Schweiz - Veldensteiner Forst."

== History ==
It is not clear how the name of the small village got the ending -stadt, or city. It is rumored that French soldiers during the Napoleonic Wars traveled to Tiefenhöchstadt, thinking it was a city where they could find accommodation.

== Church ==
A church in Tiefenhöchstadt was established in 1852; it was the first local chapel. The church has a Neogothic altar. The name of the church is the Kreuzerhöhung, or Holy Cross.

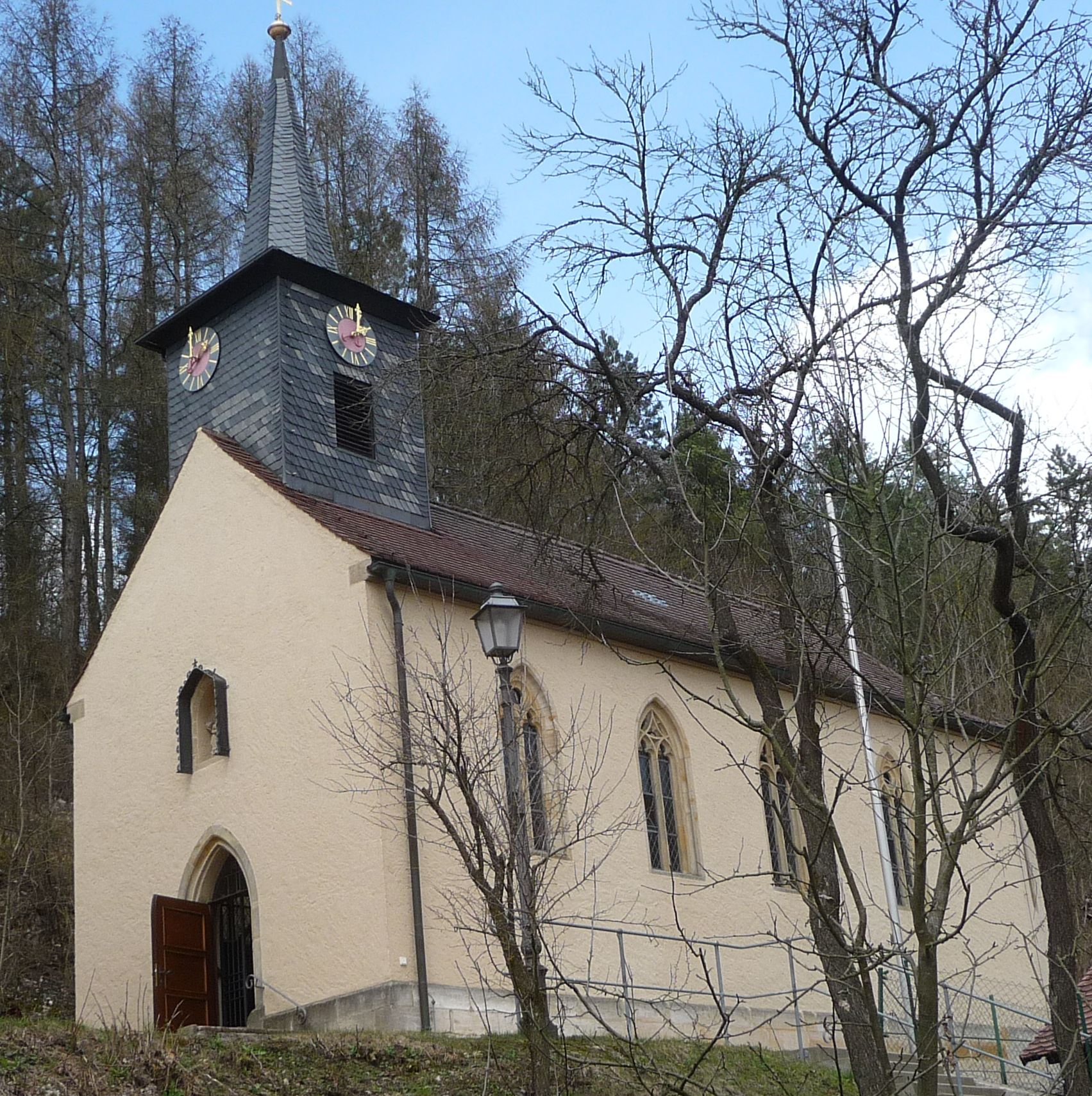
The church in Tiefenhöchstadt

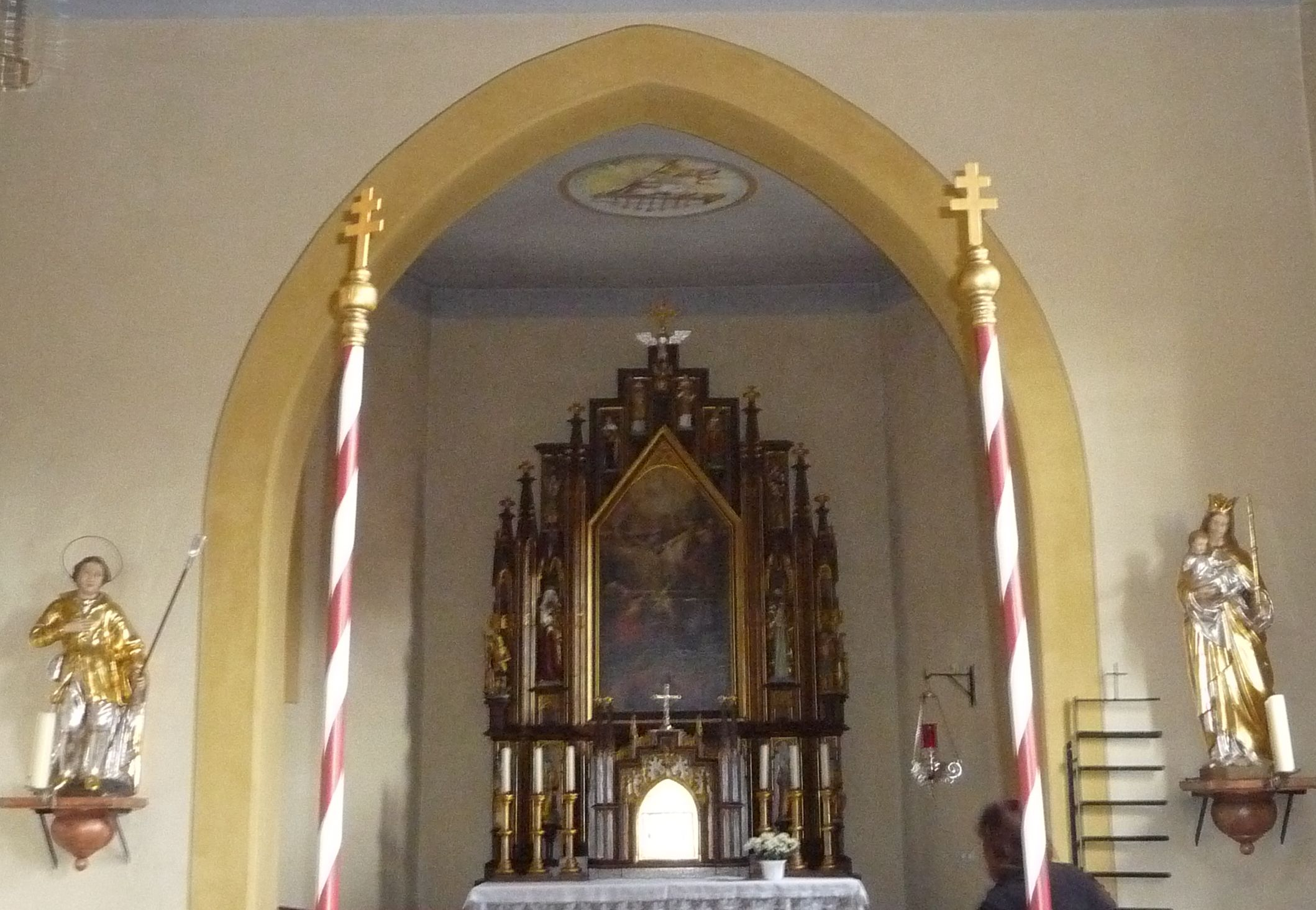
Altar of the church

== Culture ==
There are several community organizations in Tiefenhöchstadt:

- Volunteer Fire Department: "FFW-Tiefenhöchstadt"
- Women's Group: "Frauengruppe Tiefenhöchstadt"
