= Stackendorf (Buttenheim) =

Coordinates: 49°49′11″N 11°04′51″E

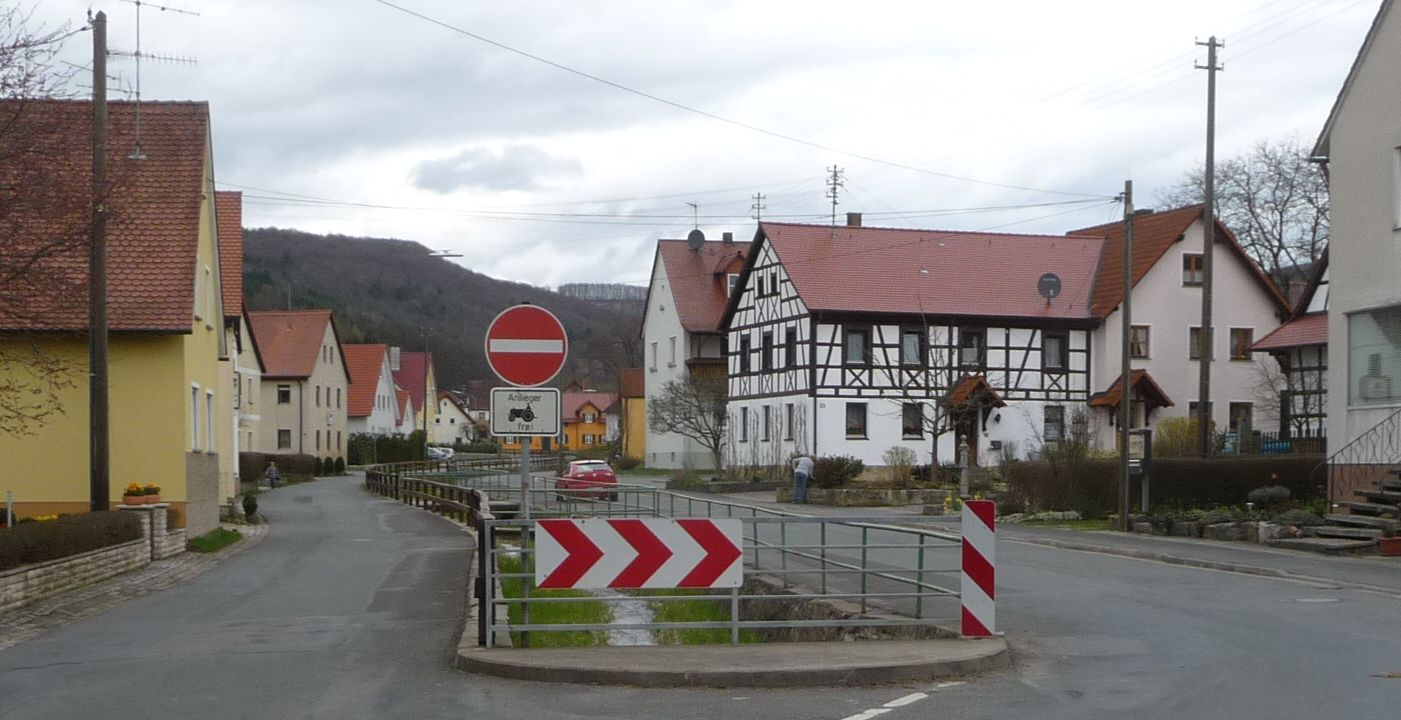
Stackendorf.

Stackendorf is a small village located in Bavaria, Germany. It is in Upper Franconia, in the Bamberg district. Stackendorf is a constituent community of Buttenheim. In 2007, it had a population of 270.

== Geography ==
A stream called the Deichselbach flows through the village.

The village has an elevation of about 400 meters.

Stackendorf lies in the nature park "Naturpark Fränkische Schweiz - Veldensteiner Forst."

== Culture ==
There are several community organizations in Tiefenhöchstadt:

- Horticulture Club: "Gartenbauverein Stackendorf"
- Volunteer Fire Department: "FFW-Stackendorf"
