= Ji (polearm) =

Chinese pole weapon

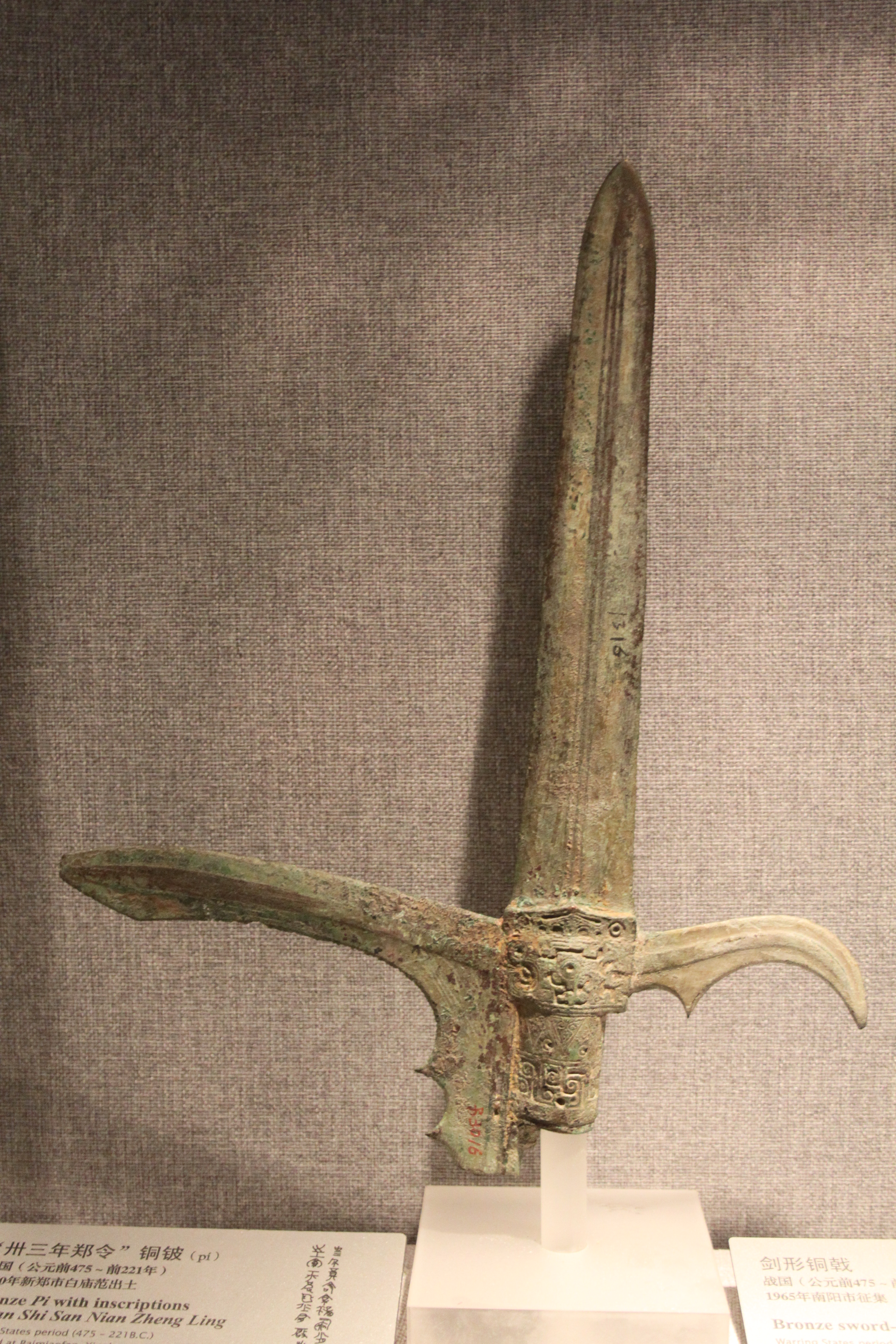
Eastern Zhou bronze ji

The ji (pronunciation: [tɕì] Chinese: 戟; pinyin: jǐ) was a Chinese polearm, sometimes translated into English as spear, dagger axe, or halberd, though they are conceptually different weapons. They were used in one form or another for over 3000 years, from at least as early as the Zhou dynasty, until the end of the Qing dynasty. They are still used for training in many Chinese martial arts.

== History ==
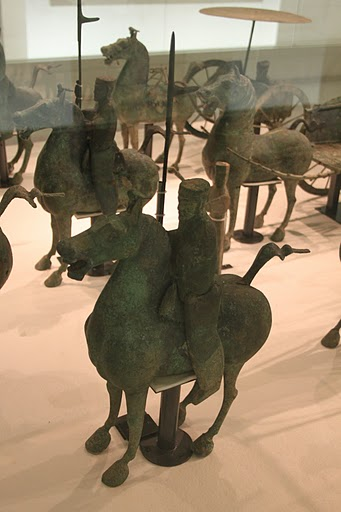
Bronze figurines of Eastern Han dynasty cavalry wielding a Han era ji.

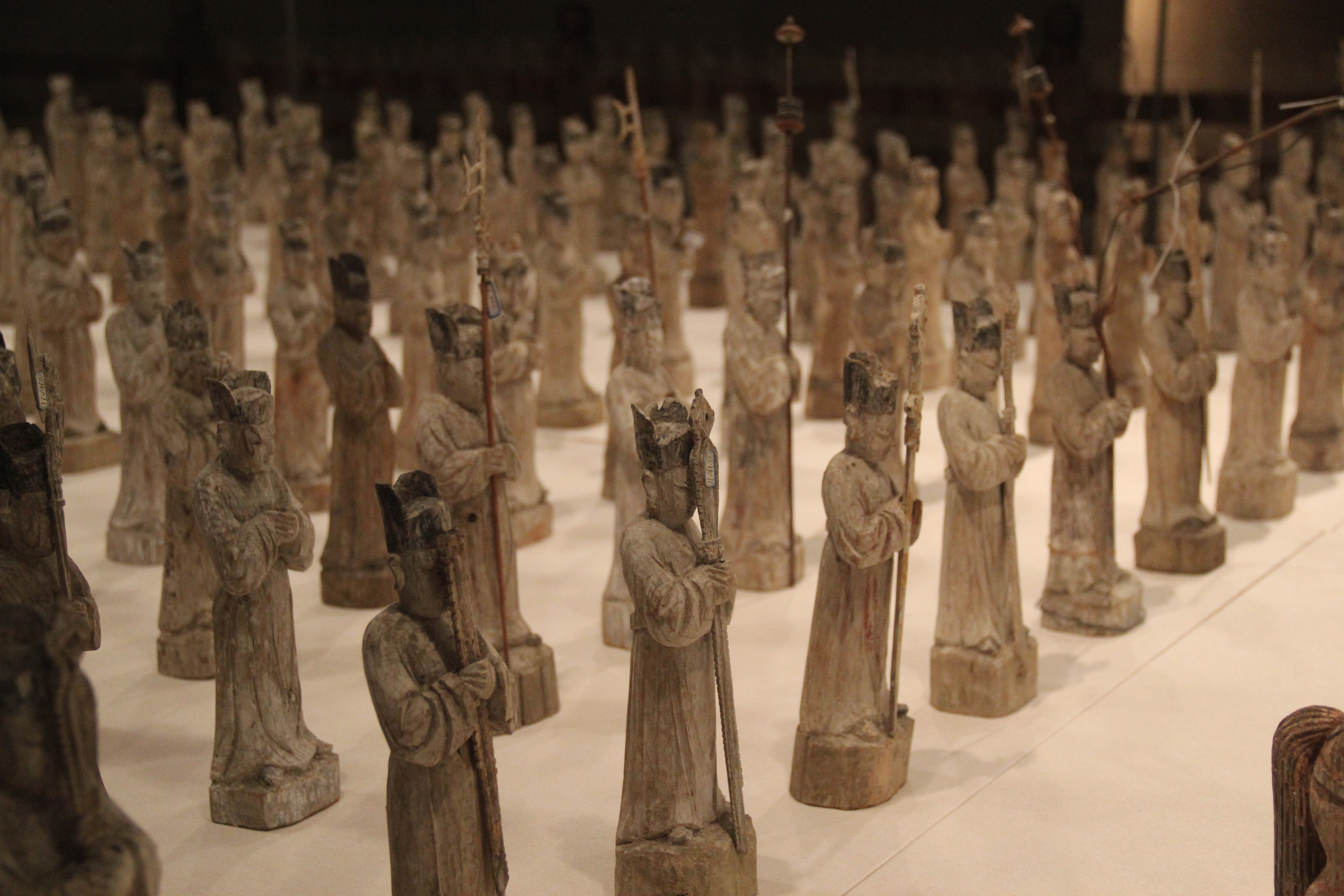
Pottery figurines carrying jis from the tomb of the Ming dynasty prince Zhu Tan, 10th son of the Hongwu Emperor

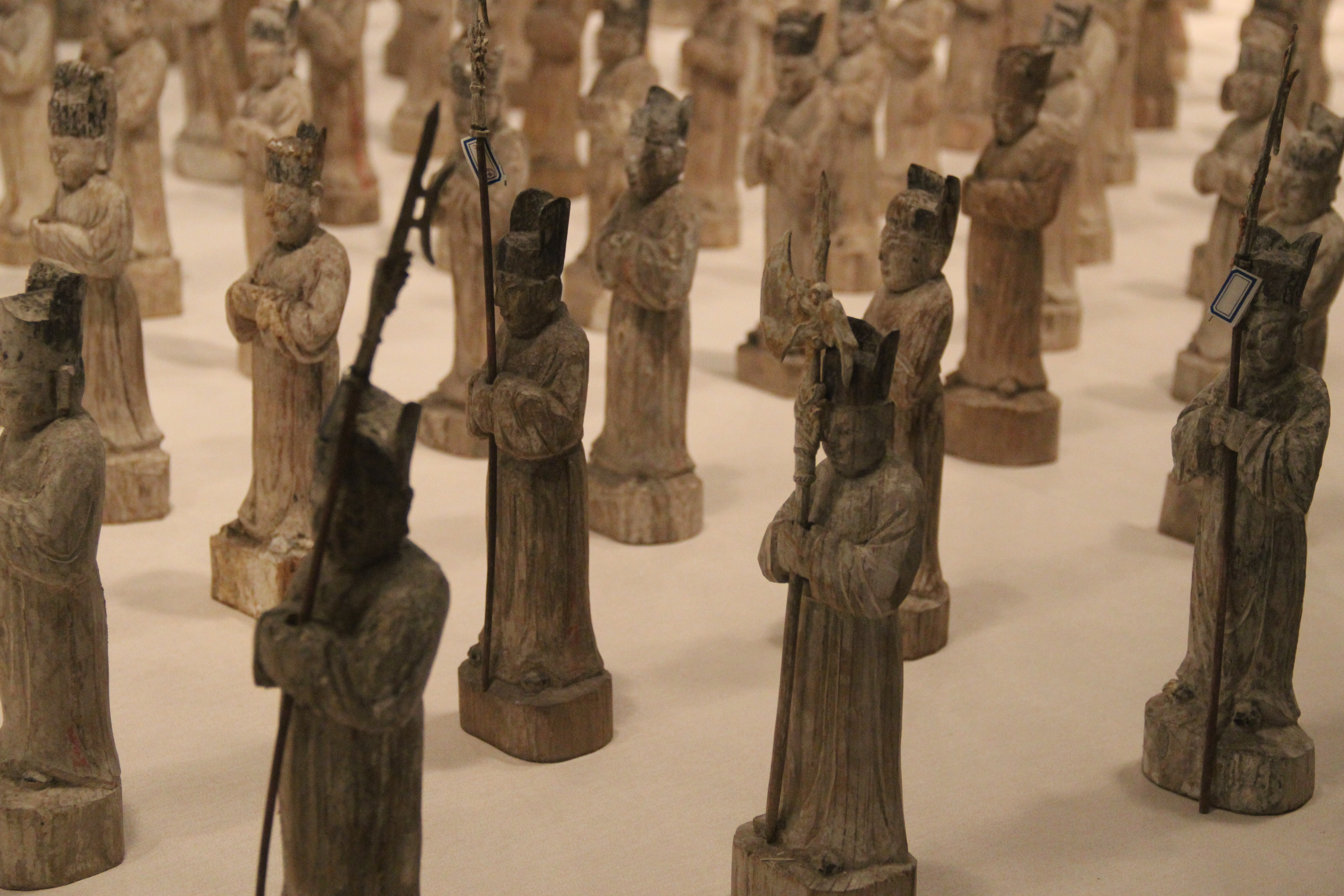
Pottery figurines carrying jis and a large axe from the tomb of Zhu Tan

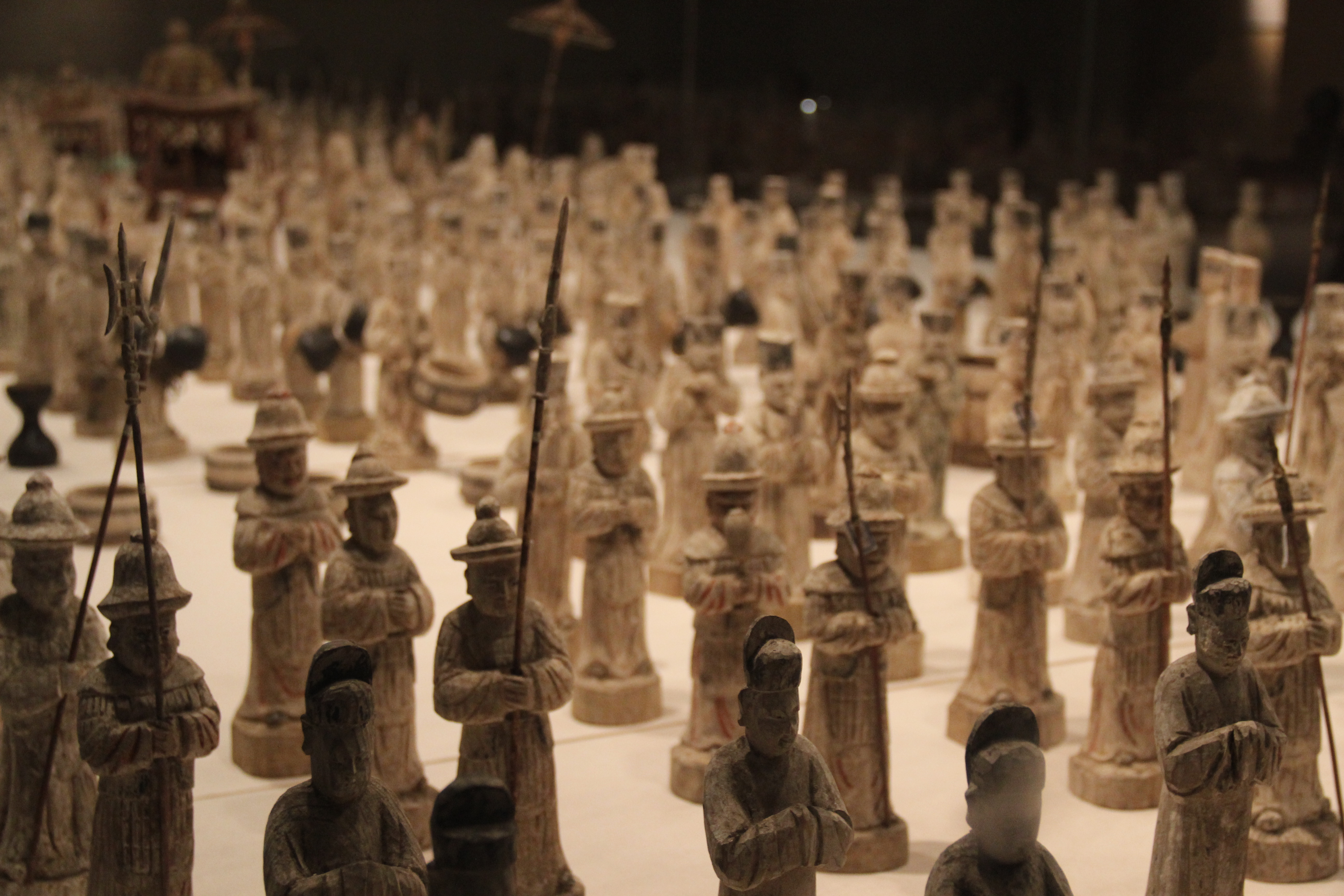
A double sided halberd on the left, from the tomb of Ming prince Zhu Tan

The ji was initially a hybrid between a spear and a dagger-axe. It was a relatively common infantry weapon in Ancient China, and was also used by cavalry and charioteers.

In the Song dynasty, several weapons were referred to as ji but developed from spears, not from ancient ji. One variety was called the qinglong ji (青龙戟; 青龍戟; 'cerulean dragon ji'), and had a spear tip with a crescent blade on one side. Another type was the fangtian ji (方天戟; 'square-sky ji'), which had a spear tip with crescent blades on both sides. They had multiple means of attack: the side blade or blades, the spear tip, plus often a rear counterweight that could be used to strike the opponent. The way the side blades were fixed to the shaft differs, but usually there were empty spaces between the pole and the side blade. The wielder could strike with the shaft, pulling the weapon back to hook with a side blade; or, he could slap his opponent with the flat side of the blade to knock him off his horse.

== Popular legend ==
One of the earliest known appearances of the ji in the historical record is the Fangtian Huaji (方天画戟; 方天畫戟; 'square-sky painted ji') attributed to the warrior Lü Bu in the Romance of the Three Kingdoms. It is unknown whether the peculiarity of his weapon was a literary device used by Luo Guanzhong, the author. Since this novel was based on earlier depictions of the era during the Song dynasty, the Song-era polearm may have been named based on its similarity to, or in honor of, the weapon that was attributed to Lü Bu in this famous novel. This would be comparable to the famous semi-mythological origin story of the yanyuedao, the weapon wielded by Guan Yu, another character from the novel and a real historical person. The first historical or archaeological evidence of this polearm comes from an 11th-century illustration in the military manual Wujing Zongyao. The yanyuedao came to be known as the guandao after its invention was anachronistically attributed to Guan Yu himself, due to his wielding the weapon throughout the Romance.

== Gallery ==
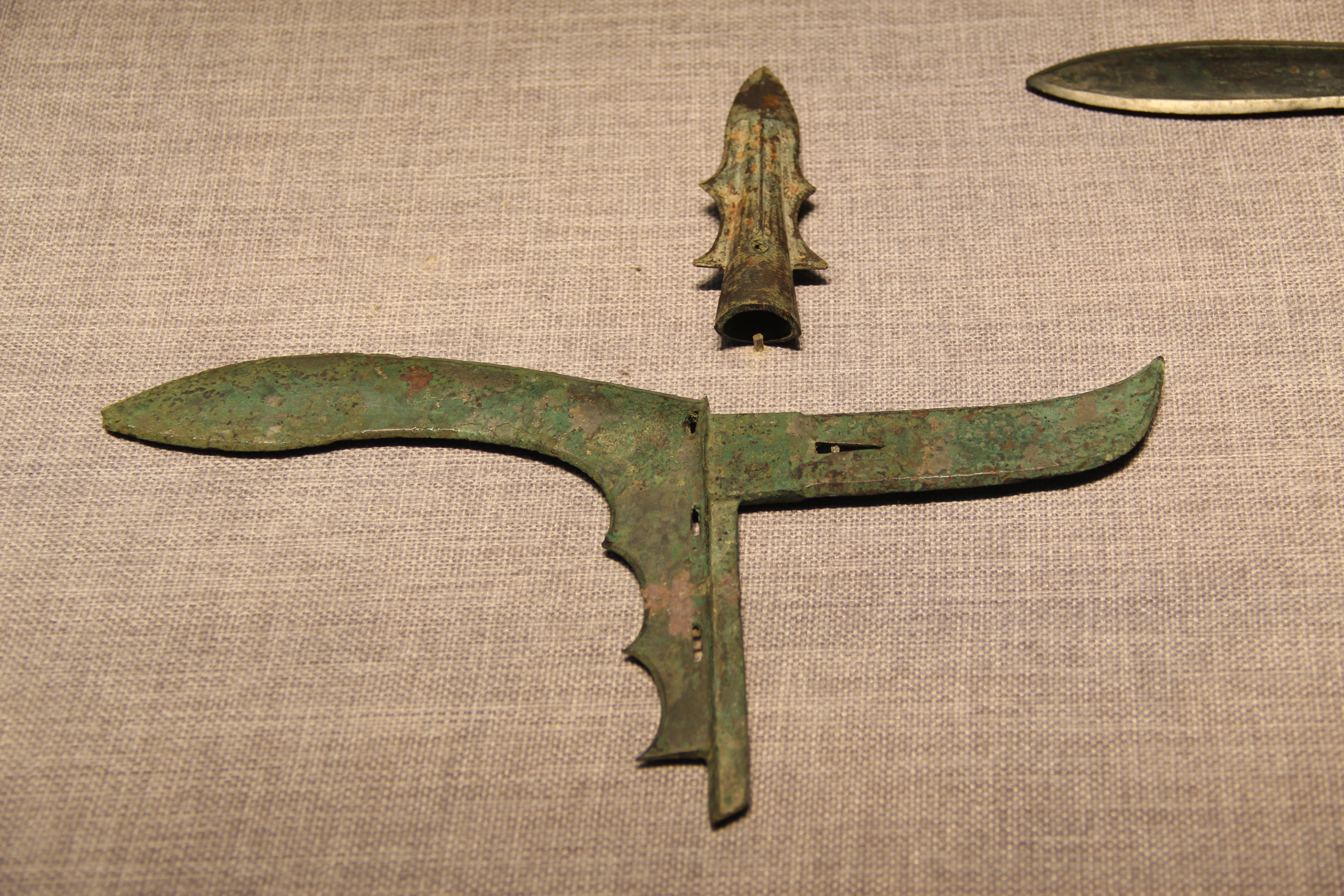
Scythed dagger-axe combined with a spear, forming a ji, Warring States period

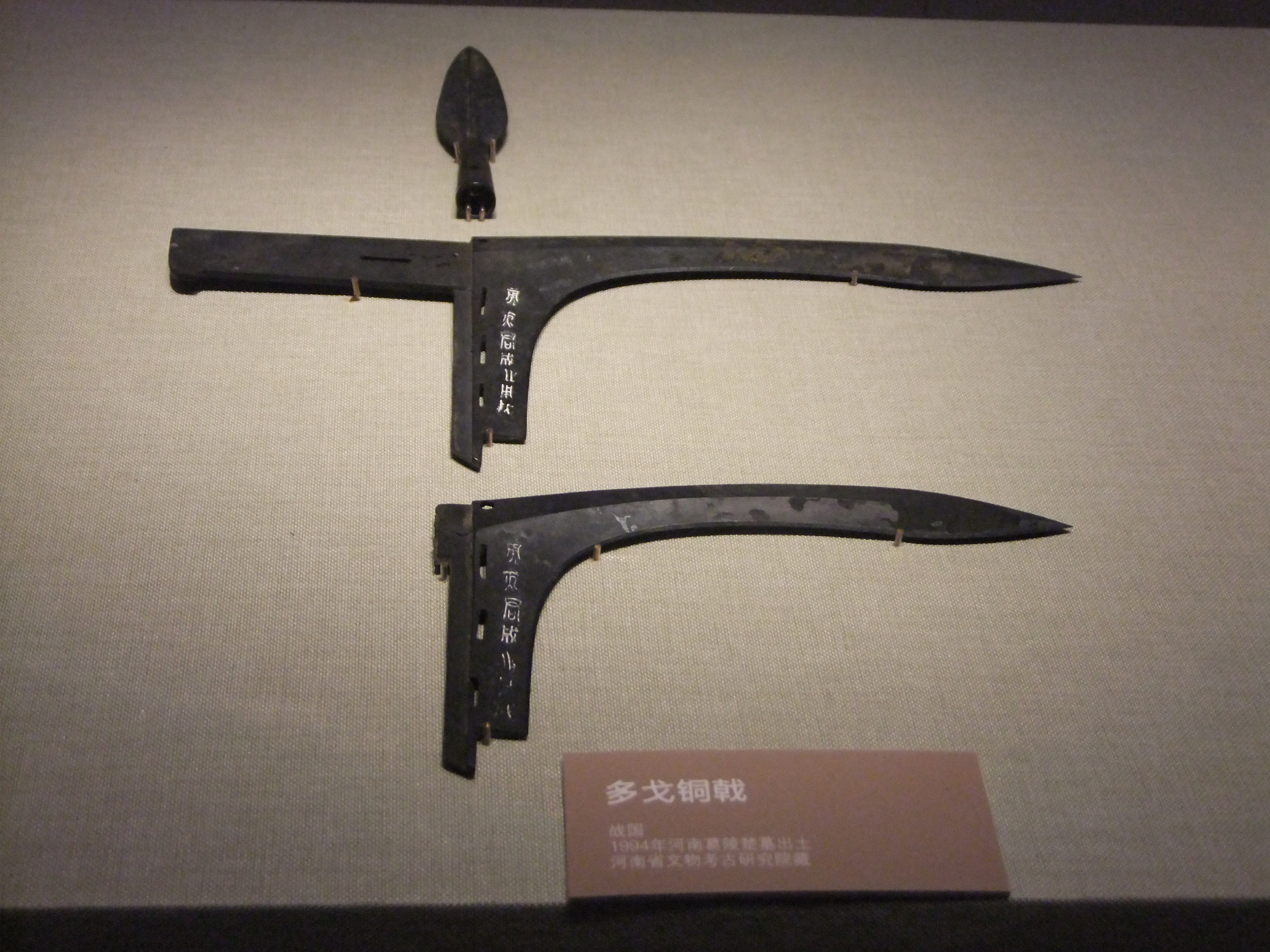
Double dagger-axe ji, Warring States period

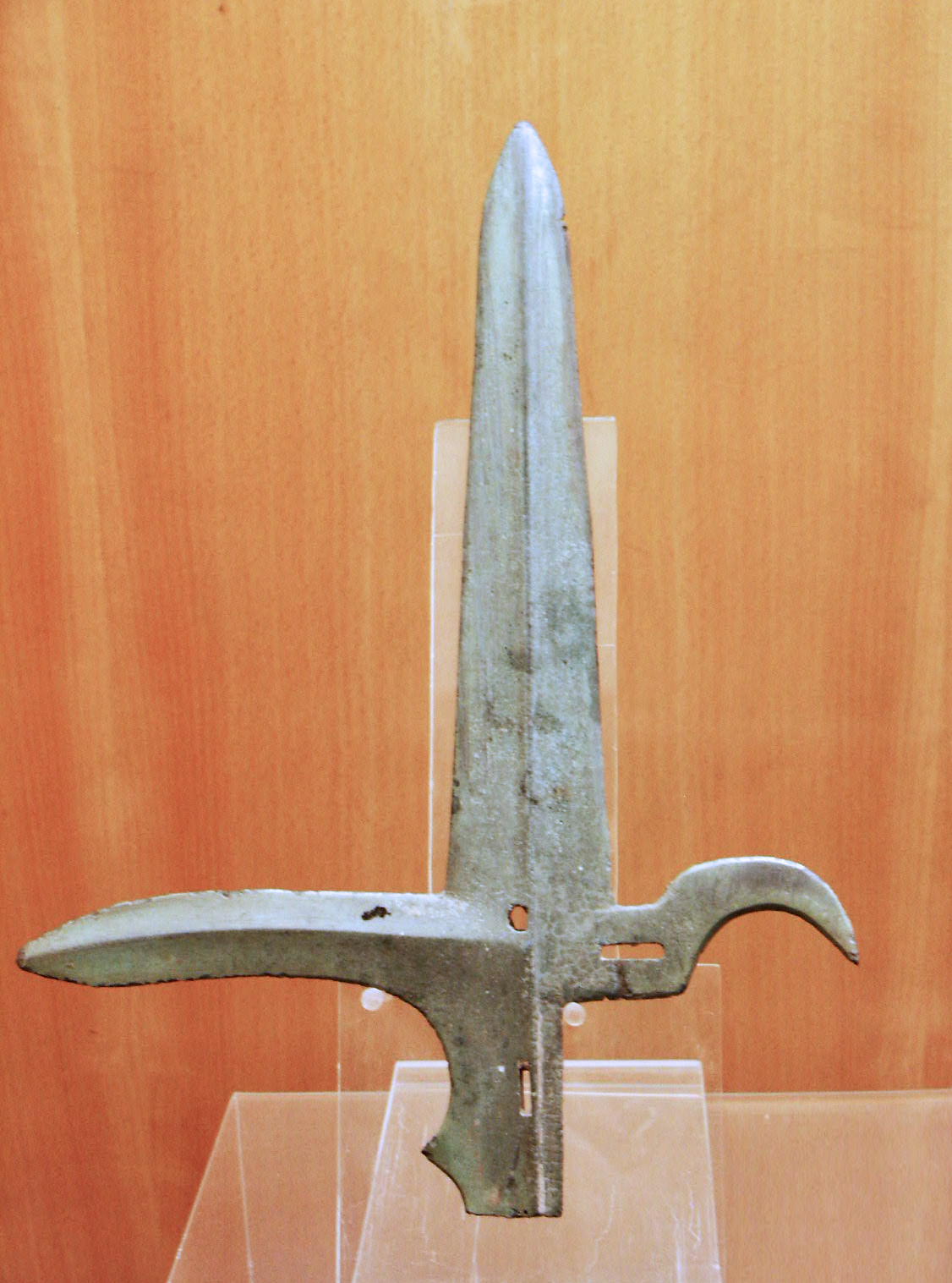
Ji with back hook, Eastern Zhou

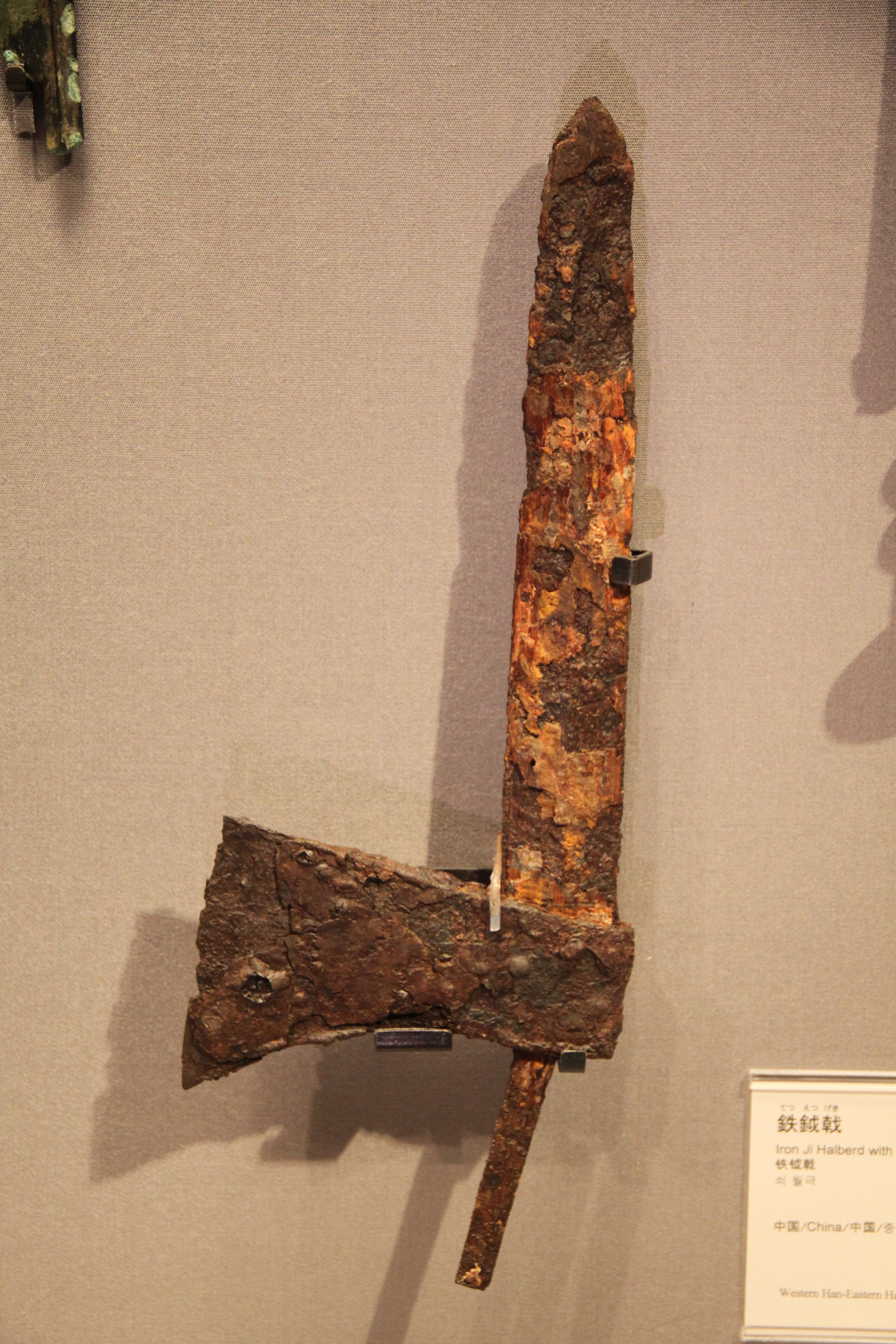
Axe halberd (yueji) variant, Han dynasty

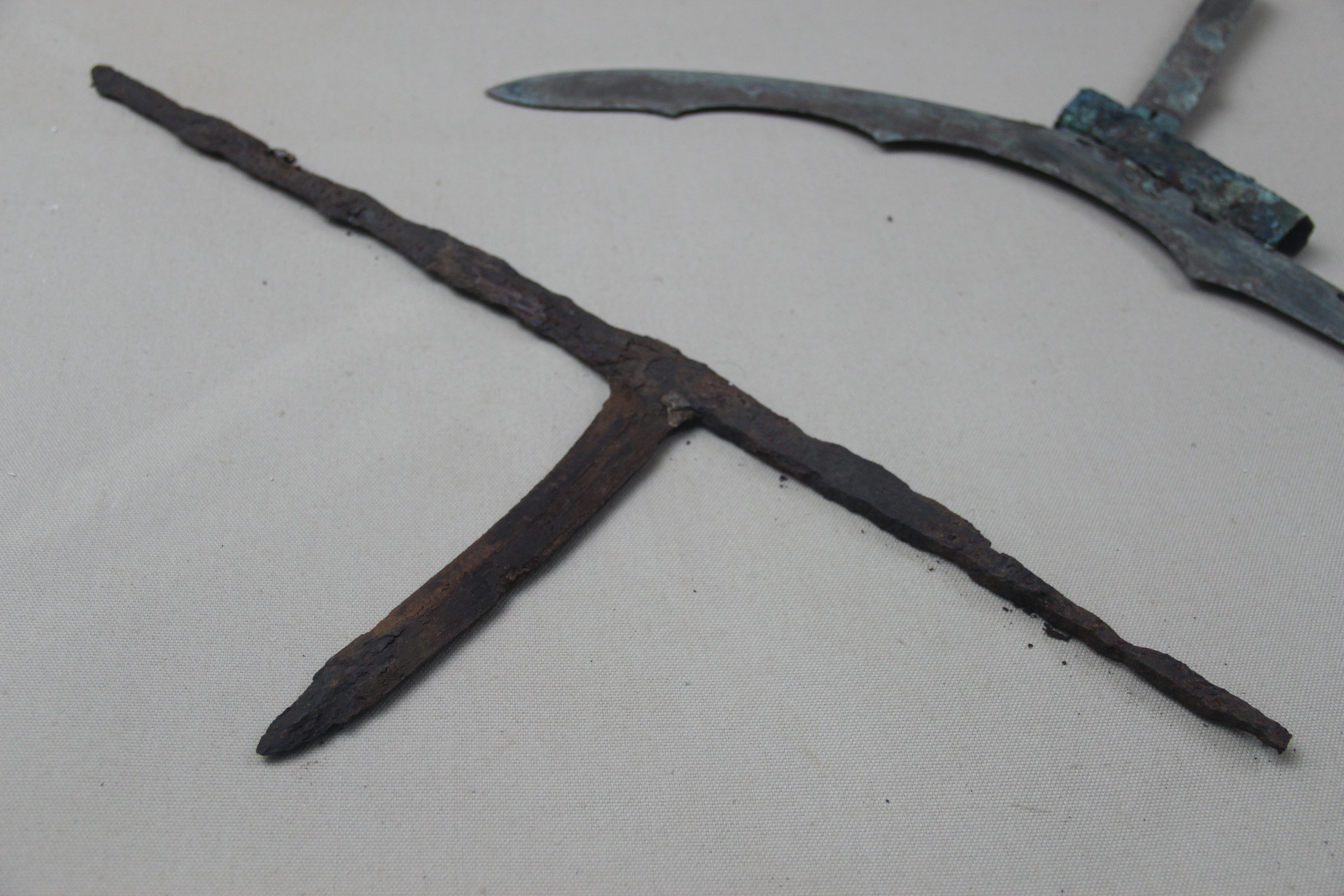
One piece ji, Han dynasty

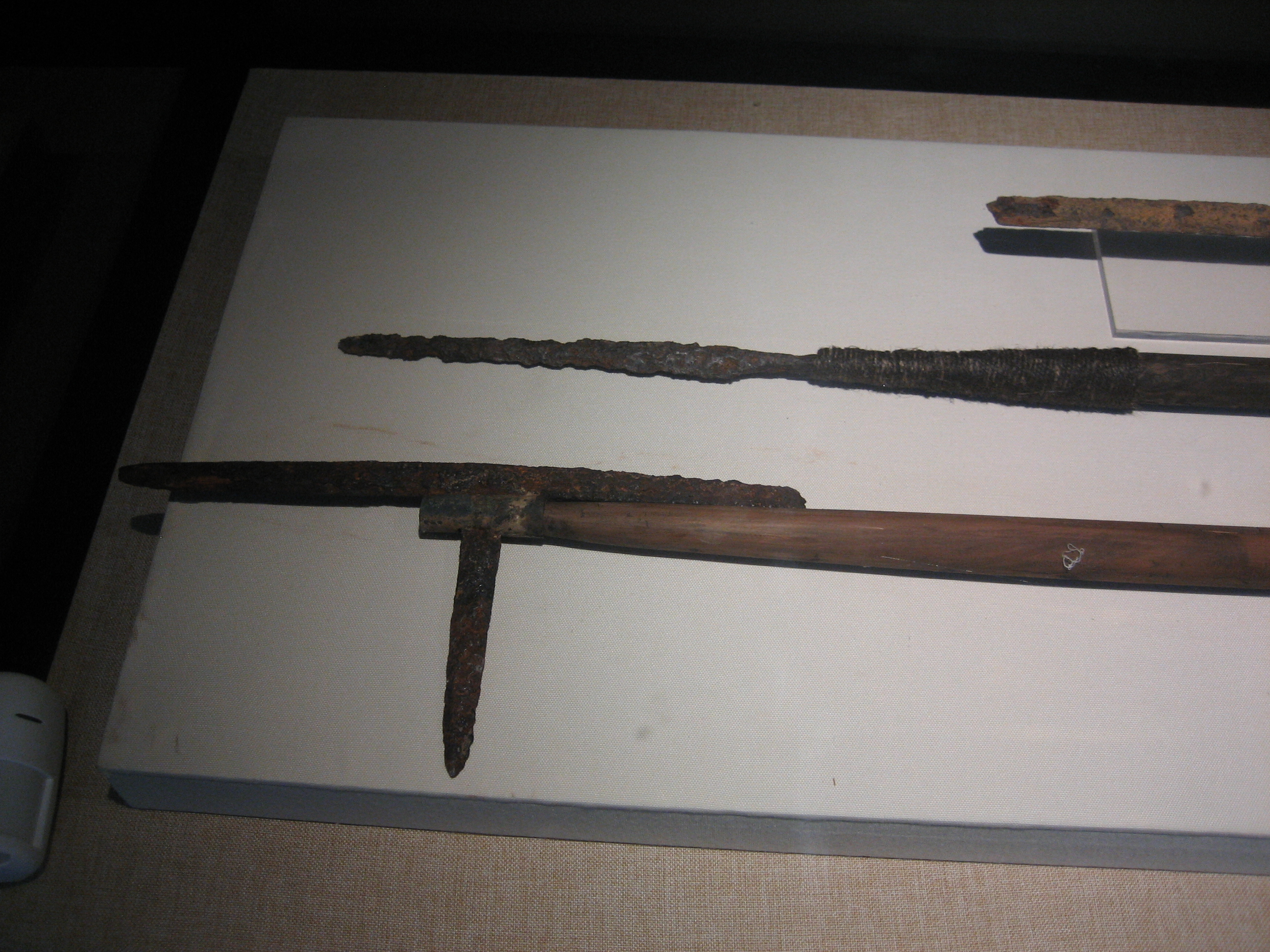
Ji, Han dynasty

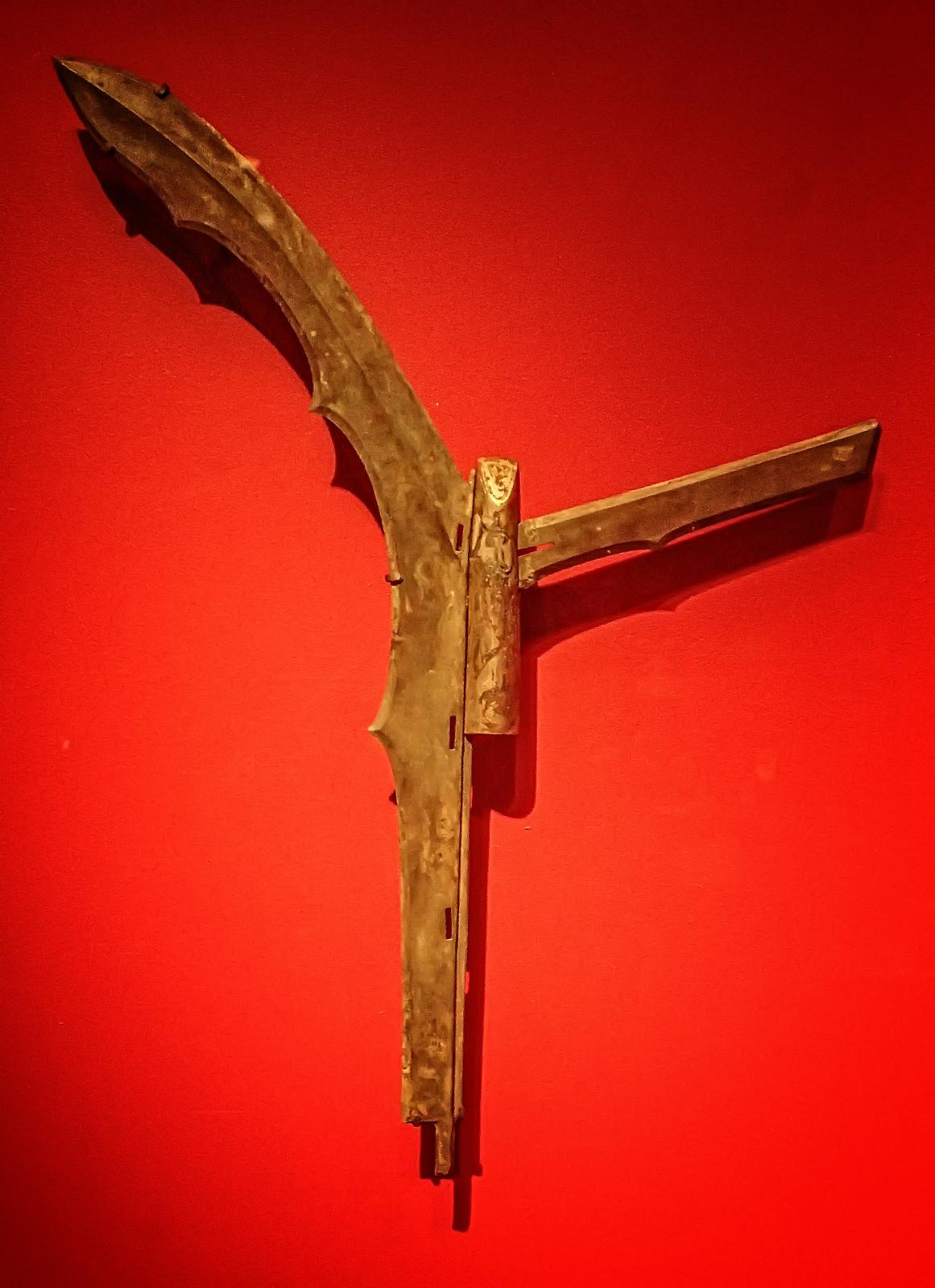
Ceremonial ji, Han dynasty.

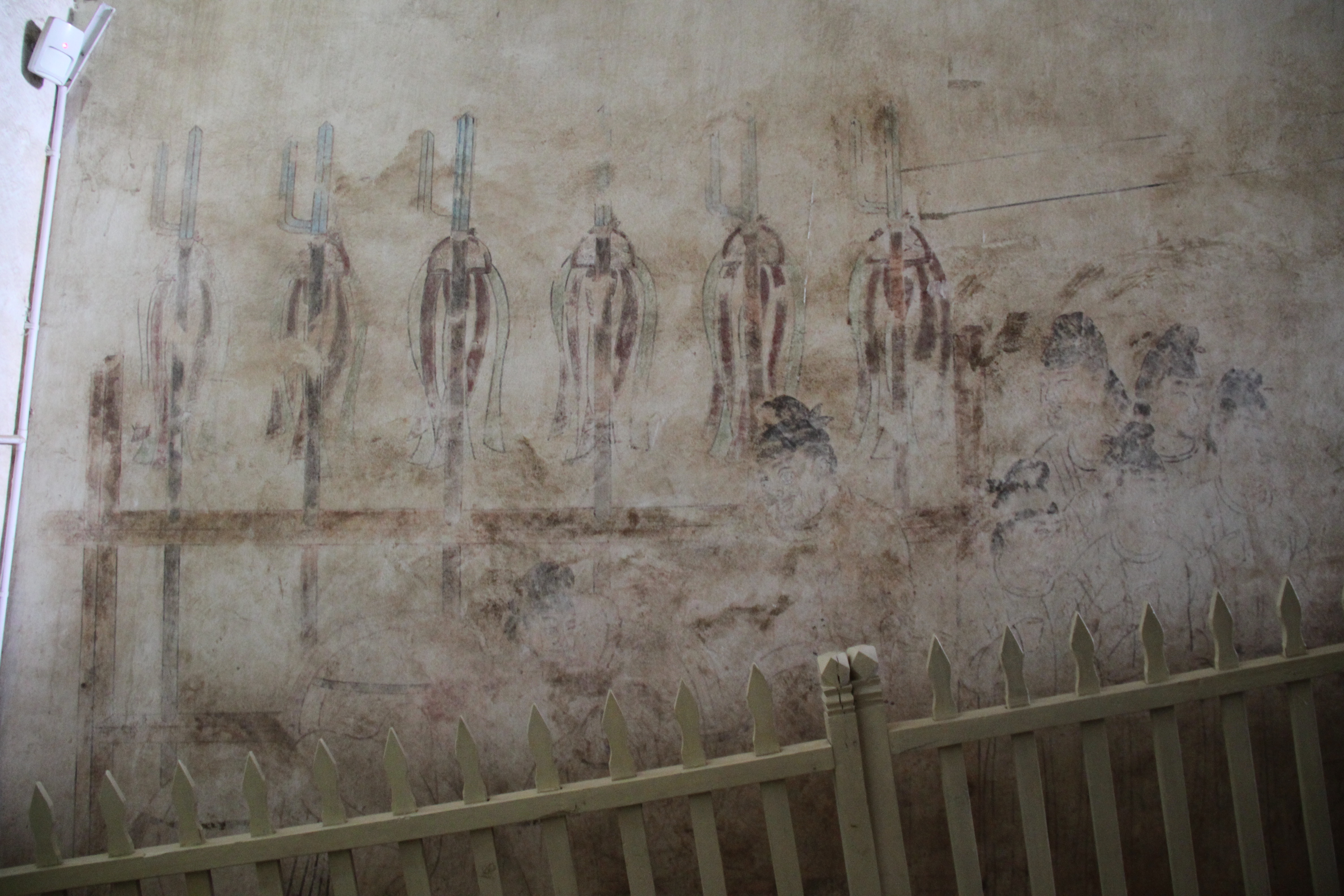
Ceremonial ji, Tang dynasty

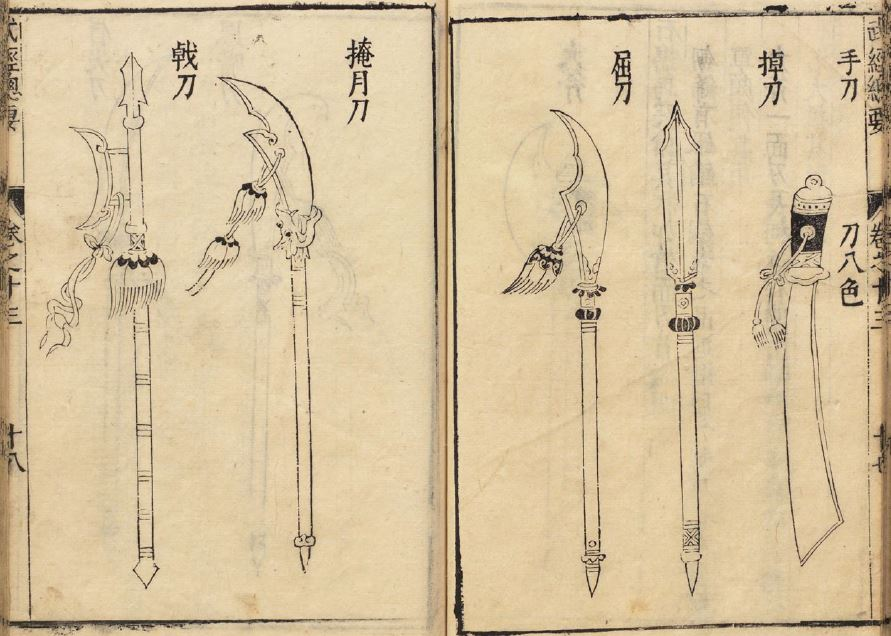
A ji dao on the left from the Wujing Zongyao

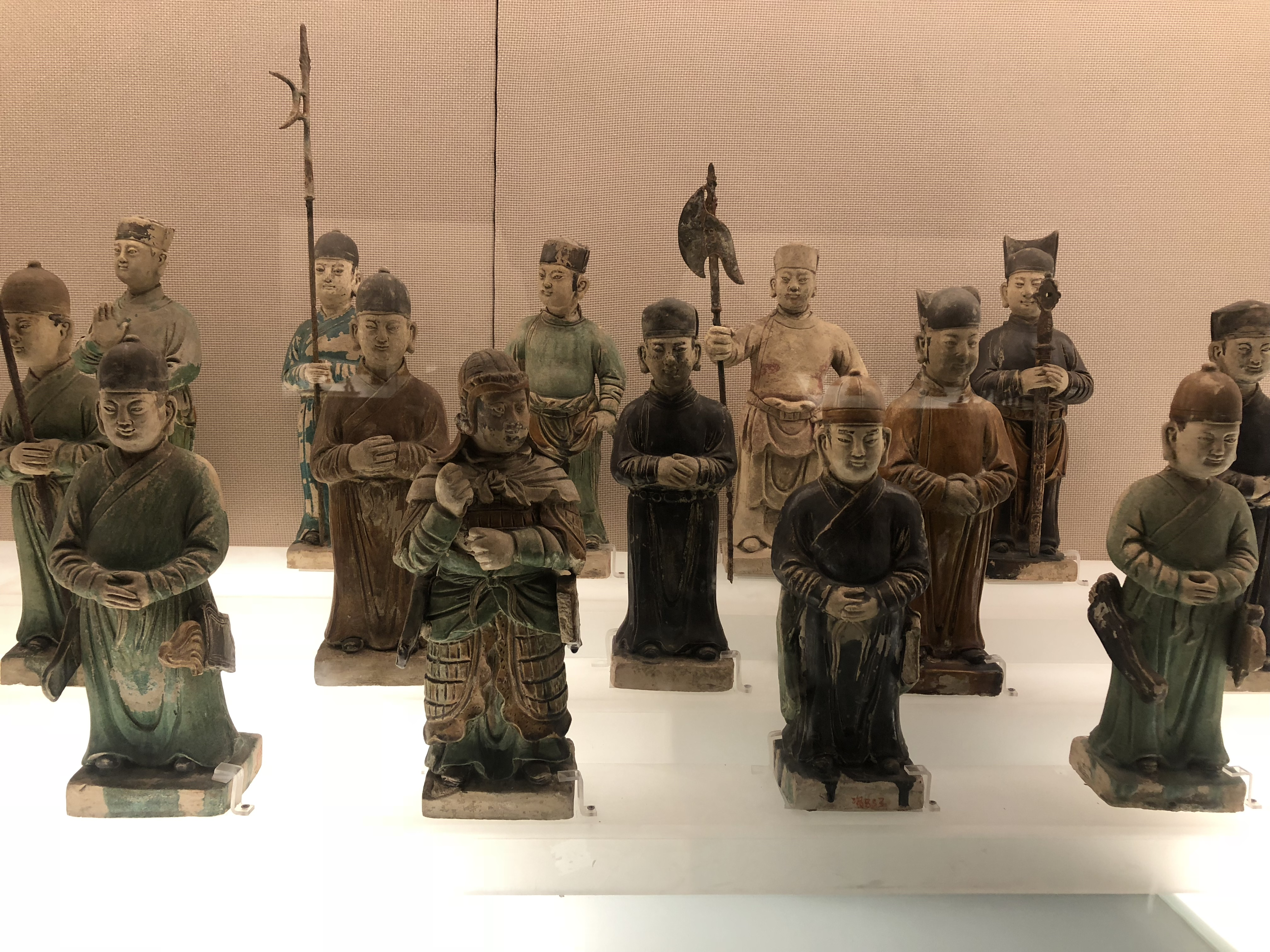
Tomb figurines of a soldier and two men holding an axe and ji polearm, Ming dynasty

Four ji (right), alongside two dagger-axes.

== See also ==
- Kama-yari
- Lucerne hammer
- Poleaxe

== Bibliography ==
- Lorge, Peter A. (2011), Chinese Martial Arts: From Antiquity to the Twenty-First Century, Cambridge: Cambridge University Press, ISBN 978-0-521-87881-4
