= Conqueror's Blade =

2019 video game

- Developer: Booming Tech
- Publishers: My.com; Mail.ru
- Engine: CHAOS
- Platform: Microsoft Windows
- Release: June 24, 2019
- Genres: Real-time tactics, MMO
- Modes: Single-player, multiplayer

Conqueror's Blade is a free-to-play, massively multiplayer online real-time tactics game developed by Chinese studio Booming Games, published by Mail.ru in Russia, by My.com in Europe and North America and by Booming Games in South America, MENA (Middle East and North Africa), Asia and Pacific. It is set in an open world inspired by medieval and feudal civilizations, and centers around siege combat, commanding units in real-time, and seizing territory from other players in online battles.

== Gameplay ==
Conqueror's Blade features turn-based strategy, and real-time tactics gameplay in online battles, similar to the Total War or Command & Conquer series. Players can directly take control of a warlord, who will issue orders to regiments that follow them into battle.

=== Units and classes ===
Players select a warlord from 14 available fighting classes, each with their own weapon specialization, and can customize the gender and appearance. Available weapons include the longsword (and shield), short sword (and shield), glaive, poleaxe, musket, nodachi, spear, dual blades, shortbow, longbow, pike, maul, chain dart and scimitar, and the newest addition, Shield & spear. The warlord can be controlled directly in combat via third-person view and can be used to issue commands to different units on the battlefield and during sieges. In the game, you can find units like winged hussars, tercio arquebusiers, cataphract lancers, and other units from different Eastern and Western civilizations. As of 2024, there are well over 100 different troop units available in the game.

=== Types of battles ===
There are 5 types of matched battles: standard battles, territory wars, expeditions, events and ranked battles.

In standard battles, you can find training camp (AI) and field battles where players need to capture flags and defeat enemies to reduce the enemy's points and siege battles where attackers must capture the final flag to win, and defenders must hold at least one flag at timeout. Territory wars are available twice per week. During the territory war, houses may declare war on non-neutral fiefs at a cost of their prestige. After declaring war, house members can go to the targeted fief(s) and join the battle. Expeditions are PvE battles where a team of five players team up against formidable enemies for great rewards. Event battles are made up of free battles and a death match.

In all of these battles (excluding death match), warlords can direct units to attack, follow, or take formation on the battlefield.

=== Houses ===
Players can also form houses with other players. This guild-like system allows players to form alliances to share resources and rewards, and team up to participate in larger battles and territory wars.

== Development ==
Conqueror's Blade has been in development since 2013. It was originally known as War Rage and was renamed Conqueror's Blade when it was first revealed to the public at E3 2017.

Conqueror's Blade is the first game developed by Booming Games, a Chinese development studio based in Hangzhou, China. Several employees, including CEO Xi Wang, previously worked on the Halo and Destiny series at Bungie. Conqueror's Blade is also the first game to use the CHAOS engine, which was developed in-house at Booming Games.

The NetEase Thunderfire UX team has been involved in the early development process of Conqueror's Blade, providing research support for the design team and artists at different stages of development.

=== Business model ===
Conqueror's Blade is free-to-play but will allow players to pay for certain in-game content. Founder's Packs are currently available that grant access to beta tests, along with other in-game content and items.

== Release ==
On July 31, 2018, it was confirmed that My.com would publish the game in Europe and North America. Mail.ru will handle publishing duties in Russia. Several closed beta tests have been held for the game.

== Reception ==
Conqueror's Blade received positive previews during its pre-release phases. Rock Paper Shotgun said the game was "a hell of a spectacle", though it criticized some of the grinding and 'level-gating'. WCCFtech praised the game's tutorial and claimed the game was "easy and accessible" to new players. MMOBomb said that the siege battles were "fun as all heck."

Jeuxvideo.com gave praise to the promise of the siege battles, with GameStar similarly praising to the scale of battles, comparing the game to the Total War series, Mount & Blade, and World of Warcraft. Mein-mmo.de favorably compared the scale of the game and its cinematic moments to films like Kingdom of Heaven and The Lord of the Rings trilogy.
