= Dagger-axe =

Chinese polearm

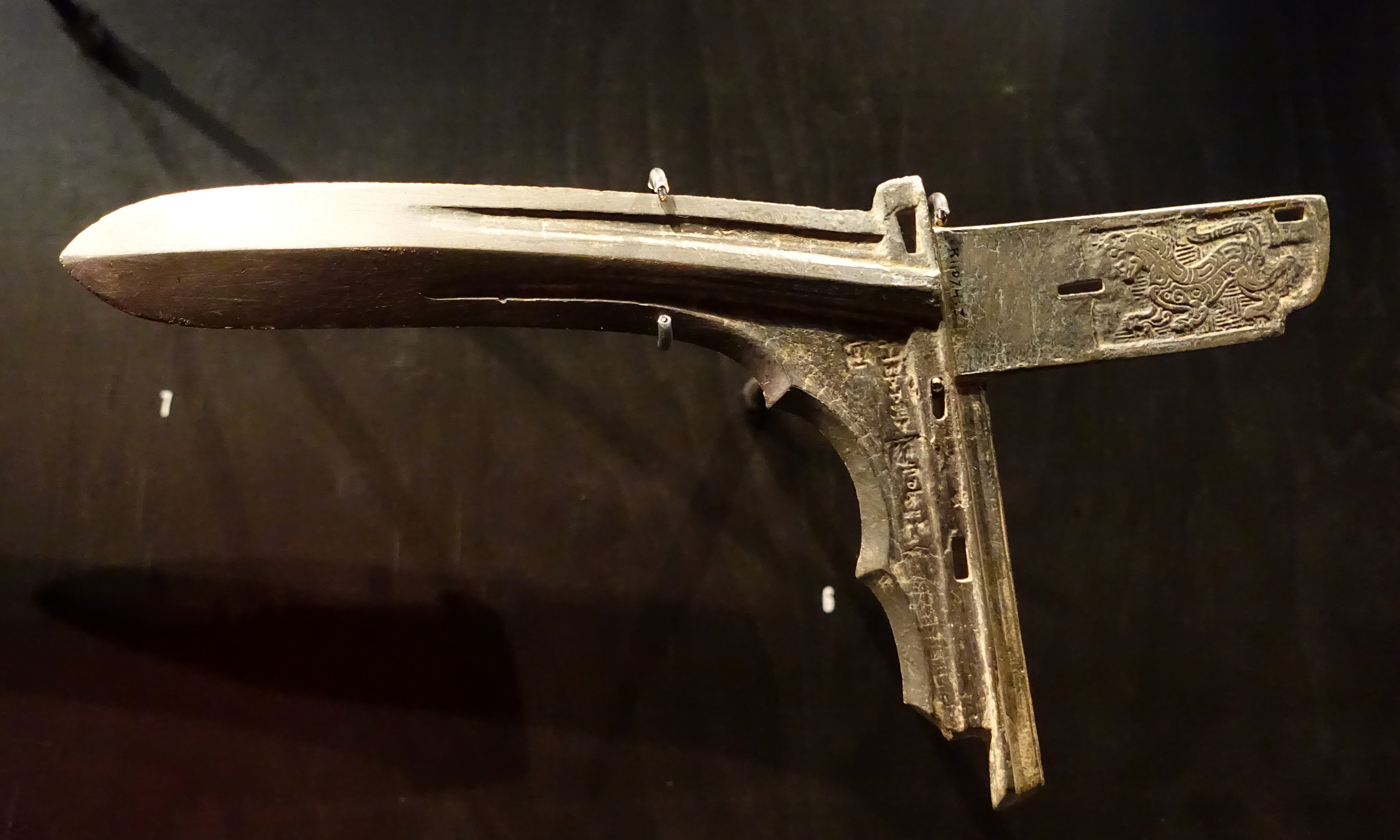
Gē with engraved decoration of a tiger, Warring States period (475–221 BC)

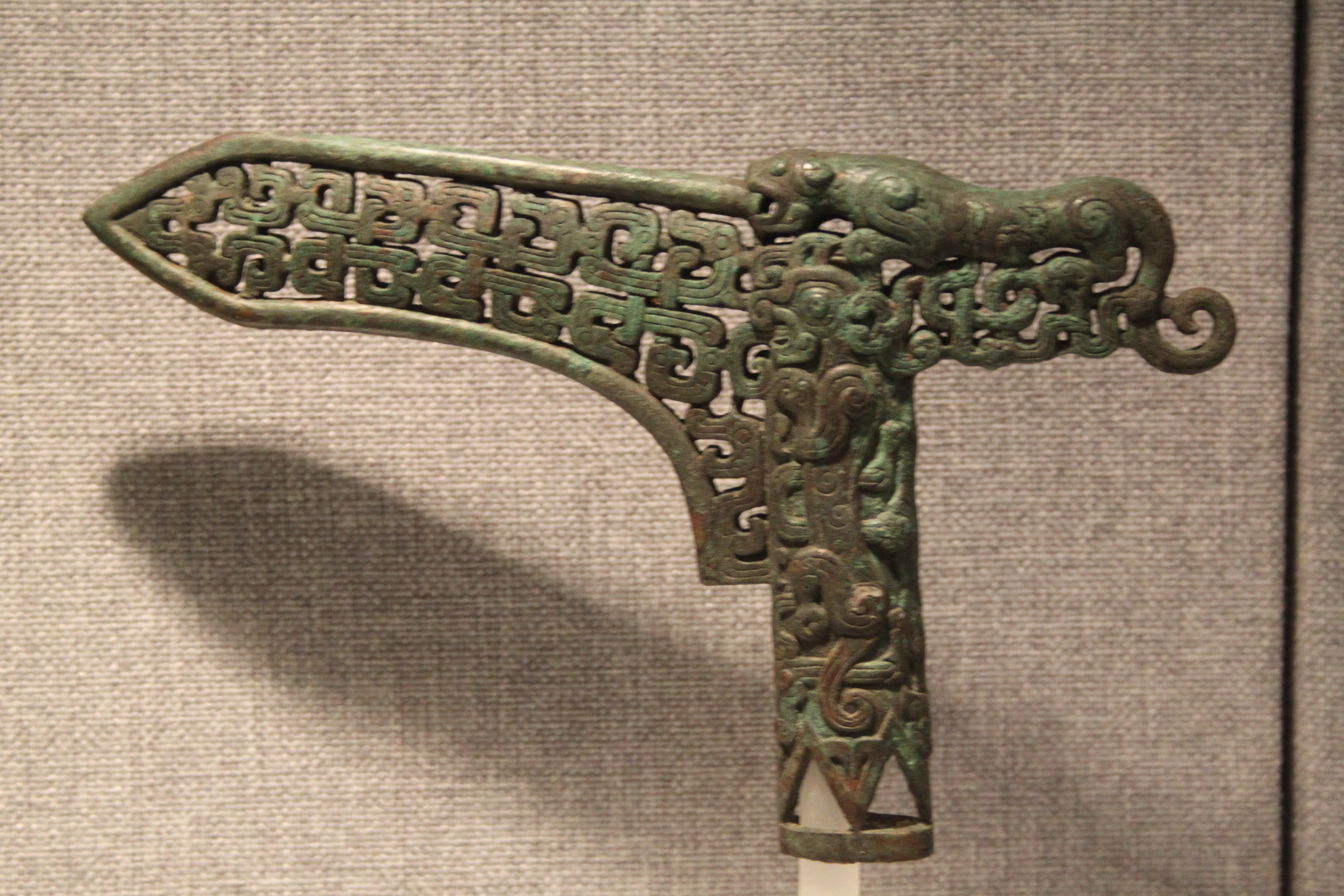
Eastern Zhou bronze dagger-axe

Two dagger-axes (left), alongside four jis

The dagger-axe (Chinese: 戈; pinyin: gē; Wade–Giles: ko) is a type of polearm that was in use from the Longshan culture until the Han dynasty in China. It consists of a dagger-shaped blade, mounted by its tang to a perpendicular wooden shaft. The earliest dagger-axe blades were made of stone. Later versions used bronze. Jade versions were also made for ceremonial use. There is a variant type with a divided two-part head, consisting of the usual straight blade and a scythe-like blade.

== History ==
The dagger-axe was the first weapon in Chinese history that was not also a dual-use tool for hunting (such as the bow and arrow) or agriculture. Lacking a point for thrusting, the dagger-axe was used in the open where there was enough room to swing its long shaft. Its appearance on the Chinese battlefield predated the use of chariots and the later dominance of tightly packed infantry formations.

During the Zhou dynasty, the ji or Chinese halberd gradually became more common on the battlefield. The ji was developed from the dagger-axe by adding a spear head to the top of the shaft, thereby enabling the weapon to be used with a thrusting motion as well as a swinging motion. Later versions of the ji, starting in the Spring and Autumn period, combined the dagger-axe blade and spear head into a single piece.

By the Han dynasty, the more versatile ji had completely replaced the dagger-axe as a standard infantry weapon. The ji was later replaced by the spear as the primary polearm of the Chinese military. By the Warring States period, large masses of infantry fighting in close ranks using the spear or ji had displaced the small groups of aristocrats on foot or mounted in chariots who had previously dominated the battlefield.

== Gallery ==
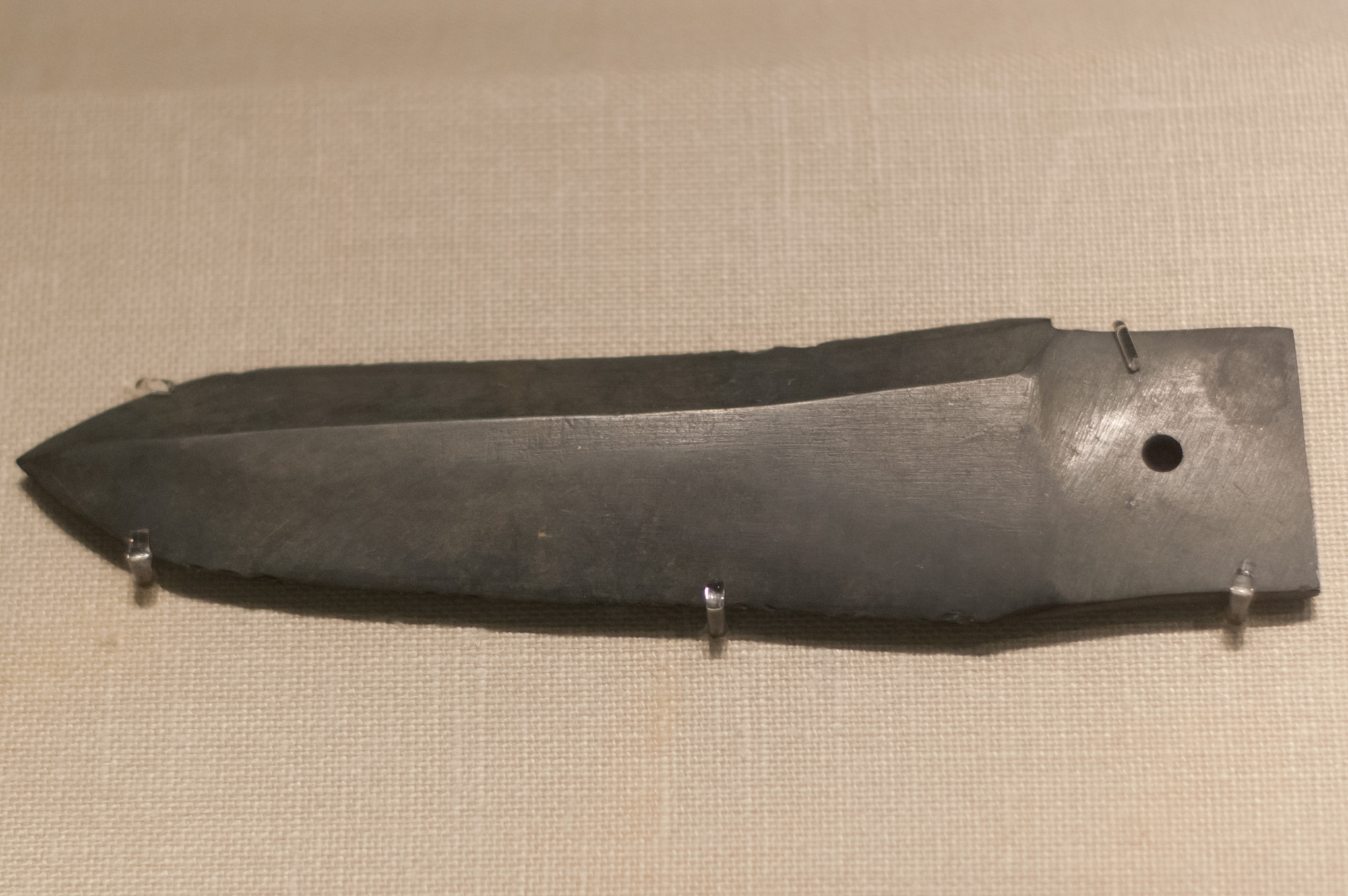
Stone dagger-axe head excavated in Hong Kong

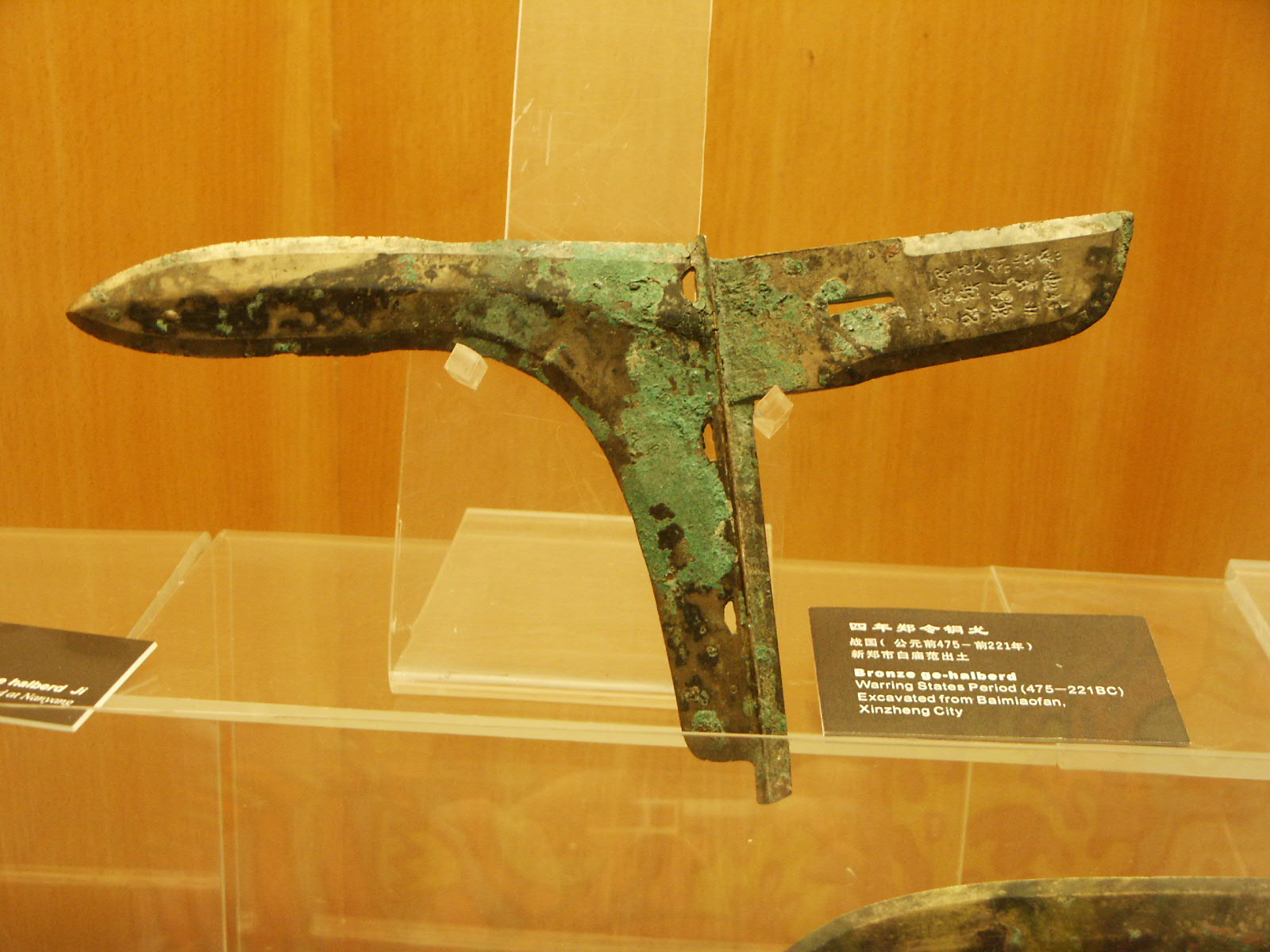
Dagger-axe (ge), Warring States

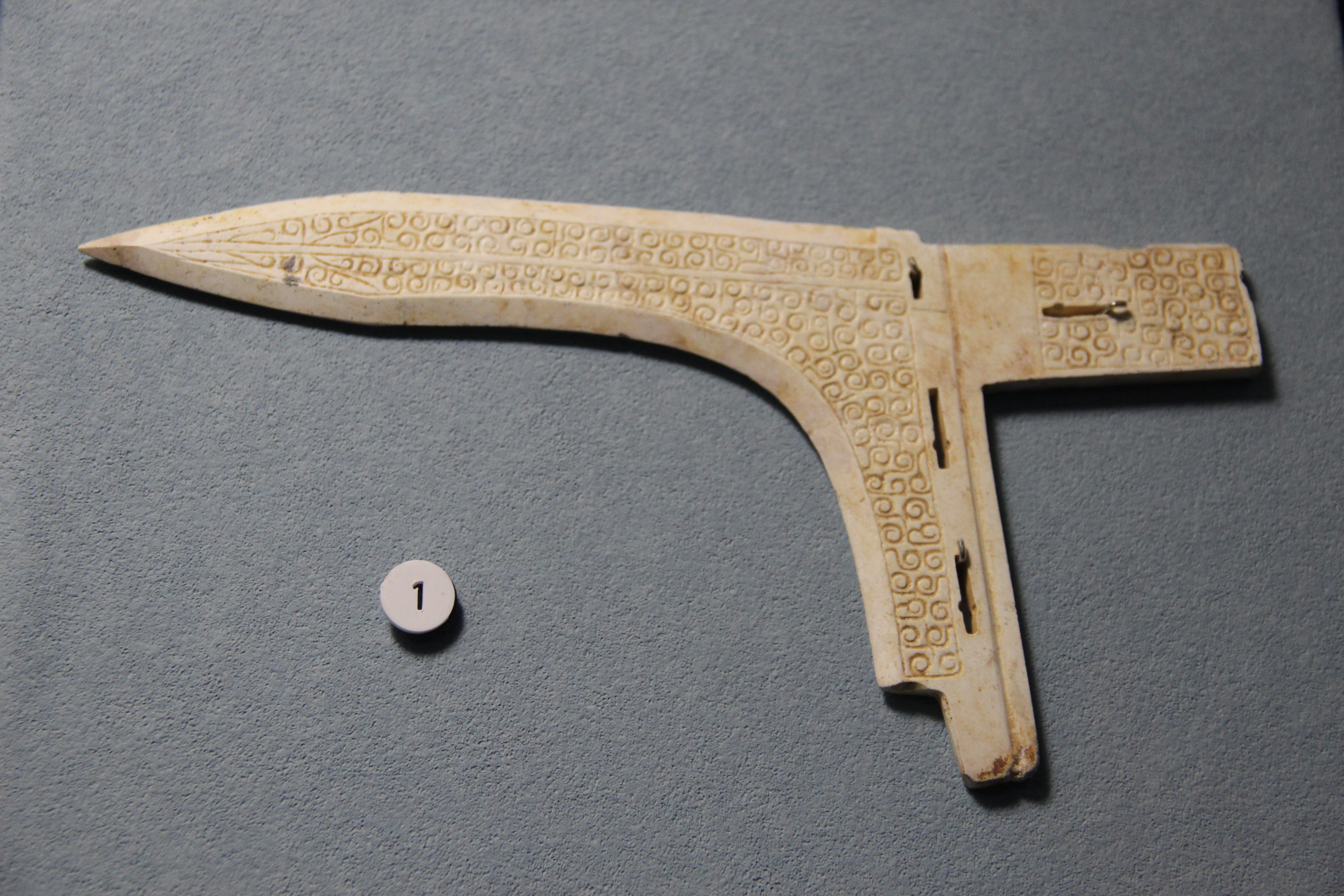
Jade dagger axe, Warring States

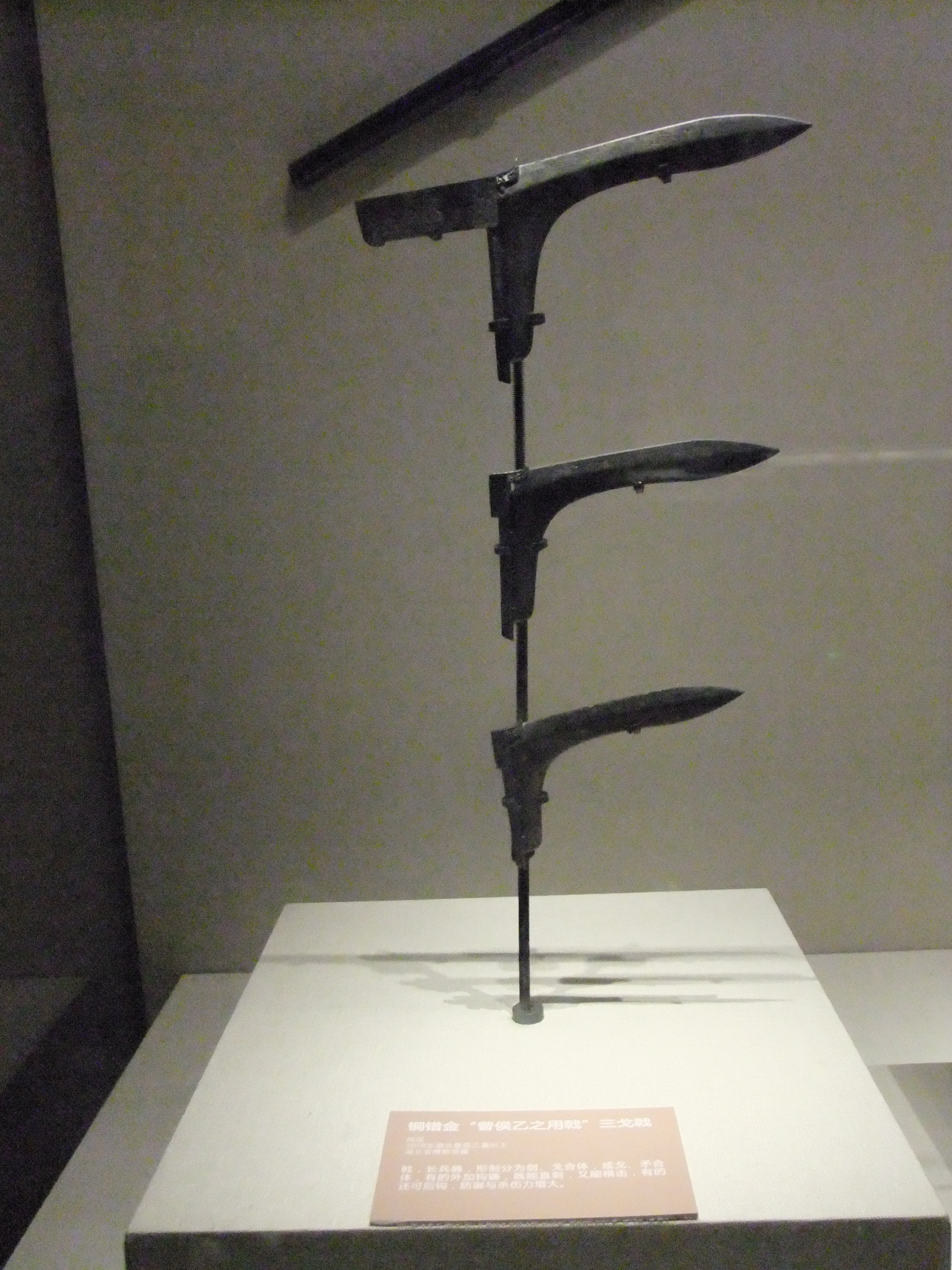
Triple dagger-axe, Warring States

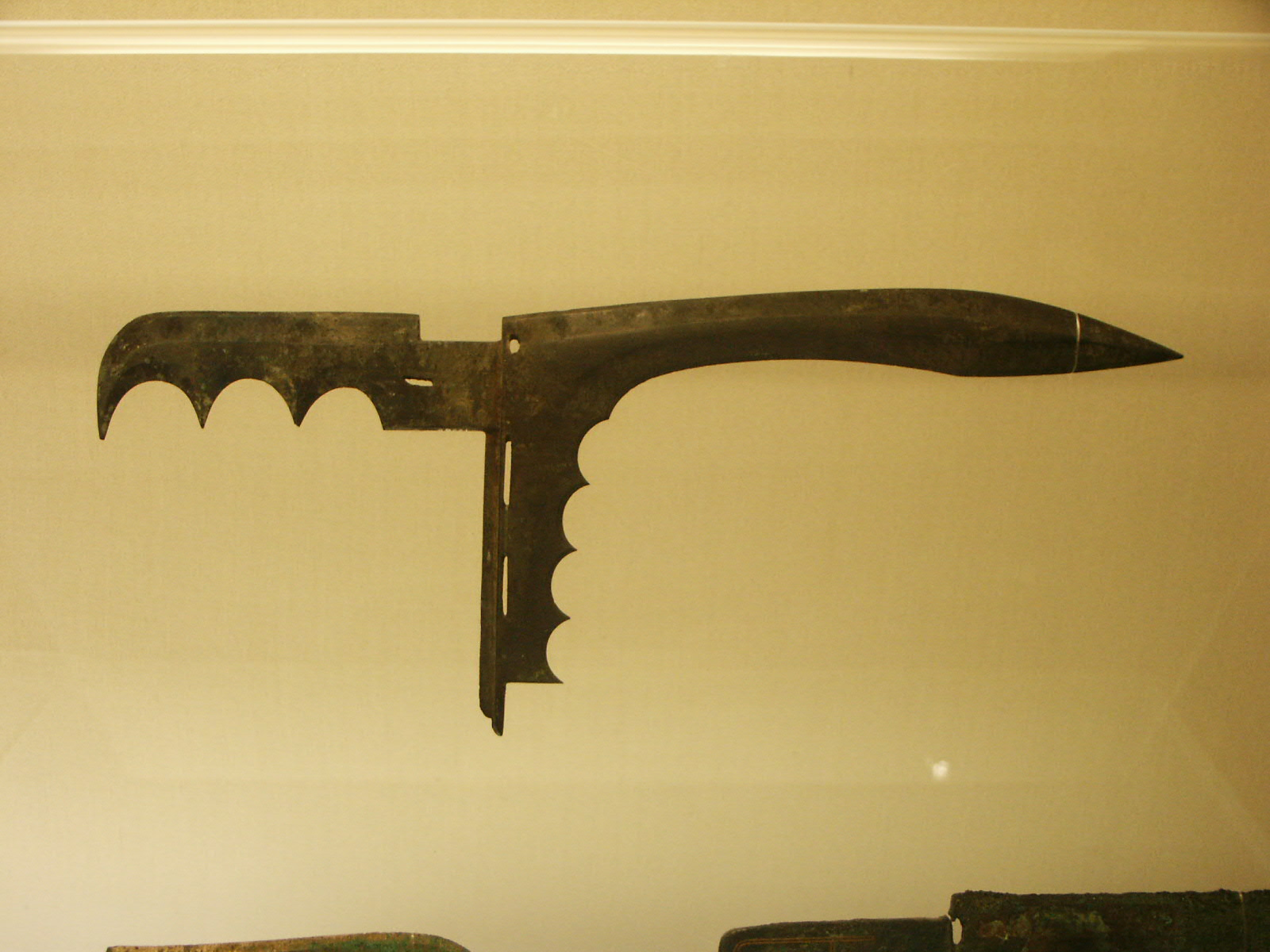
Scythed dagger-axe, Warring States

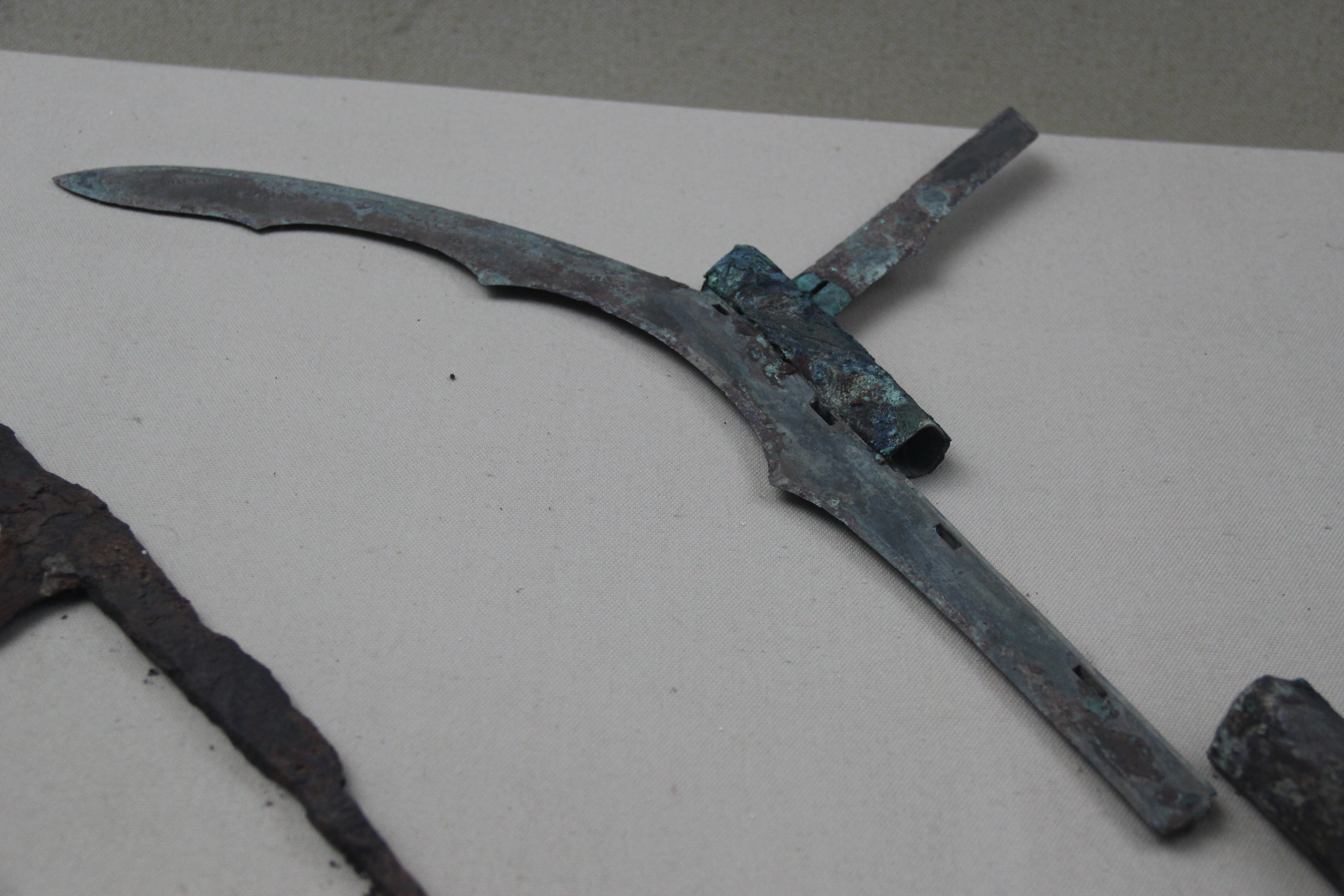
Han dynasty dagger-axe

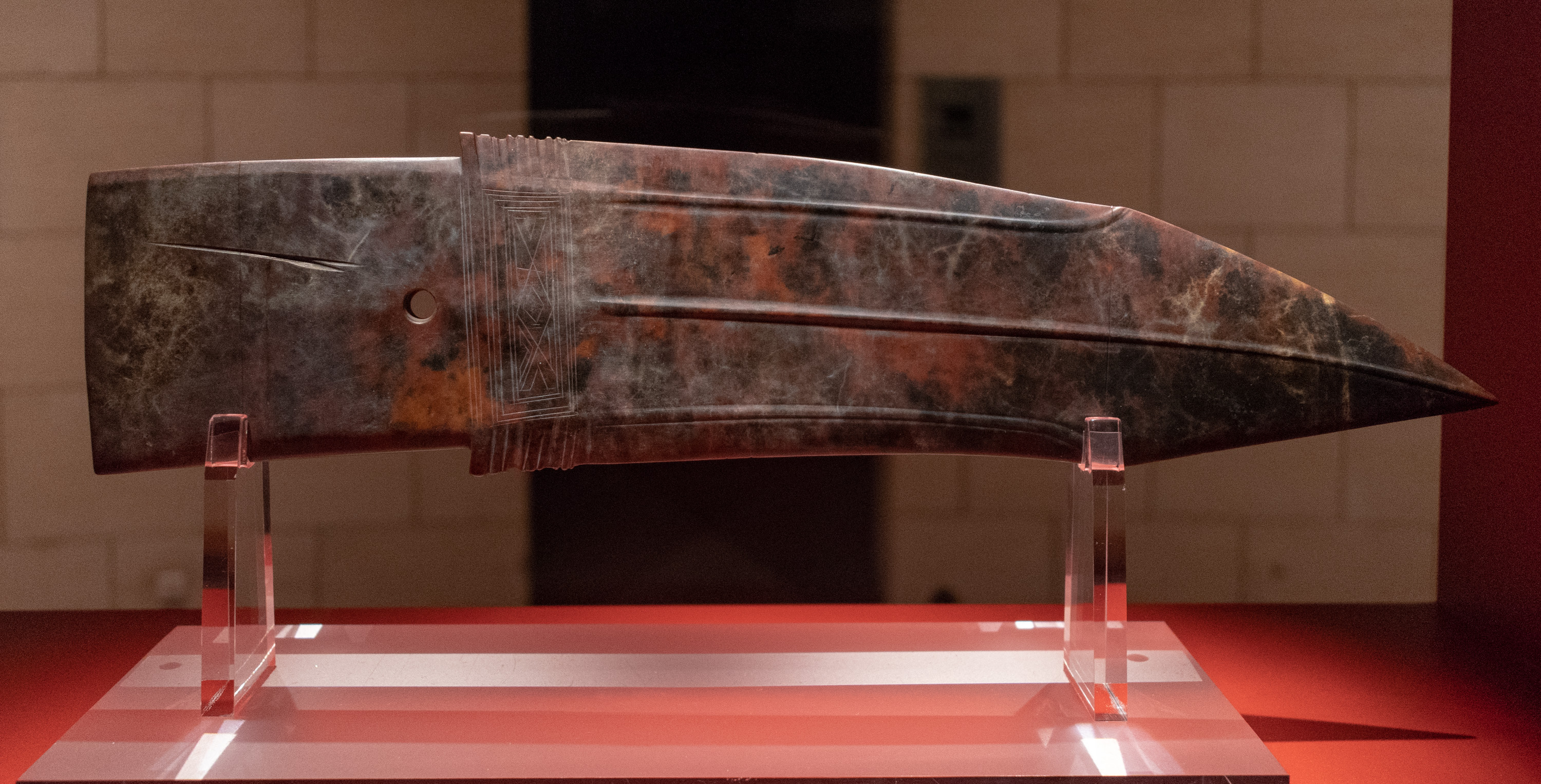
Jinsha Jade Dagger-axe

== See also ==
- Bec de corbin
- Bill (weapon)

== Bibliography ==
- Lorge, Peter A. (2011), Chinese Martial Arts: From Antiquity to the Twenty-First Century, Cambridge: Cambridge University Press, ISBN 978-0-521-87881-4
