= War hammer =

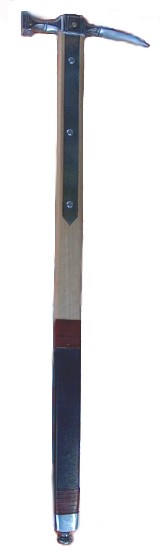
- War hammer
- Type: polearm or impact weapon
- Place of origin: Europe and the Middle East

Service history
- In service: Medieval

Specifications
- Head type: Hammer, sometimes an additional spike
- Haft type: One- or two-handed

A war hammer (French: martel-de-fer, "iron hammer") is a weapon that was used by both foot soldiers and cavalry. It is a very old weapon and gave its name, owing to its constant use, to Judah Maccabee, a 2nd-century BC Jewish rebel, and to Charles Martel, one of the rulers of France. In the 15th and 16th centuries, the war hammer became an elaborately decorated and handsome weapon.

The war hammer was a popular weapon in the late medieval period. It became somewhat of a necessity in combat when armor became so strong that swords and axes were no longer able to pierce them and ricocheted upon impact. The war hammer could inflict significant damage on the enemy through their heavy impact without the need to pierce the armor.

== Design ==
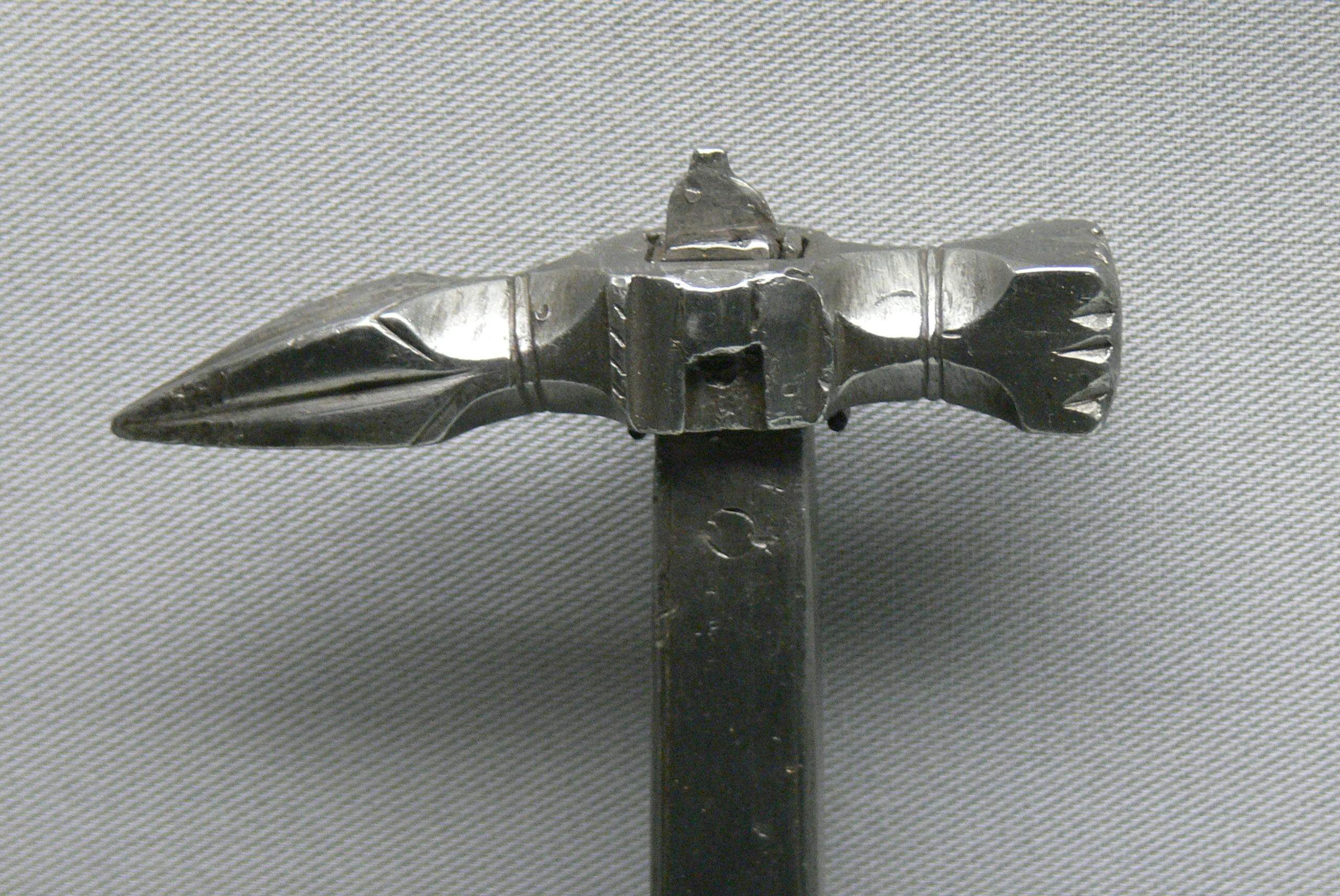
Detail of the head of a war hammer

A war hammer consists of a handle and a head. The length of the handle may vary, the longest being roughly equivalent to that of a halberd (five to six feet or 1.5 to 1.8 meters), and the shortest about the same as that of a mace (two to three feet or 60 to 90 centimeters). Long war hammers were polearms meant for use by foot soldiers, whereas shorter ones were primarily used by those mounted.

War hammers, especially when mounted on a pole, could in some cases transmit their impact through helmets and cause concussions. Later war hammers often had a spike on one side of the head, making them more versatile weapons.

The back spike could be used for hooking a target's armor, reins, or shield. The blunt side of a war hammer was usually used first to knock down and stun an enemy and, once the opponent were immobilized on the ground, the hammer is rotated to hit the target with the pointed side, which can punch a hole through the helmet and deliver the coup de grâce. A powerful swing from a war hammer (especially with the spike) can deliver a strike force of several hundred kilograms per square millimeter – this is the same penetrating force as a rifle bullet.

== Maul ==
A maul is a long-handled hammer with a heavy head, of wood, lead, iron, or steel. It is similar in appearance and function to a modern sledgehammer; it is sometimes shown as having a spear-like spike on the fore-end of the shaft.

The use of the maul as a weapon seems to date from the later 14th century. During the Harelle of 1382, rebellious citizens of Paris seized 3,000 mauls (French: maillet) from the city armory, leading to the rebels' being dubbed Maillotins. Later in the same year, Froissart records French men-at-arms using mauls at the Battle of Roosebeke, demonstrating that they were not simply weapons of the lower classes.

A particular use of the maul was by archers in the 15th and 16th centuries. At the Battle of Agincourt, English longbowmen are recorded as using lead mauls, initially as a tool to drive in stakes but later as improvised weapons. Other references during the century (for example, in Charles the Bold's 1472 Ordinance) suggest continued use. They are recorded as a weapon of Tudor archers as late as 1562.

== History ==
Full-fledged warhammers emerged in the mid-14th century as a direct response to the growing prevalence and effectiveness of plate armor on European battlefields. By 1395, French infantry deployed sophisticated warhammers equipped with thrusting tips, side flanges, and a basic beak, known as "Picoise." These initially single-handed warhammers would later evolve into longer two-handed pole hammers, becoming not only widespread on European battlefields but also prominent in duels, particularly those involving armored combatants in tournaments or judicial settings.

In the context of duels, the pole hammer was often categorized as a subtype of the pole-axe, commonly referred to as "axes" in period fencing manuals (German: (Mord)Axt, Italian: (Azza)). Pole hammers designed for duels frequently featured a rondel-shaped guard to protect the forward hand and a spike at the rear for increased versatility. Some variants also incorporated additional hooks at the rear to facilitate binding enemy weapons and limbs. While earlier pole hammers had flat surfaces, by the 15th century, there was a trend towards dividing the hammerhead into three or four diamond-shaped tips to avoid the head of the weapon from sliding on armor plate and to focus the impact onto a smaller area. According to Austrian army officer and weapons expert Wendelin Boeheim, these modifications were primarily driven by aesthetic considerations rather than functional improvements. In some instances, the hammer surface featured the monogram of its owner, enabling the identification of victims on the battlefield.

Starting from the 15th century, shorter warhammers found use as cavalry weapons. Initially rejected by the nobility due to their commoner origins, practicality eventually compelled their adoption. This perception would later shift, with cavalry commanders, known as Rottmeister (lit. packmaster), carrying warhammers both as weapons and symbols of rank. These hammers became known as "Rottmeister hammers" or "packmaster hammers." In landsknecht armies, a similar connotation existed, where hammers evolved into status symbols among the lower nobility in eastern parts of central Europe (Poland-Lithuania/Hungary), second only to sabers in prestige. According to Polish aristocrat Andrzej Kitowicz, a nobleman would not leave his house without his saber and his warhammer, which could also serve as a walking stick. Late Central European hammers can be categorized into three subtypes: the Czekan, a warhammer with a flattened square or hexagonal surface and a bearded axe blade on the back; the Nadziak, a classic warhammer with a flattened square or hexagonal surface and a beak at the back; and the Ogbur, similar to the Nadziak but with an S-shaped or strictly curved beak on the back. All these types shared the characteristic of having staffs made from hard wood, often extending over the socket, and lacking a thrusting tip.

While the warhammer fell out of favor in most parts of Europe, it remained popular in Poland and Hungary until the first half of the 18th century.

== Gallery ==
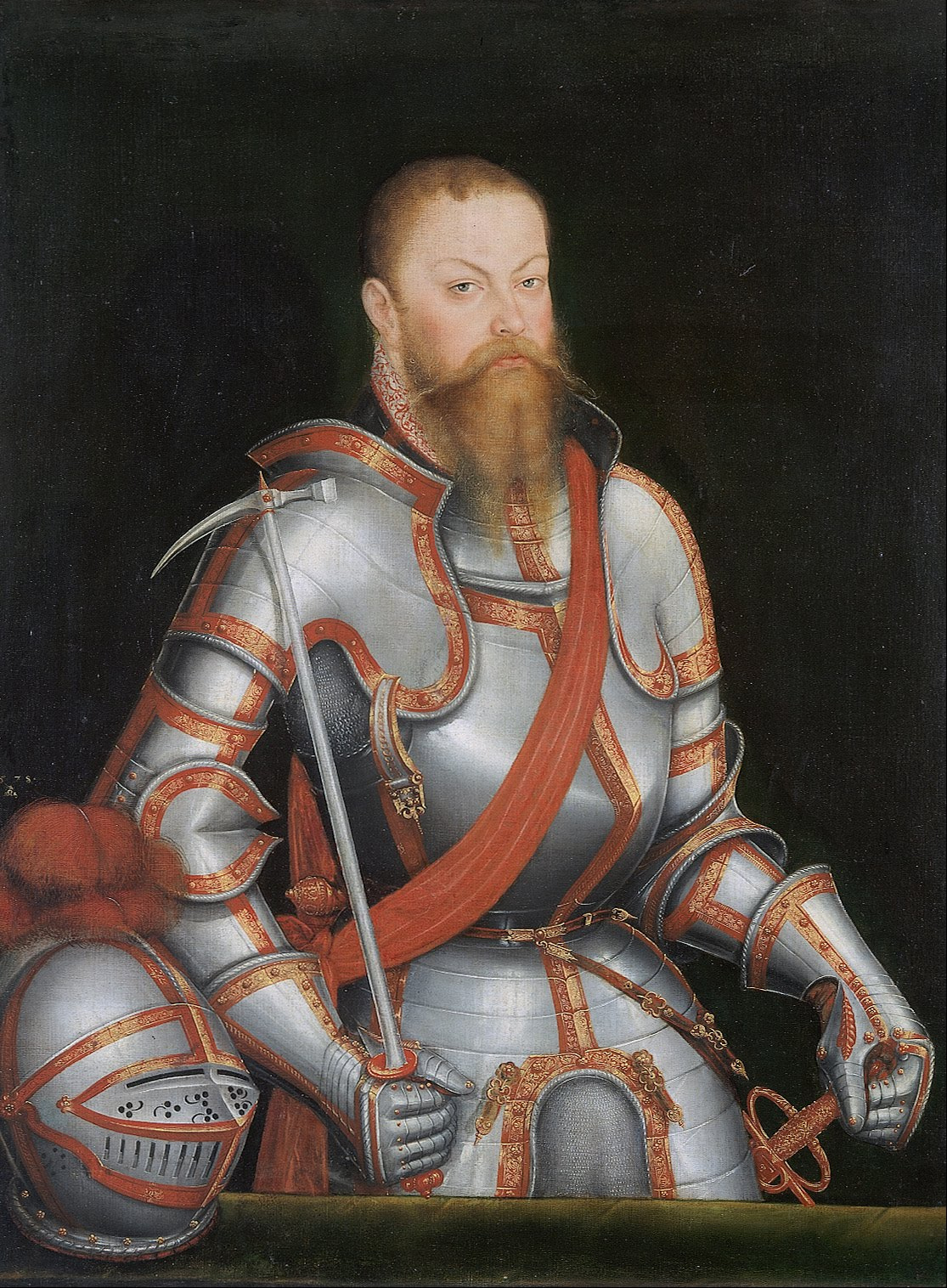
Maurice, Elector of Saxony wields a war hammer on a posthumous portrait

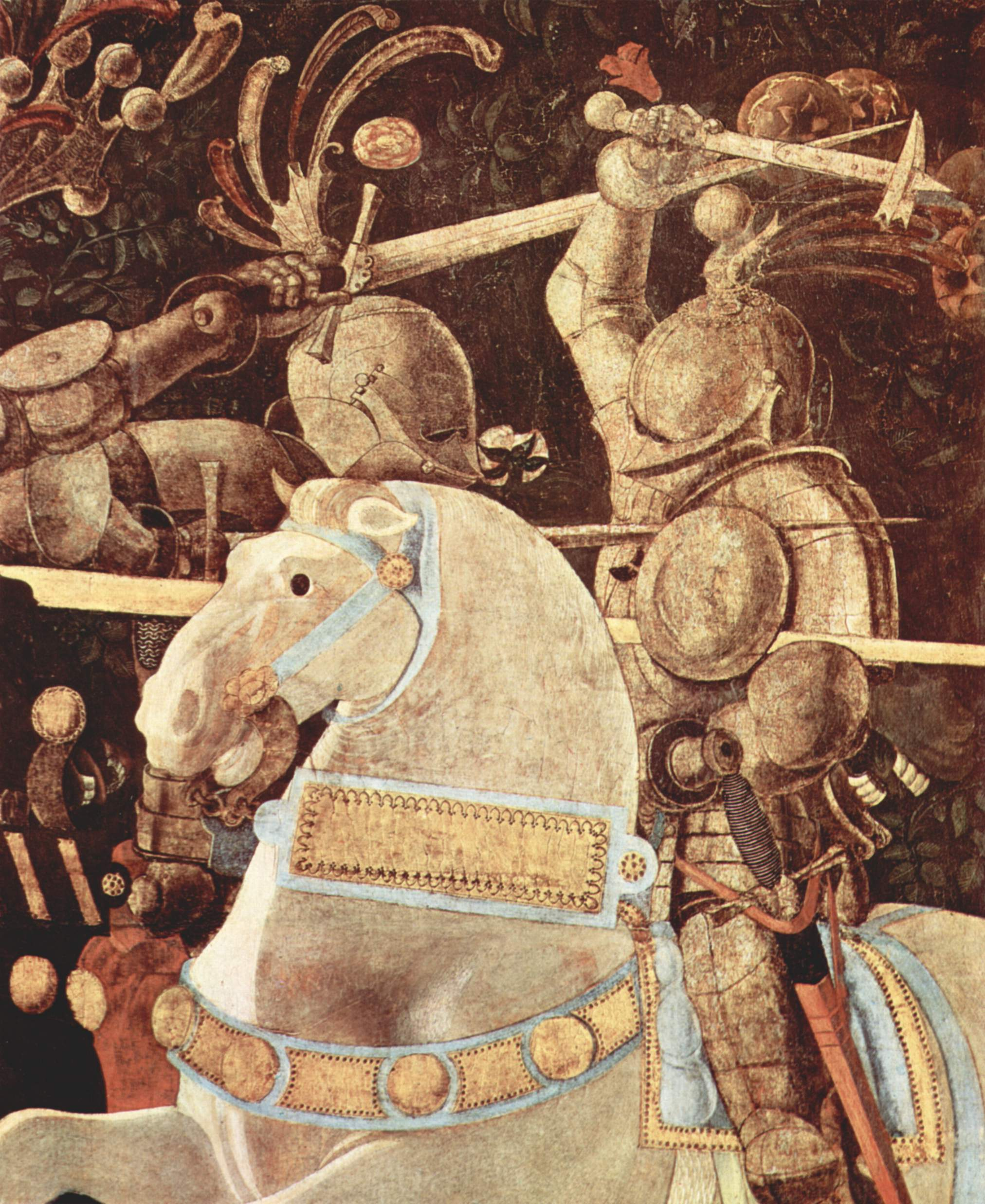
Knight with war hammer (painting by Paolo Uccello)

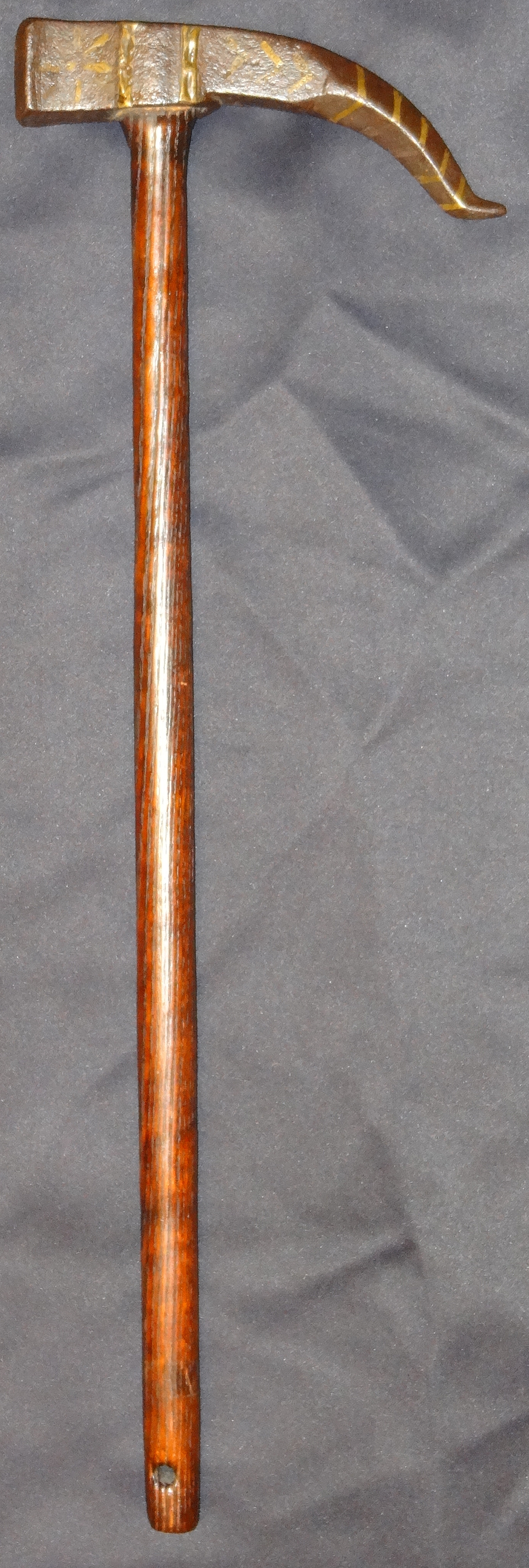
Indo-Persian war hammer, heavy iron head with a hammer in front, a 4.5-inch (11 cm) curved spike on the other side, cut channel decorations, hard wood shaft

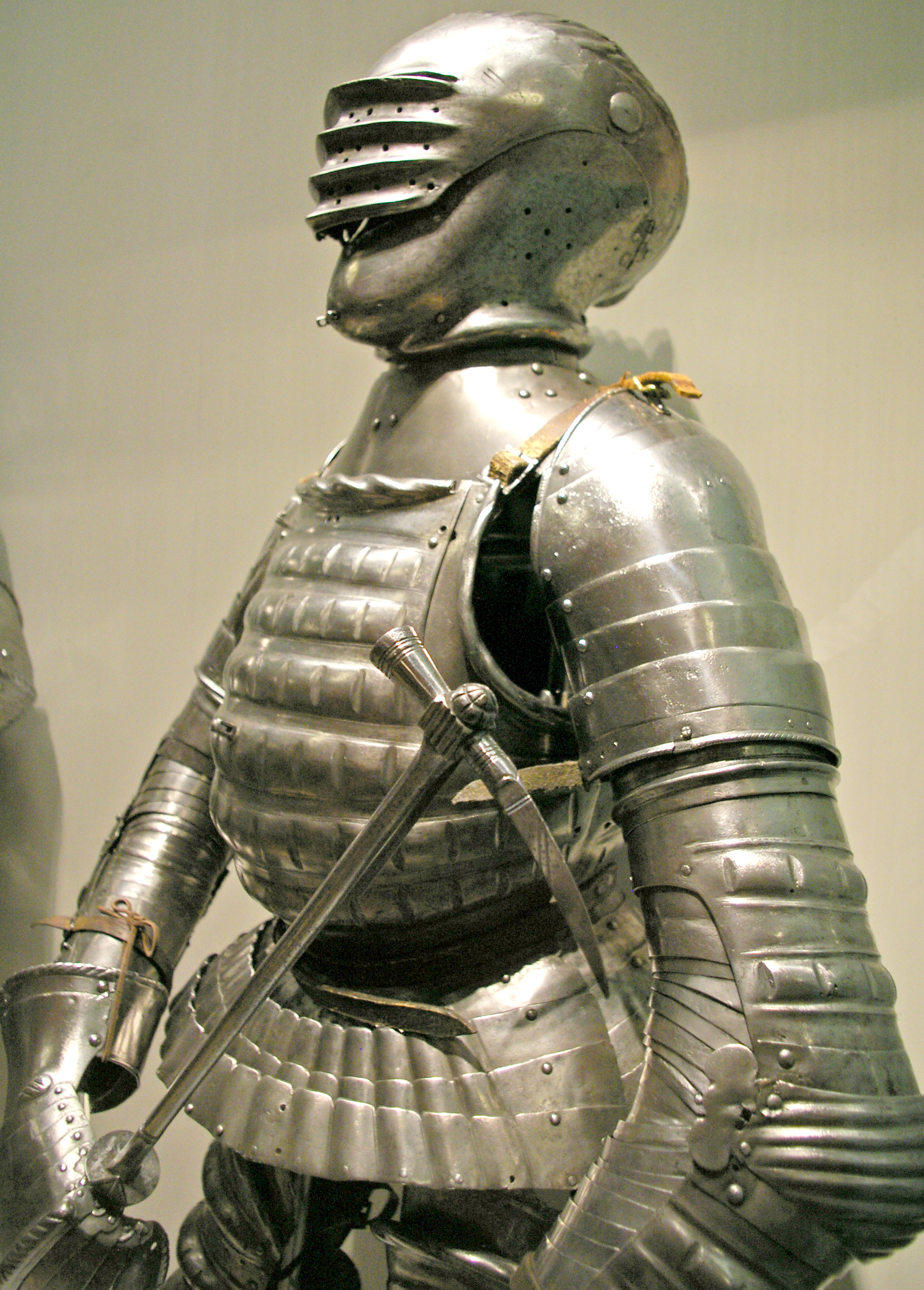
War hammer exhibited in the Deutsches Historisches Museum, Berlin

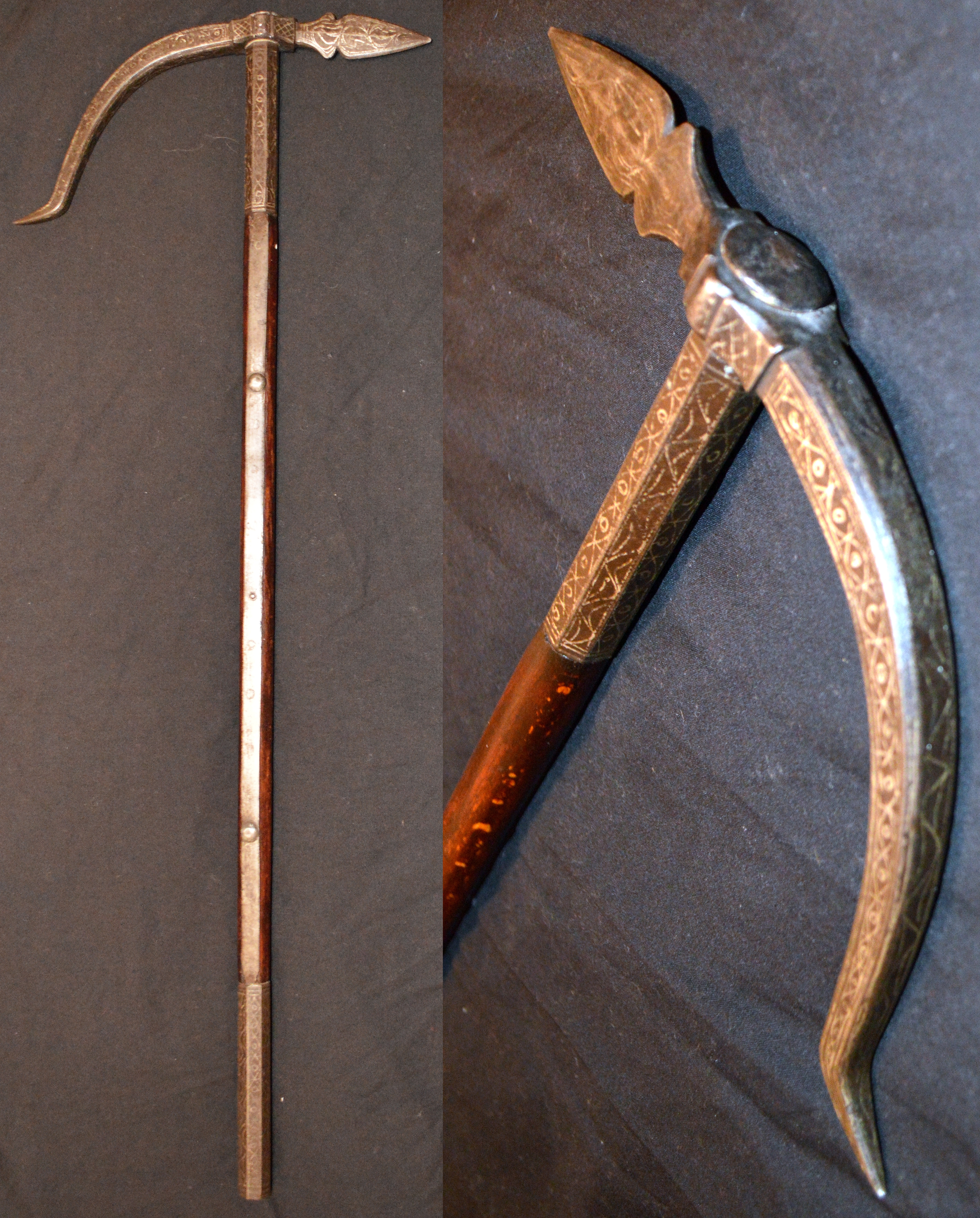
Indian war hammer, 19th century, hard wood shaft with full length metal strip for re-enforcement, silver koftgari decoration

== See also ==
- Bec de corbin
- Flail (weapon)
- Horseman's pick
- Kanabō
- Lucerne hammer
- Mace (bludgeon)
- Ōtsuchi
- Poleaxe
- Shepherd's axe
- Totokia
- Chuí (Chinese weapon)
