= Kama-yari =

Japanese pole weapon

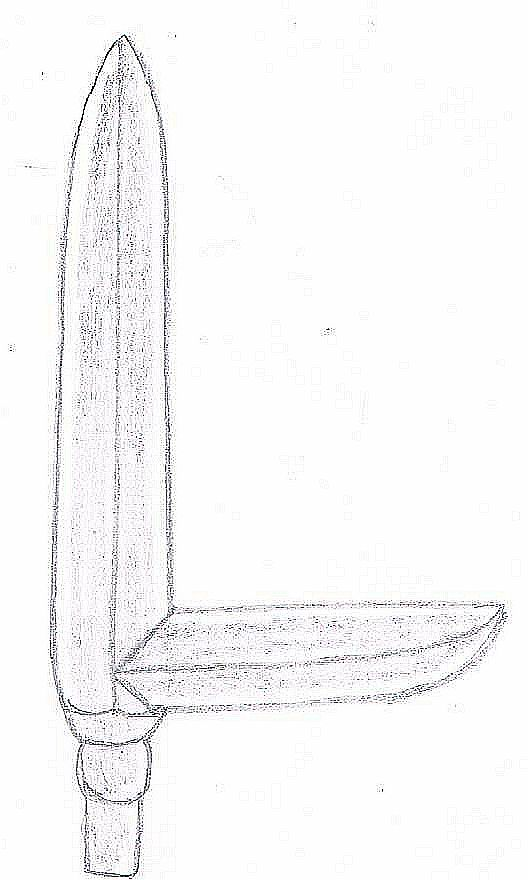
Kama-yari

The kama-yari (鎌槍, 'sickle spear') is essentially a yari with blade or blades at a right angle to the shaft. The cutting edge of these blades ranged between 6 and 8 inches long. There are many types. The two major categories are:

- Kata-Kamayari: Those with one horizontal blade protruding from one side; In some of them, there may be a very short blade on the other side.
- Jumonji Yari: Those with two horizontal blades protruding from two sides.

These blades could be turning towards to the tip of the yari, or away from it.

Larger and larger versions were called O-Kamayari

Generally, the transverse blade, or hook, is large enough to hold the head, neck, or jaw or to grapple with the limbs, or weapons of an opponent. It is different in function from other types of suyari. The kama-yari was often used to hook horsemen and dismount them.

The kama-yari is believed to have been developed by Kakuzenbo Hoin In’ei, who wanted to improve upon the naginata used by Buddhist priests at the time.

== See also ==
Ji (polearm)
