= Ōtsuchi =

Japanese war mallet

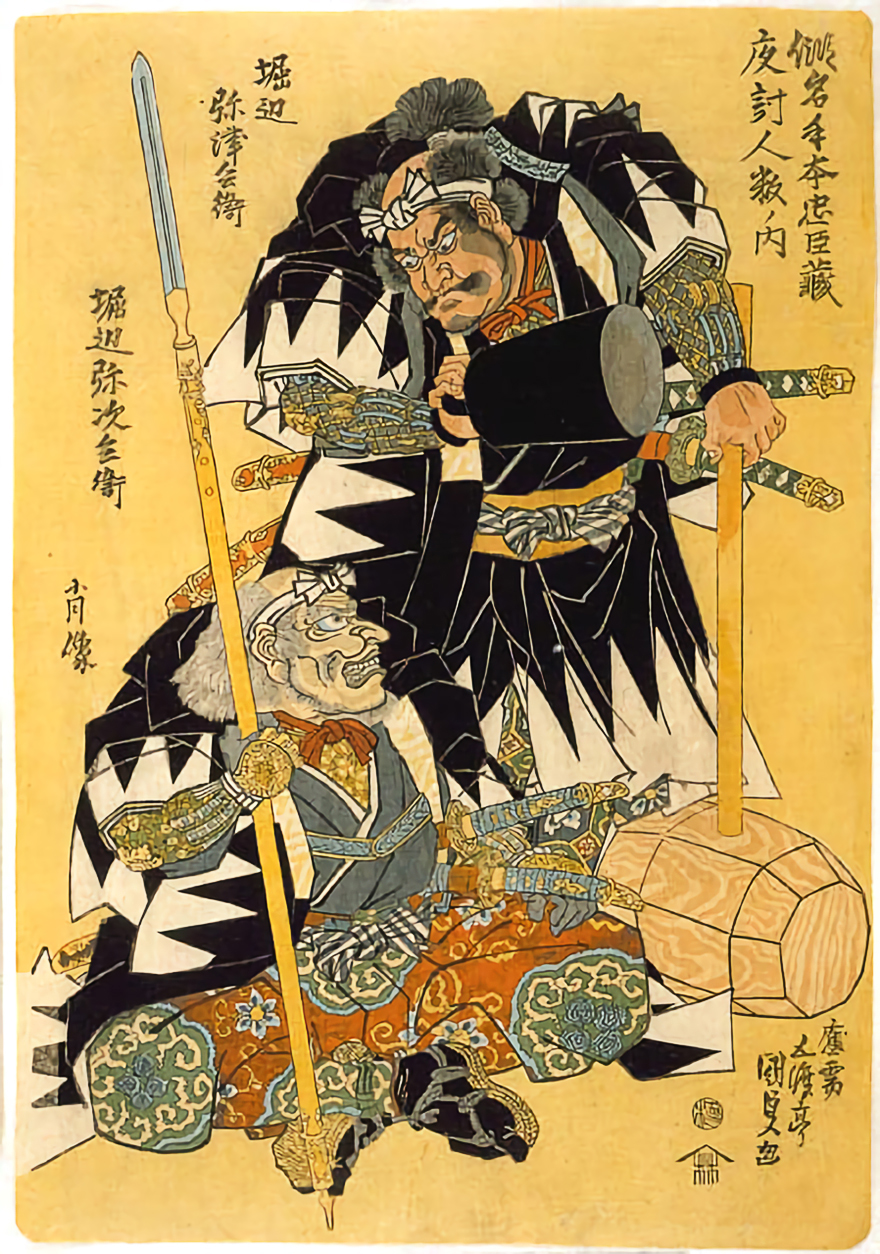
In this Kunisada print, Horibe Yasubei holds a large mallet.

An ōtsuchi (大槌, lit. large hammer or mallet) is a large wooden war mallet used by the samurai class of feudal Japan. Unlike bladed weapons such as the katana or polearms such as the naginata, the ōtsuchi was a blunt-force instrument, resembling an oversized wooden mallet or sledgehammer. It had a shaft of about 6 ft (183 cm) much like the ono (war axe). Typically constructed of heavy wood, sometimes reinforced with iron, the ōtsuchi was not commonly used for direct combat but for breaching doors, gates, or fortifications. Its design and purpose align it with siege implements rather than battlefield sidearms, yet it occupies a place in the corpus of Japanese martial weaponry.

== Historical context ==
During the Heian period (794–1185), most warfare in Japan emphasized mounted archery and swords. However, as castles and fortified structures developed during the Kamakura (1185–1333) and Muromachi periods (1336–1573), siege warfare became increasingly important. The ōtsuchi emerged in this context as a practical tool for breaking gates, doors, and barricades. Its blunt force could shatter wooden barriers that would resist bladed or piercing weapons.

Though not as iconic as swords or spears, the ōtsuchi held tactical significance. Samurai and ashigaru (foot soldiers) carrying the mallet typically accompanied assault units in castle sieges, where speed in breaching an entryway could determine victory or defeat.

== Design and construction ==
The ōtsuchi generally measured around six feet (1.8 meters) in length, comparable to a long staff weapon. The head was a massive wooden block, cylindrical or rectangular in shape, secured to a wooden shaft. While many were entirely of hardwood, some extant examples and descriptions suggest reinforcement with iron bands to increase durability and impact power.

== Usage ==
=== Siege warfare ===
The primary function of the ōtsuchi was in siege warfare. Samurai chronicles occasionally mention the use of heavy hammers in castle assaults. A coordinated group could swing the mallet repeatedly against doors until they collapsed.

=== Ritual and symbolic use ===
Beyond combat, the ōtsuchi has symbolic resonance in Japanese folklore. The uchide no kozuchi (打ち出の小槌), or "magic mallet," appears in tales such as that of the Issun-bōshi, where a miniature hero wields a mallet granting wishes.

=== Martial arts training ===
While no classical koryū (old martial arts schools) treat the ōtsuchi as a primary battlefield weapon, training with heavy wooden implements was sometimes used to develop strength. Comparable to suburitō (heavy wooden swords), the mallet served as conditioning equipment.

== Cultural significance ==
Although not as romanticized as the katana, the ōtsuchi embodies the practical aspect of Japanese warfare. Its presence in siege contexts emphasizes the importance of combined arms: swordsmen, archers, engineers, and breachers working in tandem.

== Comparison with similar weapons ==
The ōtsuchi is sometimes compared to the kanabō, a spiked or studded club also used by samurai. While both are blunt-force weapons, the kanabō was designed for direct combat, whereas the ōtsuchi functioned primarily as a breaching tool.

== Modern depictions ==
In modern popular culture, the ōtsuchi is occasionally reimagined:

- In manga and anime, large hammers are often wielded by female characters for comedic effect, inspired by the exaggerated size of the traditional mallet.
