= Lucerne hammer =

Early modern Swiss combination polearm

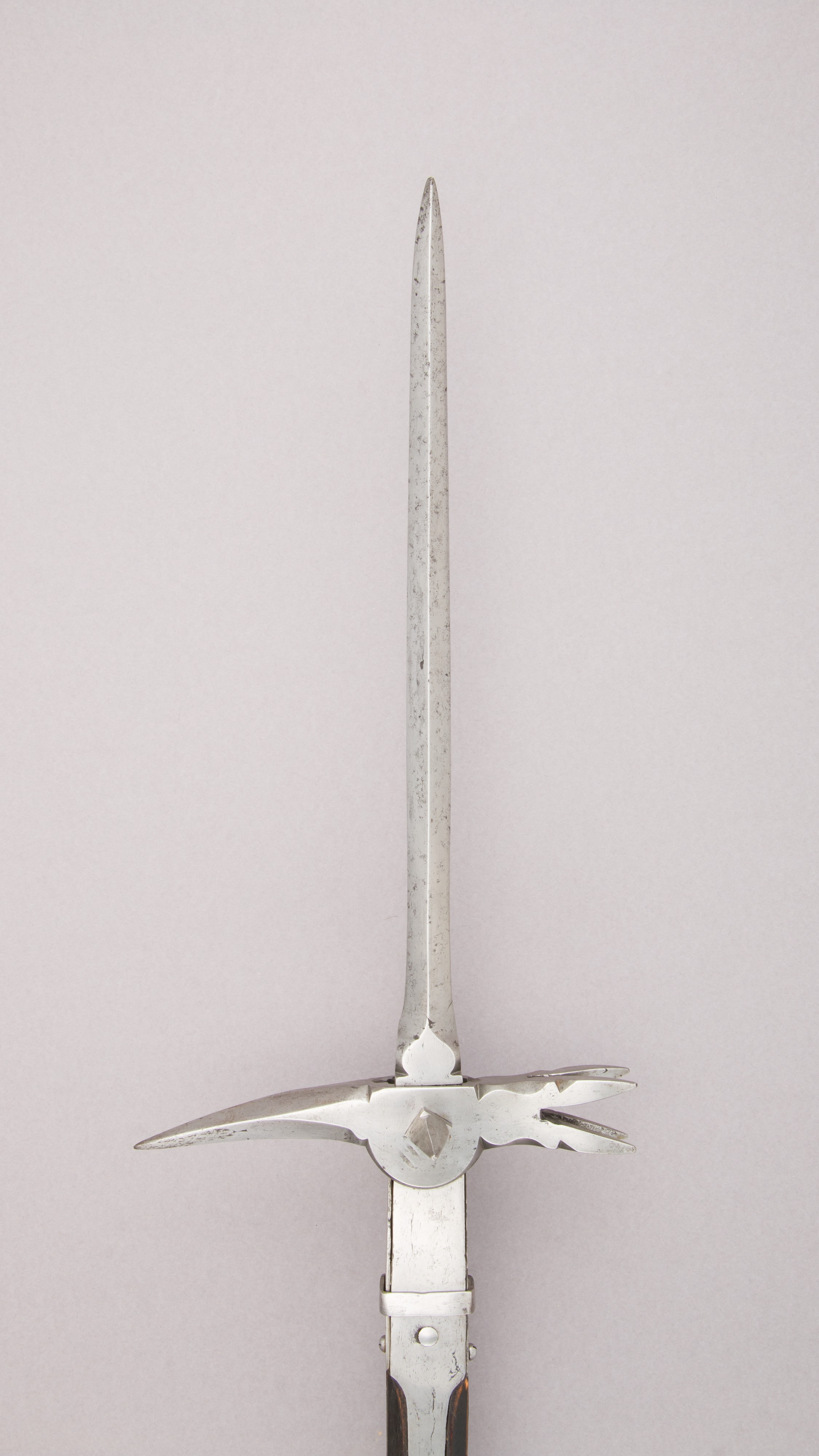
The head of a Swiss Lucerne hammer with four-pronged face, long rear beak and top spike c. 1520, Metropolitan Museum of Art

The Lucerne hammer (/luˈsɜːrn/ loo-SURN) is a polearm that combines a multi-pronged hammer, a long rear spike (bec or beak) and an even longer top spike. It was carried chiefly by the civic and cantonal forces of the Old Swiss Confederacy from the late 15th through the 17th centuries and takes its modern name from the large concentration of surviving examples found in the armoury of Lucerne.

== Origins and terminology ==
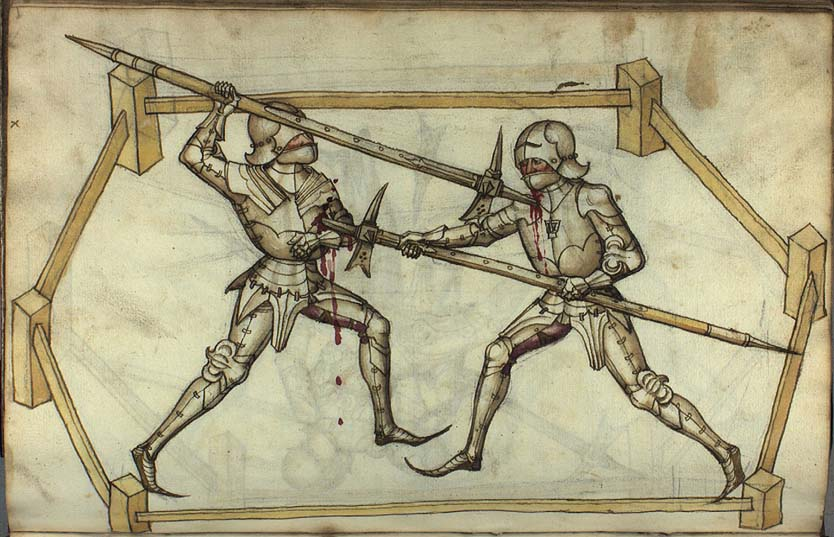
Polehammer-type poleaxes depicted in Hans Talhoffer's Alte Armatur und Ringkunst (Bavaria, 1459)

During the 14th century, Swiss infantry favoured the poleaxe or fussstreithammer, a polearm with a short spike and a three- or four-pronged hammer face. Toward the 1470s, smiths in central Switzerland lengthened the rear beak and split the hammer into four parallel prongs, creating the form now called the Lucerne hammer. It is consequently considered a later development of the bec de corbin by some scholars, though its classification and typology are the focus of debate.

Contemporary records simply call the weapon die Hamer or mordaxt in German, and la hache in French inventories; Lucerne hammer is a modern label that distinguished the four-pronged Swiss pattern from earlier poleaxes, having been coined by 19th-century arms collector J. Meyer-Bielmann in 1869. Although now often classed as a type of poleaxe, the Lucerne hammer lacks a bladed edge and in its place has a curved beak. It is mechanically akin to the earlier Italian martello d'arme (war hammer) and to the German fussstreithammer, combining blunt and percussive elements.

== Construction ==
Much like the bec de corbin, examples are about 1.5 m (4.9 ft) long overall. The steel head is fastened by two or four langets and side-lugs and made up of:

- Hammer face consisting of four spikes set in line with the shaft; early heads are massive for crushing plate armour, later 16th-century heads are lighter with longer, sharper prongs to improve penetration.
- Rear beak of a stout, slightly down-curved form, capable of piercing mail and plate.
- Dague, or top spike, that was lengthened across the 16th century until on parade pieces it rivals a pike head, mirroring trends in the halberd.

Several armouries stamped an "L" or a cantonal coat of arms on the domed collar beneath the hammer. Nidwalden and Bern kept sizeable stocks, but surviving numbers are small compared to Swiss halberds.

== Fighting use ==
The weapon was wielded two-handed. Manuals such as Le Jeu de la Hache (c. 1400) and Hans Talhoffer's Fechtbuch (1467) treat the long-shafted hammer and poleaxe as premier knightly arms for foot combat, emphasising:

- Thrusts with the top spike against gaps in plate armour.
- Hooking with the rear beak to drag mounted men from the saddle.
- Blunt trauma with the hammer to buckle plates or break mail.

Swiss civic guards continued to carry Lucerne hammers on watch, at executions, and in escort duty into the 17th century, long after the weapon had left the battlefield.

== In modern culture ==
Within the historical European martial arts community, the Lucerne hammer is treated as the armoured-combat poleaxe taught in Le Jeu de la Hache: practitioners drill thrusts with the long spike, percussive strikes with the four-pronged head and hooking pulls with the rear beak. Because of the weapon’s mass and injury risk, most schools confine work to technical sequences in full armour; free sparring is rare. Training relies on specialised simulators: rubber-headed polehammers predominate for safety, while wooden or blunted-steel versions are chosen when authentic weight and balance are required. The poleaxe set is now a standard element of advanced HEMA curricula and features regularly at European and North American events.

Depictions of the Lucerne hammer (usually under the in-game name polehammer) feature in a number of medieval combat video games. The weapon was added in the December 2013 content update for Chivalry: Medieval Warfare, and was reintroduced in its 2021 sequel Chivalry 2. Other games that include the weapon are Kingdom Come: Deliverance (2018) and Mordhau (2019).

== See also ==
- Swiss arms and armour – Military equipment of the Old Swiss Confederacy
