= Bec de corbin =

Medieval pole weapon

Illustration of a bec de corbin

A bec de corbin (Modern French: Bec de corbeau, [bɛk də kɔʁ.bo]) is a type of polearm and war hammer that was popular in late medieval Europe. The name is Old French for "raven's beak". Similar to the Lucerne hammer, it consists of a modified hammer's head and spike mounted atop a long pole. Unlike the Lucerne hammer, the bec de corbin was used primarily with the "beak" or fluke to attack instead of the hammer head. The hammer face balancing the beak was often blunt instead of the multi-pronged Lucerne, and the beak tended to be stouter; better designed for tearing into plate armor, mail, or gambeson. Nonetheless, some becs-de-corbin also had a multi-pronged hammer. The spike mounted on the top of the head was also not nearly as long and thin as on the Lucerne. Bec de corbin is sometimes used as a general term to describe several types of war hammer, such as mauls and horseman's picks. A similar name, bec de faucon (meaning "falcon's beak"), refers to a related weapon. The difference between a bec de faucon and bec de corbin is subjective, depending on whether they look more like the beak of a raven or falcon.
