= Ox tongue spear =

Type of pole weapon

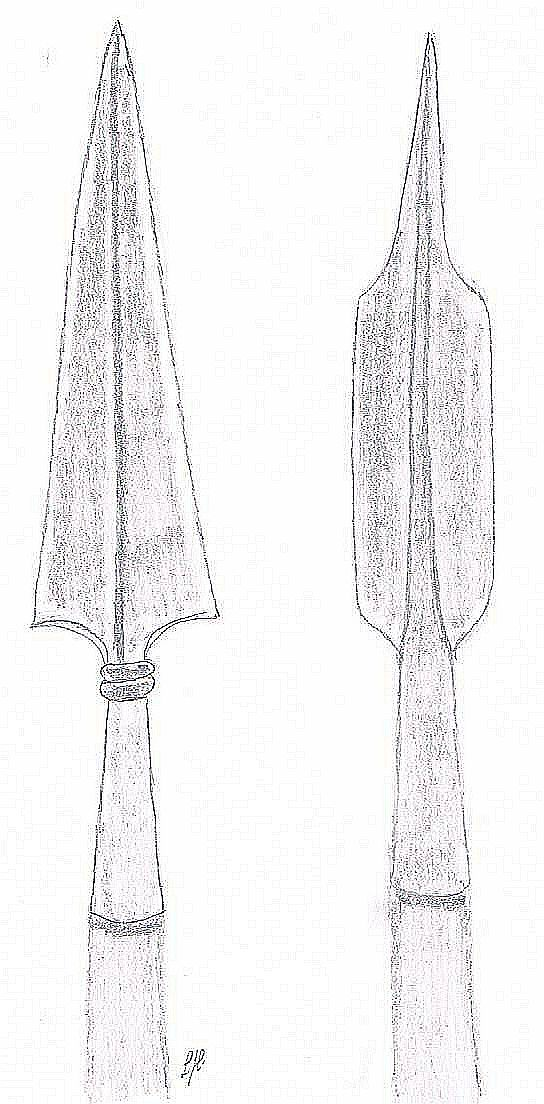
Ox tongues

The ox tongue (French: langue de boeuf or langdebeve; German: Ochsenzunge or Stecheisen) was a type of broad-headed double-edged spear that was used in Europe during the 15th and 16th centuries. Some designs had protrusions from the middle or base of the blades, making the head similar in profile to a partisan. Primarily, it was large and heavy, used by infantry in skirmishing.

== See also ==
- Glaive
- Hǫggspjót
- Partisan (weapon)
- Rogátina (Russian: рога́тина)
- Sovnya (Russian: совня)
- Spontoon
- Swordstaff
