= Partisan (weapon) =

Type of polearm

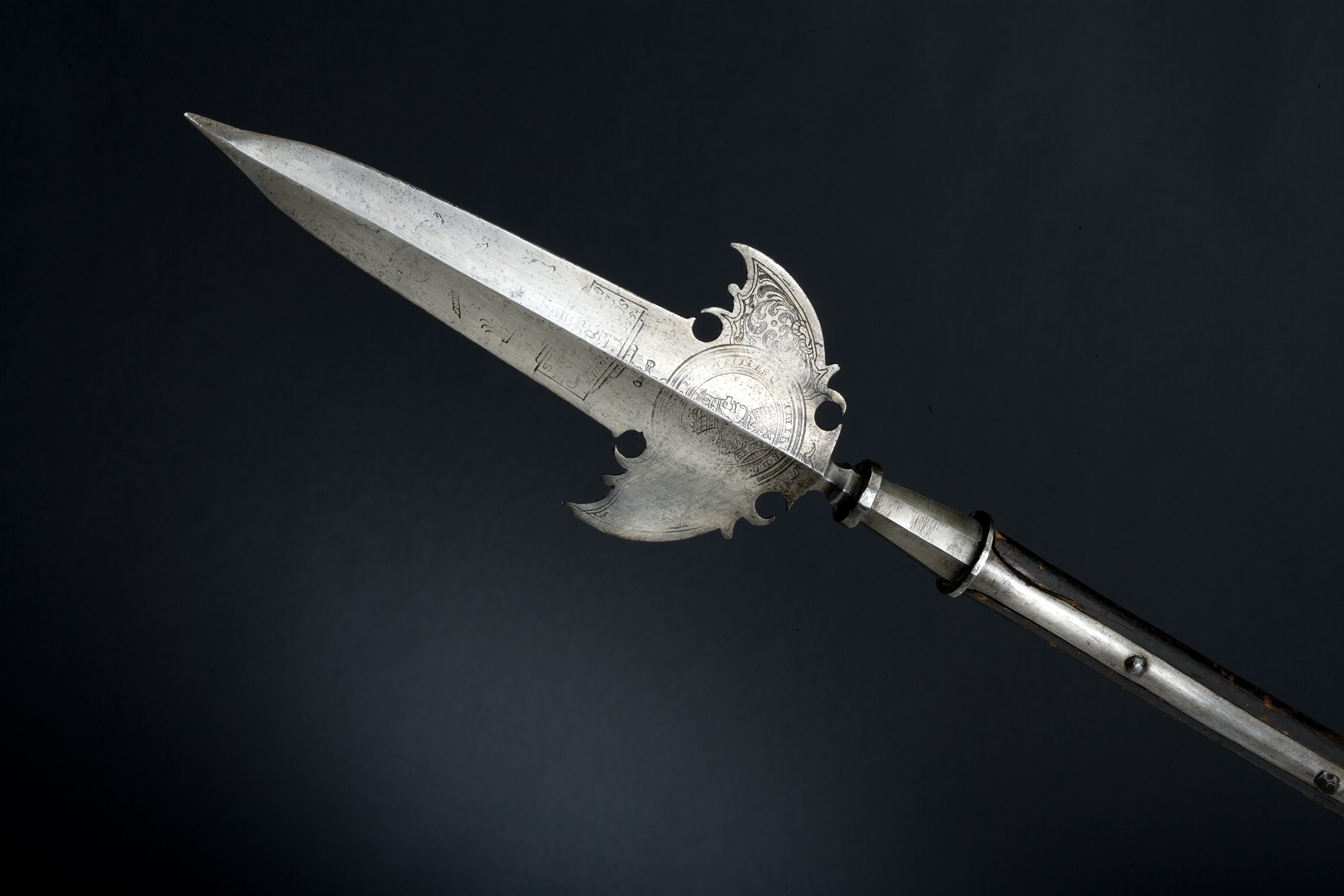
A Swedish officer's partisan from 1655

A partisan or partizan (from Middle French: partisane, via folk etymology, from pertuisane, "partisan"), a type of polearm, was used in Europe during the 16th, 17th, and 18th centuries. It consisted of a long swordlike spearhead mounted on a long wooden shaft, with protrusions on the sides which aided in parrying sword thrusts (blade catchers).

The partisan was often used by infantry soldiers, who would deploy the weapon to fend off cavalry charges. The protrusions on the sides of the spearhead were useful for catching and trapping an opponent's sword, allowing the user to disarm the opposition. In profile, the head of a partisan may look similar to other types of polearm, such as the halberd, pike, ranseur, spontoon, ox tongue, or spetum.

The arrival of practical firearms and bayonet led to the obsolescence of the partisan and of other polearms. Despite this, partisans continued in use for many years as a ceremonial weapon. Ceremonial partisans can still be seen in the hands of guards at important buildings or events.

== Gallery ==
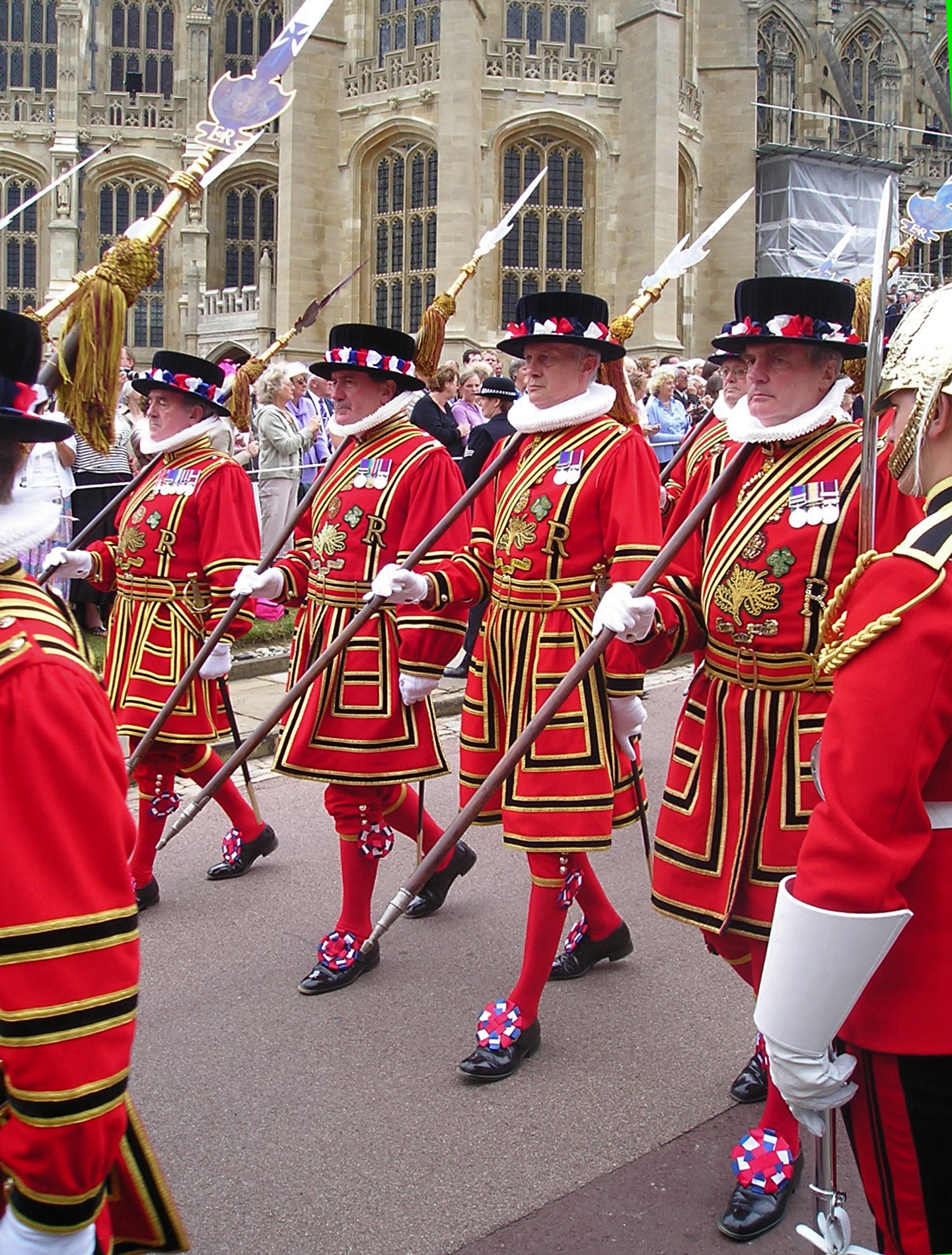
Yeomen of the Guard with partisans

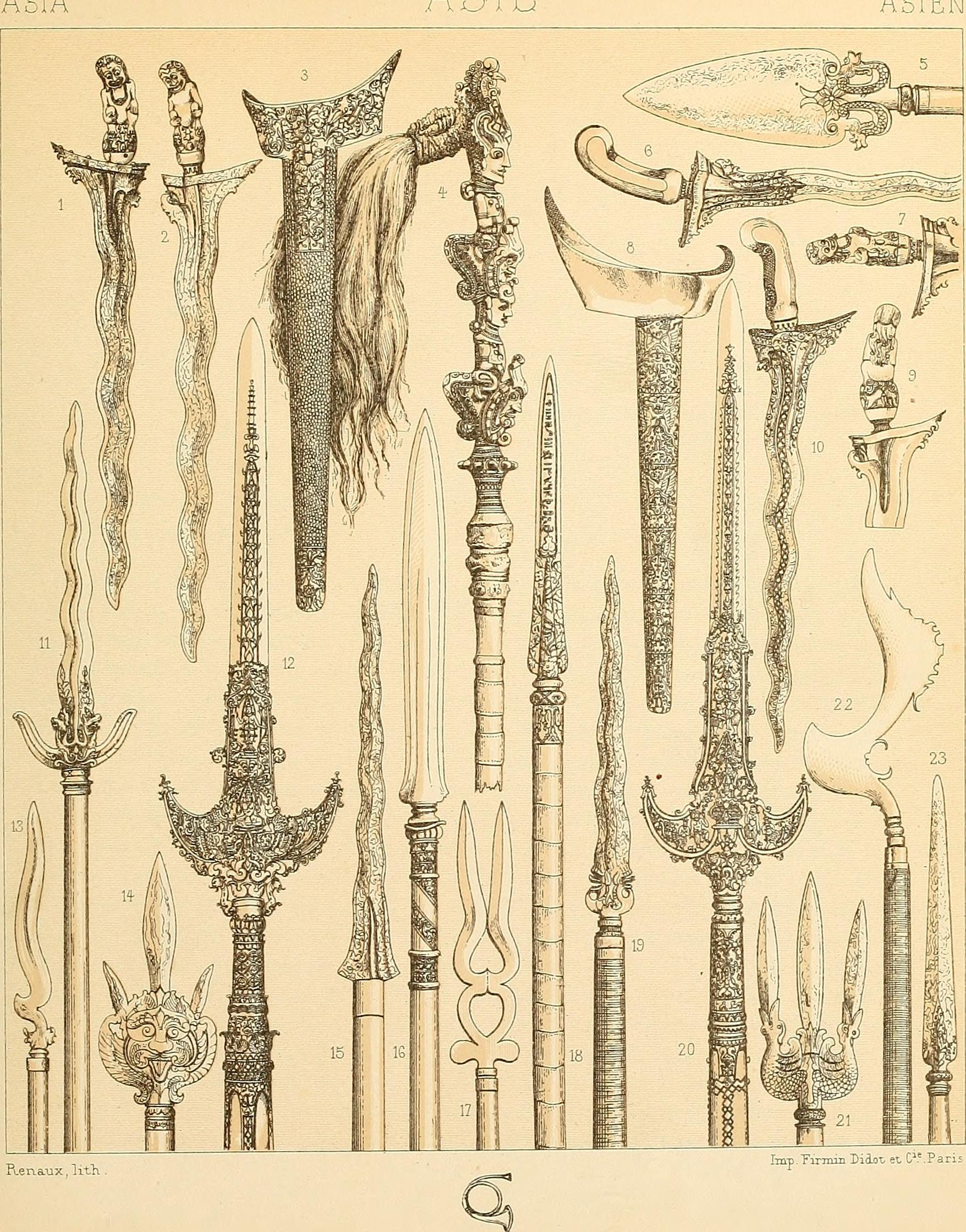
Indonesian weapons, including partisans

== See also ==
- Glaive
- Hǫggspjót
- Ox tongue spear
- Rogátina (Russian: рога́тина)
- Sovnya (Russian: совня)
- Spontoon
- Swordstaff
