= Lanzalonga =

Medieval Italian polearm

Lanza Longa sometimes also known in Italian as gialda.; modernly known scholarly mostly as lanzalonga, the term was also, normally, translated in Tudor period english as Long Spear, was a medieval polearm typical of Italian municipal infantry, a type of spear between 3 and 4.5 meters long

Known as "lanza longa" (long lance) precisely for the minimum length of its rod of at least 3 meters, it served to counter the charges of the enemy cavalry by forming in front of it the forehead of a forest of spikes. The blade was generally leafy - but varied in length, thickness, width - and the rod was round in section. It evolves or is replaced by the even longer pike.

In detail the lanzalonga was specifically an infantry weapon, a spear, typical of northern Italy; the shorter version known as the gialda was more commonly in use in central Italy, particularly in Tuscany, and was, technically, a long lance used by both infantry and cavalry. The later Lanza Longa as was more commonly known in the British islands was a shorter version used for training and in duels and its use was taught by most of the more famous manuals of the period.
