= List of Inuyasha chapters (199–398) =

21st tankōbon volume cover, released by Shogakukan on June 18, 2001

The chapters of the Inuyasha manga series were written and illustrated by Rumiko Takahashi. The manga was serialized in Shogakukan's shōnen manga magazine Weekly Shōnen Sunday from 1996 to 2008. Chapters 199–398 were collected in 20 tankōbon volumes, consisting of volumes 21 to 40, released from June 18, 2001, to May 18, 2005.

In North America, Inuyasha has been licensed for English language release by Viz Media. Volumes 21 to 40 were released from April 12, 2005, to September 8, 2009. Up until the 37th volume, Viz Media published the series in left-to-right orientation, and with the release of the 38th volume on July 14, 2009, they published the remaining volumes in "unflipped" right-to-left page layout.

== Volumes ==
No.	Title	Original release date	English release date
21	Yet Another Naraku	June 18, 2001; 4-09-125641-4	April 12, 2005; 978-1-59116-740-2
199. "The Stone Flower" (石の花, "Ishi no Hana"); 200. "Shattered Dream" (砕かれた夢, "Kudakareta Yume"); 201. "Naraku's Scent" (奈落の臭い, "Naraku no Nioi"); 202. "The Vortex of Bones" (骨の渦, "Hone no Uzu"); 203. "Desertion" (逃亡, "Tōbō"); 204. "Sunrise" (夜明け, "Yoake"); 205. "The Half-Demon's Secret" (半妖の秘密, "Han'yō no Himitsu"); 206. "The Princess in the Mountains" (山の中の姫, "Yama no Naka no Hime"); 207. "A Maiden's Heart" (乙女心, "Otomegokoro"); 208. "The Man Without a Face" (顔のない男, "Kao no nai Otoko")
An orphaned girl, Satsuki, hopes that the fake shard will resurrect her brother. Shippo brings her to the house of the village headman, where the group stays, after Miroku exorcized a lizard demon. Kagome and Sango tell Shippo that the shard is a quartz crystal. Shippo tries to it for Satsuki, but Inuyasha stops him. The lizard demon returns, disguised as Satsuki's brother, and takes her hostage. Shippo helps her escape, while Inuyasha and Miroku kill the demon, and credit Shippo for it. Rather than remaining in her family's empty hut, Satsuki is adopted by the headman's family. Koga and Inuyasha's two groups find Naraku's scent from a different castle. Kagura fails to remove the jewel shards from Koga. Inuyasha's group arrives, before Kagura steals Koga's shards and flees. As both groups pursue her, Kagura offers the shards to Sesshomaru. When he refuses, she tries to fight her pursuers. She drops the shards when Koga hits her, but she discovers Inuyasha transforming from human to half-demon, exposing his weakness on the night of the new moon. After fleeing, Kagura returns to the castle, where Naraku threatens to reabsorb her if she betrays her. Koga retrieves the shards and leaves Inuyasha's group. A beautiful princess is bewitching men from their village into a mountain and stealing their youth. Miroku and Sango investigate, but a spiritual barrier separates them. The "princess" tries to seduce Miroku, but Sango interrupts and exposes the true form of a dog-demon, which Miroku exorcises. Sango kills the dog-demon and Miroku comforts the freed princess, a long-dead spirit ascending to heaven. The villagers regain their youth and return home. Sango begins to make a relationship with Miroku. Bandits find a large, random lump of flesh and stab it. Naraku's past incarnation emerges as a faceless man, who kills anyone by stealing faces. A monk named Muso tries to exorcise the demon, but it kills him and decides to keep his face and name. A woman tells Inuyasha's group what happened. When they investigate the abandoned village, Inuyasha learns that Muso knows nothing of Naraku.
22	Cast-Off Heart	August 9, 2001; 4-09-125642-2	July 12, 2005; 978-1-59116-840-9
209. Peerless (無双, "Musō"); 210. Onigumo's Memories (鬼蜘蛛の記憶, "Onigumo no Kioku"); 211. Onigumo and Muso (鬼蜘蛛と無双, "Onigumo to Musō"); 212. The Heart (心臓, "Shinzō"); 213. Naraku the Half-Demon (半妖 奈落, "Han'yō Naraku"); 214. The Ogre Bats (百鬼蝙蝠, "Hyakki Kōmori"); 215. Shiori's Shield (紫織の結界, "Shiori no Kekkai"); 216. A Father's Wish (父の願い, "Chichi no Negai"); 217. Shiori's Power (紫織の力, "Shiori no Chikara"); 218. The Scarlet Blade (赤い刃, "Akai Yaiba")
The group identifies Muso as Onigumo, Naraku's original human core. Naraku orders Kagura to find Muso. Guided to the cave by the saimyosho, Muso recovers Onigumo's memory. Kagura tells Inuyasha's group where Muso is, and they save Kaede. Muso tells them Onigumo did not want Naraku to kill Kikyo. After fighting Muso for a while, Inuyasha aims at his spider mark, but Muso forcefully fuses with Naraku. Naraku admits that he needs Onigumo to re-assemble himself during his periods of vulnerability as a half-demon. Naraku and Kagura leave. Inuyasha asks Toto-sai how to break any barrier with Tetsusaiga. Myoga tells him to kill a certain ogre-bat who can create a powerful barrier, but the ogre that Myoga mentions has died. The ogre's half-human daughter is being raised by the lord of the ogre-bats, her grandfather, to maintain the barrier in her father's place. When the bats raid Shiori's former village, Inuyasha's group saves her human mother from the villagers. The ogre-bat lord had promised to spare the village, if they gave him Shiori, but he refuses to honor the promise and he threatens to kill Shiori's mother. The others hide behind the ogre-bat lord, who holds Shiori hostage. The grandfather admits that he killed his son himself for consorting with humans. To avenge her father, Shiori escapes all the ogres from the barrier and Inuyasha destroys them. Inuyasha kills the ghost of Shiori's grandfather and Tetsusaiga receives the red magical barrier breaking ability from breaking the orb.
23	Two Brothers, One Enemy	November 17, 2001; 4-09-125643-0	September 4, 2005; 978-1-4215-0024-9
219. "Kidnapped" (さらわれた りん, "Sarawareta Rin"); 220. "Naraku's Design" (奈落の目的, "Naraku no Mokuteki"); 221. "Slicing the Shield" (結界を斬る, "Kekkai o Kiru"); 222. "Signal to Kohaku" (琥珀への暗示, "Kohaku he no Anji"); 223. "The Abandoned Castle" (残された城, "Nokosareta Shiro"); 224. "Intermission" (休息, "Kyūsoku"); 225. "The Monster in the Ruins" (城跡の化け物, "Shiroato no Bakemono"); 226. "Where is Naraku?" (奈落の行方, "Naraku no Yukue"); 227. "Lost Scent" (消えた気配, "Kieta Kehai"); 228. "The Ogre's Head" (鬼の首城, "Oni no Kubijou")
When Naraku kidnaps Rin, Sesshomaru follows them. Inuyasha's group splits up, when Kagome senses the jewel shard embedded in Kohaku. Naraku says that he lured in Sesshomaru to be devoured, and they fight. Inuyasha cuts through the spiritual barrier around Naraku's castle. Naraku sends Kagura to stop him, sending the demons and saimyosho to watch her. As Inuyasha destroys the demons, Kagura makes a pretense at fighting him and flees. When Naraku traps Sesshomaru, Inuyasha distracts Naraku. Telling them that Kohaku will kill Rin, Naraku escapes from them. Before Kohaku can kill Rin, Sesshomaru finds them. Inuyasha subdues and saves Kohaku from Sesshomaru. Kohaku escapes with Kagura. Miroku surprises Sango by comforting her about Kohaku. Kagome continues to studying. The small leftover fragments of Naraku under his castle combine into a giant hair-ball demon with a mouth. As Koga and Inuyasha argue, the hair-ball comes after the jewel shards. Koga saves Kagome and Inuyasha fights the hairball, but it breaks away and goes after them, saying that Naraku is going where no one can touch him. Koga rips the hair-ball apart and leaves. Kikyo's soul collectors cannot find Naraku's aura. A dying elderly bandit asks her to take his top-knot to Mount Hakurei so its spiritual purification can wipe away his sins. Inuyasha's group meets an old incompetent exorcist who leads them to a haunted castle whose lord seems possessed and kills any servants who approach his quarters. At night, an ogre's head appears in the sky above the castle, but their attacks go through it without effect.
24	Liars and Ogres and Monkeys...Oh, My!	December 18, 2001; 4-09-125644-9	January 17, 2006; 978-1-4215-0186-4
229. The Ogre of the Burial Mound (首塚の鬼, "Kubidzuka no Oni"); 230. The Princess Vessel (依り代の姫, "Yorishiro no Hime"); 231. A Greater Aura (巨大な邪気, "Kyodai-na Jaki"); 232. The Venerable Monkey God (猿神さま, "Sarugami-sama"); 233. The Holy Object (ご神体の行方, "Go-shintai no Yukue"); 234. The Ghost (亡霊, "Bōrei"); 235. Kyokotsu (凶骨, "Kyōkotsu"); 236. The Band of Seven (七人隊, "Shichinin-tai"); 237. Jyakotsu (蛇骨, "Jakotsu"); 238. Poison Smoke (毒の煙, "Doku no Kemuri")
Miroku learns that the apparition in the sky is an illusion distracting them from the real ogre, whose head was buried in an underground chamber that the castle's princess shows him. The ogre's escape turned the burial mound into a pit now filled with the remains of failed exorcists. The castle lord assumes the ogre's form to fight with Inuyasha. However, the princess is the real ogre in disguise and intends to kill Miroku, yielding enough spiritual power to restore its entire body. The ogre's paralyzing aura does not affect the old exorcist, who uses all of her purification salts to help Miroku break the spell on himself and Sango. Meanwhile, the ogre goes upstairs, where Kagome examines the real princess's corpse and the souls from previous victims are stored. It eats some of the souls and tries to get Kagome's jewel shards. Inuyasha realizes he was tricked and goes inside the castle. The ogre explains that it waited to escape from the mound because of hiding from Naraku, who wanted to absorb it but is now gone. Inuyasha injures the ogre and Miroku kills her with his wind tunnel. Addressing Inuyasha as "venerable dog god", some men beg him to save their village from rampaging monkeys. When he finds and defeats three monkey sprites, they give him a so-called peace offering: a stone that attaches itself to his hand and grows into a huge boulder. Inuyasha manages to lift the boulder and threatens to crush them. The monkeys tell Kagome they are finding the stone that houses the monkey god, who is the only one who can release Inuyasha. They return to the village and search for the stone. Kagome realizes the monkey-god's stone is being used to weigh down vegetables in a pickling vat. The villages promise to build a new shrine to the monkey god, who releases Inuyasha. The monkey god says that Naraku's aura recently passed nearby toward the northeast, but suddenly disappeared instead of fading into the distance. A dying wolf tells Koga about a terrible demon-devouring ghost in the north. This "ghost" is a giant human resurrected by a jewel shard in his forehead: Kyokotsu, a member of the Band of Seven. When Kohaku warns Kyokotsu about Koga, Kyokotsu attacks Kohaku and tries to take his shard. He fights him off and leaves before Koga arrives. Koga kills Kyokotsu, before the saimyosho takes the shard. Kohaku warns Jakotsu, another member of the Band of Seven, about Inuyasha. Jakotsu, a homosexual sadist, uses a hinged multisection "snake bone" sword against Inuyasha and is offended by Sango. Jakotsu fights Inuyasha. Mukotsu, another of the Band of Seven, paralyzes Kagome.
25	The Battle with the Band of Seven Rages On!	March 18, 2002; 4-09-125645-7	April 18, 2006; 978-1-4215-0383-7
239. Mukotsu (霧骨, "Mukotsu"); 240. Naraku's Pursuers (奈落を追う者, "Naraku o Ou-mono"); 241. Ginkotsu (銀骨, "Ginkotsu"); 242. Renkotsu's Temple (煉骨の寺, "Renkotsu no Tera"); 243. The Scent of the Seven (七人隊の臭い, "Shichinin-tai no Nioi"); 244. The Lives of One's Companions (仲間の命, "Nakama no Inochi"); 245. The Burial Mound (七人塚, "Shichinindzuka"); 246. The Unsullied Light (汚れなき光, "Kegarenaki Hikari"); 247. Suikotsu (睡骨, "Suikotsu"); 248. The Two Souls (ふたつの心, "Futatsu no Kokoro")
Shippo keeps Inuyasha away from Jakotsu. Mukotsu knocks Kagome, Miroku and Sango unconscious. Immune to the poison, Sesshomaru kills Mukotsu and asks the others about Naraku. A saimyosho takes the shard, but Inuyasha accompanies his friends. Jakotsu observes all of this from a distance and reports to Renkotsu. Inuyasha goes somewhere for Kagome, Sango and Miroku to recover. Inuyasha sends Shippo ahead with the others, but Ginkotsu attacks Kirara as she carries them to a temple. Inuyasha's wind scar opens a chasm in the ground that engulfs Ginkotsu. When Inuyasha reaches the temple, Renkotsu, disguised as a priest, questions him about Naraku, but Ginkotsu interrupts to resume the fight. Renkotsu steals Kagome's shards, burns the temple, and uses fire to help Ginkotsu. Myoga, Shippo and Kirara, immune to the poison, protect their human friends. Inuyasha distracts Ginkotsu and runs past Renkotsu, who flees as saimyosho collect Ginkotsu's body. Inuyasha carries his friends from the temple, but they stop breathing until Myoga removes the poison from them. Jakotsu attacks Koga, but he heads for the temple, where he accuses Inuyasha. Kikyo finds Doctor Suikotsu healing people in a village near Mount Hakurei. Surprised that a member of the Band of Seven is apparently a good man with a pure jewel shard, Kikyo helps him cure people at his clinic. Inuyasha attacks Suikotsu, but is interrupted by Ginkotsu, Renkotsu and Jakotsu. When the doctor protests their actions, Jakotsu attacks him, while Ginkotsu and Renkotsu take on Inuyasha's group and Kikyo. The doctor transforms into Suikotsu of the Band of Seven, tainting his jewel shard. As Suikotsu fights Inuyasha, Miroku saves Kikyo. When the children plead with Suikotsu, the other members of the Band of Seven drag him away to keep him from transforming back into the kindly doctor. At Kagome's suggestion, Inuyasha carries Kikyo away from Mount Hakurei, so her soul collectors can protect her.
26	The Sacred Mountain	June 18, 2002; 4-09-125646-5	July 18, 2006; 978-1-4215-0466-7
249. The Shield of Hakurei (白霊山の結界, "Hakureizan no Kekkai"); 250. Bankotsu (蛮骨, "Bankotsu"); 251. The Clash (激突, "Gekitotsu"); 252. Sanctuary's Edge (聖域の境目, "Seiiki no Sakaime"); 253. Retreat (撤退, "Tettai"); 254. The Scratch on Banryu (蛮竜の傷, "Banryū no Kizu"); 255. The Sacred Island (聖島, "Hijirijima"); 256. The Center of the Shield (結界の中心, "Kekkai no Chūshin"); 257. The Dokko (独鈷, "Dokko"); 258. The Living Mummy (即身仏, "Sokushinbutsu")
Kikyo and her soul collectors cannot approach Mount Hakurei, but Inuyasha's group goes to investigate it. Because of the way the mountain's purifying barrier affects demons, half-demons, and even Miroku (for his occasional vices as a lecher and con-man), they learn that Naraku is hidden inside the hideout. The entire Band of Seven attacks the castle of the lord who originally executed them. The band's leader, Bankotsu, retrieves his halberd, Banryu, luring Inuyasha and the others there. Koga arrives there to fight them. Bankotsu has three jewel shards in his neck: his own, Kyokotsu's, and Mukotsu's. Renkotsu already stole Kagome's shards earlier, but targets her again to keep Bankotsu from finding that out. Rin follows Kohaku through the purifying barrier (where Jaken cannot follow) to a cave full of Naraku's demons. Kohaku warns Rin to leave before they can kill her. Rin tells Sesshomaru that Kohaku saved her from Naraku's demons. Naraku orders the Band of Seven to retreat. Inuyasha's group pursues them, but is blocked by a demon puppet that has a strange purity instead of Naraku's normal aura. Inuyasha destroys the puppet and the group continues its pursuit, but Koga is blocked by the purifying barrier. Kohaku and Kanna give new orders to the Band of Seven. Kanna suggests using the stolen shards for Bankotsu, making the mistrust against Renkotsu. Inuyasha's group find a place with the same scent as the strange demon puppet: Hijiri Island, where Bankotsu appears at the ransacked tomb-shrine of Saint Hakushin. His body disappeared, but his dokko (the magic tool used during his lifetime) still emits a purifying aura until Miroku neutralizes it, allowing Inuyasha to use the wind-scar. Banryu blocks the attack and the dokko re-energizes, reducing Tetsusaiga to a normal sword, then teleports itself and Bankotsu away to another temple where the saint waits with Kohaku and Kanna. Inuyasha's group decide that the saint is helping Naraku and they return to the mountain. Miroku and Sango enter the barrier while the others wait outside. Kikyo notices that the barrier is too strong. Renkotsu and Ginkotsu ambush Koga.
27	The Unlikely Allies	September 18, 2002; 4-09-125647-3	October 17, 2006; 978-1-4215-0467-4
259. Explosion (爆発, "Bakuhatsu"); 260. Faces (顔, "Kao"); 261. Suikotsu's Village (睡骨の村, "Suikotsu no Mura"); 262. The Tainted Gleam (黒い光, "Kuroi Hikari"); 263. Suikotsu's Memory (睡骨の記憶, "Suikotsu no Kioku"); 264. The River of Fire (炎の川, "Honō no Kawa"); 265. The Mountain Cave (白霊山の洞窟, "Hakureizan no Dōketsu"); 266. The Corridor (回廊, "Kairō"); 267. The Limit (限界, "Genkai"); 268. Hakushin the Holy (白心上人, "Hakushin Shōnin")
After Koga kills Ginkotsu, Suikotsu and Jakotsu take Rin hostage, and lure Sesshomaru. As Sesshomaru fights both of them, Kikyo fires a sacred arrow into Suikotsu to revert him as a doctor, who pleads for death to end his suffering. Jakotsu kills Suikotsu to steal the shard. Except for Miroku and Sango, who are inside the barrier, Inuyasha's group brings Koga to a cave to recover. Renkotsu traps the others in the river of fire near the cave. Inuyasha fights Renkotsu at the river without his robe, which Kagome uses it to save herself and the others. Renkotsu attempts to kill everyone with the dynamites, but Inuyasha pushes Renkotsu out of the cave and they fall towards the river canyon. In the aftermath, Inuyasha reappears, and returns to Koga and Kagome. Miroku and Sango notice that the purification does not extend all the way into a cave, letting them sense Naraku's aura. Inside the mountain, Kagura attacks with some saimyosho to keep Miroku from using his wind tunnel, though he can still use sacred sutras while Sango uses her boomerang. When Kagura separates them and knocks Sango unconscious, Miroku leaps across the gap to reach Sango and opens his wind tunnel, knowing he would rather die with her. Miroku tries to carry Sango, but succumbs to the venom. Renkotsu discards the dynamites, emerges downstream and encounters Bankotsu. Jakotsu gives Suikotsu's shard to Bankotsu who says that he is the only one to trust. Inuyasha enters the mountain alone in search of Sango and Miroku. When Inuyasha reaches the barrier's limit for a half-demon, Renkotsu prevents him from reaching further. Instead, Inuyasha reverts into a human form and runs into a cave. Renkotsu sends Jyakotsu in after him. Miroku tells Sango to go on by herself, but she cries and says that she would rather stay and die with him. They realize they have crossed back into the purifying barrier, preventing Naraku's demons from finishing them off. Miroku recovers from the venom. They find the temple containing the mummified and living Buddha, Saint Hakushin.
28	The Rebirth of Naraku	December 5, 2002; 4-09-125648-1	January 9, 2007; 978-1-4215-0468-1
269. Inside the Darkness (暗闇の中, "Kurayami no Naka"); 270. The Mountain Changes (白霊山の異変, "Hakureizan no Ihen"); 271. The Pulse (鼓動, "Kodō"); 272. The Sanctuary Destroyed (聖域の消滅, "Seiiki no Shōmetsu"); 273. Corridor's End (回廊の底, "Kairō no Soko"); 274. The Two Auras (ふたつの気配, "Futatsu no Kehai"); 275. Bankotsu's Strength (蛮骨の力, "Bankotsu no Chikara"); 276. Cut in Two (両断, "Ryōdan"); 277. The Wall of Flesh (肉壁, "Nikukabe"); 278. Resurrection (新生, "Shinsei")
Saint Hakushin says that his soul was in darkness for a long time before he was rescued by Naraku, which is why he is helping him now despite knowing that he is the vilest of demons. Miroku uses his wind tunnel until the temple disintegrates, but the reappearance of saimyosho lets Hakushin escape with just a small spiritual shield around him. Because of his human form, Inuyasha is losing to Jakotsu, who wants to kill him slowly to make him plead and scream. The purifying barrier weakens, letting Inuyasha transform back into a half-demon and leaving Jakotsu crippled, he goes after Naraku's strengthening aura. Renkotsu kills Jakotsu and takes the shard. The saimyosho report this to Bankotsu, who kills Renkotsu and blocks Inuyasha's path to Naraku. Inuyasha cuts Bankotsu in half. Kikyo shows Hakushin how Naraku tricked him. His soul at peace, Hakushin ascends to Heaven and drops the entire barrier. Without it, Naraku's aura pours out of the mountain and many demons escape. Kagura drops Miroku and Sango deep into the mountain, where they find the remains of some baby-like creations of Naraku. Koga, Kagome, Shippo and Kirara, enter the mountain looking for the others. The rock of the mountain turns into flesh, trapping Kagome, Inuyasha and Koga. Naraku appears and tells them that he is sacrificing the mountain and Bakotsu to reveal his true form. He takes all of the jewel shards to complete the transformation to his new and vastly more powerful one. Inuyasha's wind-scar just bounces around inside the mountain and Naraku says that it will kill Inuyasha and his friends.
29	Naraku's Perfect New Form	March 18, 2003; 4-09-125649-X	April 10, 2007; 978-1-4215-0900-6
279. Maelstrom of Evil (妖気の渦, "Yōki no Uzu"); 280. His True Purpose (真の目的, "Shin no Mokuteki"); 281. The New Body (新しい体, "Atarashii Karada"); 282. Kikyo's Life (桔梗の命, "Kikyō no Inochi"); 283. Inuyasha's True Feelings (犬夜叉の本心, "Inuyasha no Honshin"); 284. Darkness in the Heart (心の闇, "Kokoro no Yami"); 285. Suggestion (暗示, "Anji"); 286. The Discarded Heart (捨てた心, "Suteta Kokoro"); 287. Thousand-Mile Ears (耳千里, "Mimisenri"); 288. The Colony of Ogre Women (鬼女の集落, "Oni-onna no Shūraku")
Naraku traps Inuyasha's wind-scar into bouncing around inside Mount Hakurei to reduce it into nothingness. Seeing Kagura leaving the mountain with an infant, Kikyo narrowly misses them with a sacred arrow. The infant stops Kagura from fighting back. Kagome shoots a sacred arrow at Naraku to break his control of the wind-scar and free Koga. As Naraku leaves the group in the destruction of Mount Hakurei, Miroku and Sango escape on Kirara, Kagome on Shippo, and Inuyasha saves Koga. Naraku wounds Kikyo and sends her to the river of miasma. As Naraku flees, Sesshomaru says nothing to Inuyasha about Kikyo. Naraku removes his human heart. Inuyasha continues to find Kikyo, after hearing from the monk. When the soldiers arrest the rest of the group, Shippo and Kirara escape to get Inuyasha, but the others are captured. The monk turns out to be a corpse animated by Kagura's dance of the dead. Kagura still has the infant, who searches Kagome's soul and tries to control her with jealousy of Inuyasha and Kikyo. Inuyasha subdues the soldiers, but Kagura carries Kagome away, hoping to make her find more jewel shards. Kagura cannot embed a tainted shard into Kagome before Inuyasha rescues her, but his wind-scar reflects back at him from a shield around Kagura, Kanna and the infant. Inuyasha and Kagome argue about Kikyo, and Kagome returns home. Naraku finds out that the last jewel shard is in the netherworld. Inuyasha brings Kagome back to the feudal era. A village of women worships a hanging picture scroll that flays men, whose skinned bodies the women dump into a river. Inuyasha's group meet Shinosuke in search of his missing fiancee, Wakana. The village of women falsely denies having Wakana but invites the group to stay the night, separating the women (Kagome, Sango, Kirara) from the men (Inuyasha, Miroku, Shippo, Shinosuke). The picture scroll tells Wakana to bring Shinosuke to the shrine.
30	A Hideous Demon Baby's Mission	May 17, 2003; 4-09-125650-3	July 10, 2007; 978-1-4215-0901-3
289. Hall of the Bodhisattva (観音堂, "Kannondō"); 290. A Demon in the Belly (腹の中の妖気, "Hara no Naka no Yōki"); 291. Where is Sango? (珊瑚の行方, "Sango no Yukue"); 292. Unique among Women (特別なおなご, "Tokubetsu-na Onago"); 293. Split in Half (分断, "Bundan"); 294. The Blazing Hoof (炎蹄, "Entei"); 295. Hakudoshi (白童子, "Hakudōshi"); 296. The Headless Demons (首のない妖怪, "Kubi no nai Yōkai"); 297. Between this World and the Next (あの世とこの世の境, "Ano Yo to kono Yo no Sakai"); 298. Hosenki (宝仙鬼, "Hōsenki")
When Kagome asks if she likes Miroku, Sango's overly vigorous denials reveal her jealousy. Kagome says that Miroku treasures Sango, just as Miroku walks by with a village woman whom he is offering to "comfort". The women of the village file past, Sango puts on her armor and follows them despite Kagome's suggestion to summon Inuyasha and Miroku first. Inuyasha and Kagome try to catch up with Sango, who reaches a lake where the women have apparently disappeared until they reach out of the water and drag Sango under. The village woman and Miroku are in the picture scroll's shrine, engaging in foreplay until he is attacked by a salamander demon who was skinned and sealed into the scroll. Naraku allowed it to escape, but it needs the skins of men to restore its normal form and is controlling the village women via its eggs in their stomachs. Just outside the shrine, Wakana breaks through the control long enough to tell Shinosuke to run. Miroku injures the demon and it flees towards the lake. He sends two women to drive the demon's eggs out of their stomachs and free them from its control. At the lake, Miroku joins Inuyasha and Kagome fighting against the village women and the demon. Inuyasha kills the demon, but the women keep fighting. Miroku and Kirara go into the lake to find Sango, who has been possessed by an egg and injures Miroku several times before he can punch her stomach and release her. Inuyasha and Kagome destroy the other eggs. Shinosuke and Wakana return to their home village. Miroku proposes to Sango; she accepts, agreeing to have as many children as he wants, and asks him to stop chasing other women. He does not answer. Kagura takes Naraku's infant to various priests. She kills them and the infant interrogates their spirits about the afterlife. One priest cuts the infant in half, forming Akago and Hakudōshi. Kagura takes the two seemingly give halves to Kanna, who takes Akago and tells Kagura to care for Hakudoshi. That priest's death releases a flying horse demon, Entei, whom he had imprisoned. When Hakudoshi revives, now aged to a child, he accompanies Entei. Hakudoshi blocks Inuyasha's wind-scar with his spiritual barrier, telling them that he was Naraku's infant and saw a jewel shard in the afterlife. Hakudoshi takes a nagamaki to behead demons, using their heads to see into the afterlife, but loses the head of an otter demon when it washes away. The otter's son recovers the head and Inuyasha's group helps him find his father's body. Kagome and Shippo convince Sesshomaru to revive the otter demon, who tells them about his experience in the afterlife. Inuyasha and Kagome recognize the place in the afterlife as the grave-site of Inuyasha's father. Myoga tells them to ask an oyster demon, Hosenki, for a pearl which can link this world and the next. Hosenki's son says that his father died of old age and it will take the son 100 years to make a pearl for them. The saimyosho informs Hakudoshi about another path. He has Kagura tell Inuyasha about the gate in the realm of fire, before Inuyasha can force the gate open.
31	The Demon of the Birds	July 18, 2003; 4-09-126661-4	October 9, 2007; 978-1-4215-0902-0
299. The Gatekeepers (門の番人, "Mon no Bannin"); 300. The Opened Gate (開かれた門, "Hirakareta Mon"); 301. Beyond the Gate (門のむこう, "Mon no Mukō"); 302. Princess Abi (阿毘姫, "Abi-hime"); 303. The Trident (三叉戟, "Sansageki"); 304. Hijiri's Village (聖さまの里, "Hijiri-sama no Sato"); 305. An Abandoned Arrow (残された矢, "Nokosareta Ya"); 306. The Village Shield (里の結界, "Sato no Kekkai"); 307. The Forbidden Mountain (禁域の山, "Kin'iki no Yama"); 308. The Waterfall Basin (滝壺, "Takitsubo")
Inuyasha's group follows the saimyōshō to the fire realm's gate to the afterlife. Two giant statues, Gozu and Mezu, guard the gate and try to kill him because the living are not allowed to cross over. Inuyasha breaks the chain that holds the gate closed. Kagura and Naraku's demons try to pass through the open gate ahead of him. The demons are petrified by the light from the other side, but Kagura escapes. Kagome senses the missing jewel shard beyond the gate which closes again, stilling Gozu and Mezu. Kagura cuts Hakudoshi in half for sending her to test the gate and probably die, but Hakudoshi regenerates and Naraku punishes Kagura. Inuyasha's group looks for another path to the afterlife. The bird-demon Princess Abi orders her flock to collect human blood for an antidote to the poison her mother swallowed. Naraku lends her a trident made from his bones, which generates a protective barrier around her. Inuyasha's group pass through many villages whose inhabitants have been drained of blood. They finally reach a surviving village, where the bird demons ignites the houses to drive the people out from shelter. Miroku uses his wind tunnel, but saimyosho force him to stop. Princess Abi attacks Inuyasha's group; he counter-attacks with the wind scar, but the trident saves Abi. She flees. Looking for Sesshomaru, Kagura approaches Rin and Jaken. Jaken says that if Sesshomaru were present, he would kill her. She agrees and leaves, deciding to find and kill Akago in order to kill Naraku. Kanna gives Akago to a noble lady in place of the lady's stillborn child. The bird demon's nest is hidden by a spiritual shield made by Naraku. Inuyasha's groups encounters refugees traveling to the village of a holy woman who can protect them from the bird demons. The holy woman's whole body is veiled and she communicates through her assistants, Kochō and Asuka. Inuyasha's group is attacked by some bird demons backed up by Kagura, Hakudoshi, and Entei, but they realize that this is a diversion while Princess Abi and the main force of bird demons attack the holy woman's village. Hakudoshi's barrier deflects Inuyasha's wind scar, but the holy woman appears and breaks the barrier with a sacred arrow. Inuyasha kills Entei and Kagura flees with Hakudoshi. The holy woman disappears, although she lacks the same scent, but Inuyasha's and Naraku's groups both suspect that she is Kikyo. At the village, Princess Abi and the bird demons are held at bay by a spiritual shield, which Asuka tells the villagers to stay inside even when the demons cover the shield with fire. The holy woman returns, kills the bird demons with a sacred arrow, and pursues Princess Abi when she flees. Inuyasha's group hear what happened at the village and look for the holy woman, figuring that Naraku will try to kill her. Kocho and Asuka take soil from Kikyo's grave, fly to the forbidden mountain, and pour it into a pool at the base of a waterfall. Naraku's demons come to the mountain; some of them are destroyed by a sacred arrow from the holy woman and the rest fight with Inuyasha's group. When Inuyasha meets the holy woman. Kocho and Asuka tell him that she is dying from Naraku's miasma and cannot speak. After cutting down the holy woman, who appears to be Kikyo's spirit but dissolves away, Kagura says that the sacred arrows were smeared with soil from Onigumo's cave to make them toxic to Naraku and his incarnations. Kagome follows soul collectors to the waterfall, where she sees Kikyo drowning in the pool. Kocho and Asuka request Kagome to save Kikyo.
32	River of Blood	September 18, 2003; 4-09-126662-2	January 8, 2008; 978-1-4215-1522-9
309. The Choice (選択, "Sentaku"); 310. The Angry Heart (苛立つ心, "Iradatsu Kokoro"); 311. The Castle (城, "Shiro"); 312. Orders (命令, "Meirei"); 313. Restored Memory (罪の記憶, "Tsumi no Kioku"); 314. A Broken Spell (解けた呪縛, "Toketa Jubaku"); 315. The Scent of the Nest (鳥の巣の臭い, "Tori no Su no Nioi"); 316. The Arrow Passes On (託された矢, "Takusareta Ya"); 317. The Steel Fowl (鉄鶏, "Tekkei"); 318. The River of Blood (血の河, "Chi no Kawa")
Kagome purifies the miasma to save Kikyo, but she leaves without thanking her. Princess Abi and her mother attack the castle where Akago is hidden. Inuyasha's group arrive and help Kohaku defend the castle. Princess Abi and her birds escape with the blood of most of the castle's inhabitants. Under Naraku's orders, Kohaku kills the people around Akago, whom Kanna takes away. Sango confronts Kohaku before Kagura carries him away. He remembers everything and secretly decides to kill Naraku. Kagura realizes that Akago is Naraku's heart. Princess Abi's mother consumes enough human blood to recovers from her illness. Via Inuyasha, Kikyo gives Kagome a special arrow which can destroy Naraku. By killing Princess Abi and beheading her mother, Naraku produces a river of blood that carries Naraku and Inuyasha's group to the borderland between this world and the afterlife. Kagome sees the last shard of the sacred jewel in the remains of Inuyasha's father. They are attacked with spears of diamond. Sesshomaru arrives too late to use the river of blood, but Kagura directs him to the gate in the realm of fire.
33	Allies and Enemies	December 5, 2003; 4-09-126663-0	April 8, 2008; 978-1-4215-1828-2
319. The Will of the Shard (かけらの意思, "Kakera no Ishi"); 320. The Arrow that Fell Short (届かぬ矢, "Todokanu Ya"); 321. The Spreading Taint (広がる汚れ, "Hirogaru Kegare"); 322. The Unbreakable Shield (破れぬ結界, "Yaburenu Kekkai"); 323. The Final Shard (最後のかけら, "Saigo no Kakera"); 324. Tested (試される資格, "Tamesareru Shikaku"); 325. Diamond Spears (金剛槍破, "Kongōsōha"); 326. The Way Home (帰還, "Kikan"); 327. The Shrine Rat (厨子鼠, "Zushinezumi"); 328. The Demon Lure (魔寄せ, "Mayose")
Myoga introduces the late Hosenki, source of the diamond spears. Inuyasha fights Hosenki for the last shard of the sacred jewel, but Naraku takes it. Sesshomaru arrives at the gate in the realm of fire, and fights with Gozu and Mezu. Tenseiga forces them to submit and open the gate, allowing Sesshomaru to pass through to the afterlife and fight with Naraku. When Inuyasha defends his comrades at risk to himself, Hosenki helps by giving him the power to create diamond spears, or "adamant barrage", which destroyed the barrier. Kagome fires the special arrow at Naraku as he disappears. Sesshomaru and Inuyasha's group return from the afterlife through the gate. As Naraku reconstitutes himself in the world of the living, the arrow misses him and hits Hakudoshi, who survives because Akago also contains his heart with Naraku's. Naraku orders Hakudoshi and Kohaku to force Kikyo into the open to be destroyed. Hakudoshi and Kohaku kill a giant demon rat, and open the rat's shrine, releasing an infinite stream of demon rats that devour all living things in their path. Kikyo creates a demon tree to lure in and purify the demon rats. She escapes. Inuyasha and Kagome find the tree. Miroku and Sango find Kohaku in the shrine.
34	A Mountain That Lives	February 18, 2004; 4-09-126664-9	July 8, 2008; 978-1-4215-1829-9
329. Tree Blight (蝕まれた霊木, "Mushibamareta Reiboku"); 330. Rampage! (暴走する群れ, "Bōsō-suru Mure"); 331. A Human Heart (人の心, "Hito no Kokoro"); 332. Small Pleasures (小さな幸せ, "Chiisana Shiawase"); 333. Cocooning (宿り蛹, "Yadorisanagi"); 334. The Perfect Host (宿主, "Yadonushi"); 335. The Lost Mountain (消えた山, "Kieta Yama"); 336. Mountain Man (岳山人, "Gakusanjin"); 337. The Nulling Stone (不妖璧, "Fuyōheki"); 338. Harvesting Souls (魄, "Haku")
Kohaku, still pretending to be amnesic, protects the shrine from Miroku and Sango's attack. Meanwhile, Hakudoshi attacks the demon lure tree with giant slugs. Inuyasha and Kagome kill the slugs, but the tree is blighted and the lure nullified. The shrine rats return to devastating the countryside. Inuyasha and Kagome find the shrine where the rats are attacking Miroku, Sango and Kohaku. A timely arrow from Kikyo allows Inuyasha to destroy the shrine with Tetsusaiga, and the rats disintegrate. Kohaku runs off. Later, while Inuyasha discusses Kikyo with Kaede, Kagome returns to the future without telling him. Inuyasha inadvertently destroys the bicycle. Inuyasha and Kagome return to the past in time to be victimized by Shippo's malicious pranks. He has been possessed by a parasitic nymph demon. Inuyasha scares the nymph off of Shippo who recovers. The gang follows the nymph back to its original host, Gakusanjin, a giant demon in the shape of a forested mountain. Gakusanjin was awakened from a 200 year slumber when Naraku stole Gakusanjin's nulling stone, an artifact that hides demonic auras. To help recover the nulling stone, Gakusanjin gives the group a fistful of crystals that fade when the stone is nearby. Kagura secretly observed this exchange, and acquires a few excess crystals. On his way to find Kanna, Kohaku meets Kikyo. Kagome senses the shard in Kohaku and directs the group to his position. Meanwhile, Naraku suddenly appears and attacks Kikyo. The group arrives in time to foil his attack. Kagura collects Kohaku. All now realize the strategic significance of the nulling stone, which Naraku gives to the infant. Hakudoshi and Kohaku team up to kill a demon that eats haku (life force). Later, Koga starts finding demon corpses and battles a demon patching together from different bodies.
35	Almost Human	May 18, 2004; 4-09-126665-7	October 14, 2008; 978-1-4215-1830-5
339. Prototypes (試作, "Shisaku"); 340. Moryomaru (魍魎丸, "Mōryōmaru"); 341. Corpses (残骸, "Zangai"); 342. Stolen Objects (奪われた物, "Ubawareta-mono"); 343. The Forgotten Fiancée (許嫁, "Iinazuke"); 344. Past Indiscretions (昔のあやまち, "Mukashi no Ayamachi"); 345. Forgiveness (記憶の糸, "Kioku no Ito"); 346. The Acolytes (行者, "Gyōja"); 347. Goryomaru (御霊丸, "Goryōmaru"); 348. The Deformed Arm (異形の腕, "Igyō no Ude")
Inuyasha, Kagome, Miroku, Sango, Shippo and Kirara arrive as Koga defeats a demon patched together from different corpses and is powered by haku. As they travel, the group battles patched-together demons that are increasingly more human in appearance. The group finally encounters Hakudoshi and Moryomaru, his latest amalgamation. The battle ends after Moryomaru steals from Miroku the crystals that can detect the nulling stone. Koga leaves. Kagura finds Sesshomaru and leaves one of her crystals to help him find Naraku's heart. Inuyasha and the group shelter at a home where two years ago, Miroku promised to marry Shima, the homeowner's daughter. Shima has been promised to the lake guardian in exchange for healing her illness. Shima pretends that Miroku and she consummated a relationship—the deception is to avoid marrying the lake guardian who wants a "pure" bride. Sango is upset and jealous. The guardian changes to his true form as a catfish demon. He tries to abduct Shima but is foiled by Sango. He then tries to abduct Sango. Miroku saves her, and Sango realizes that Miroku has strong feelings for her after all. Traveling on, the group encounters the corpse of Gakusanjin, the mountain demon. He has been killed by strange lights. The group encounters three boys carrying unusual urns which contain demons that take on the form of killer light rays. The group follows the children back to an unsettling temple where they meet Goryomaru. He is a priest whose right arm was replaced by a misshapen demon that is the source of the children's lights. After night falls, the temple is attacked by demon corpses created by Kagura.
36	A Question of Time	July 16, 2004; 4-09-126666-5	January 13, 2009; 978-1-4215-2218-0
349. The Swarm of Corpses (屍の群れ, "Shikabane no Mure"); 350. Kagura's Life (神楽の命, "Kagura no Inochi"); 351. The Rakanzo (羅漢像, "Rakanzō"); 352. Goryomaru's Fate (御霊丸の死, "Goryōmaru no Shi"); 353. The Ogre Cliff (鬼の岩, "Oni no Iwa"); 354. The Indestructible Wall (破れない壁, "Yaburenu Kabe"); 355. Using the Shard (かけらを使う, "Kakera o Tsukau"); 356. The Evil Presence (邪な気配, "Yokoshima-na Kehai"); 357. The Medicine Merchant (薬売り, "Kusuriuri"); 358. Illusion (幻術, "Genjutsu")
Kagura storms Goryomaru's temple, using demon corpses as her strike force. Goryomaru grabs Kagome, and strengthened by the shard she carries, fires his light rays at Kagura. He blasts a hole in Kagura's chest. Severely injured, Kagura breaks off the attack. She flies away and collapses in a stream near Sesshomaru who callously ignores her plight. Rin attempts to rescue her but is swept away by the rushing water. Jaken tries to help, but eventually, Sesshomaru has to save all three. Kagura heals and tells him the location of Goryomaru's temple where she now knows the infant was hiding. Kagura returns to the temple with Hakudoshi who begins battling Goryomaru. Inuyasha and the gang arrive to witness Hakudoshi behead Goryomaru. Kanna and the infant appear, and Hakudoshi covers their retreat. Kagura follows and allows the Inuyasha and the gang to discreetly trail her. The group enters an ogre-shaped cave. Naraku appears and tries to take the shard Kagome is carrying. The ogre-shaped cave comes alive. Miroku tries to destroy Naraku with the wind tunnel but is poisoned by the wasps. Naraku leaves, and the group is stuck in the belly of the ogre who is beginning to digest them. Inuyasha tries to blast out using diamond spears, but Naraku has strengthened the walls. Inuyasha desperately takes the shard from Kagome and embeds it in Tetsusaiga. The evil aura from the ogre taints the shard and flows into Inuyasha. He turns into full-demon form. Before Inuyasha can go on a rampage, Kagome flings her arms around him and purifies the tainted shard. Despite the acid burning her legs, Kagome holds onto Inuyasha, who still in full-demon form but clear-eyed and clear-headed, breaks free from the ogre. Meanwhile, Kikyo meets Kanna who is fleeing with the infant. A surprise attack from Moryomaru prevents Kikyo from killing the infant. Naraku gives Kagura the task of guarding an imprisoned and very-much-alive Goryomaru. The group follows rumors of a traveling medicine man who has a potion that counteract all poisons. This traveler is reputed to be "the most handsome man ever met", but seems to prey on women. Sango and Inuyasha set off to investigate. The traveler intoxicates Inuyasha and puts Sango under spell to drink her blood. Sango resists the spell, and contends with the man and a jealous Miroku. However, she allows the man to bite her in exchange for the magic potion which would help Miroku. Unfortunately, the man is a possessed mosquito, and the magic potion is a lie.
37	A Question of Time	September 17, 2004; 4-09-126667-3	April 14, 2009; 978-1-4215-2219-7
359. Roots (飛頭根, "Hitōkon"); 360. Memories (父の記憶, "Chichi no Kioku"); 361. Secrets (隠した想い, "Kakushita Omoi"); 362. Escape (脱牢, "Datsurō"); 363. Goryomaru's Identity (御霊丸の正体, "Goryōmaru no Shōtai"); 364. Metamorphosis (変貌, "Henbō"); 365. The Vanished Power (消えた妖気, "Kieta Yōki"); 366. The Vessel (器, "Utsuwa"); 367. Where is the Child? (赤子の居場所, "Akago no Ibasho"); 368. Kagura's Decision (神楽の決意, "Kagura no Ketsui")
Sent to find the demon Hitoukon, who can merge with weak forms and control them, Kohaku is injured and lets the Hitoukon escape. A father and son invite Kohaku to stay for the night, but the Hitoukon takes over the son's body. Kohaku remembers being manipulated into killing his own father, and wants to save the boy. Inuyasha's group chases after the Hitoukon and expels it. While Inuyasha takes care of the boy, Kohaku meets Sango again, but runs away to keep anyone from finding out that he is acting for himself. Hakudōshi tricks Kagura into freeing Goryomaru, in order to defy Naraku. While Sango and Miroku are lured away by rumors about bandits, Goryomaru finds Kagome and Shippo hiding with Inuyasha in his new-moon human form. He takes their jewel shard and absorbs it, then shows his true identity as Mouryoumaru, now with a soul and the ability to absorb youki (demon power). Sesshomaru learns that their crystal for detecting Naraku's heart shows no youki. He refuses to comply about the crystal, but Mouryoumaru realizes that it came from Kagura and tells her to bring him Kohaku's shard or be absorbed herself. Hakudōshi seeks the shard as part of the plot to replace Naraku with Mouryoumaru. Kagura lends a flying plume to Kohaku so he can escape.
38	A Heart in the Hand	December 10, 2004; 4-09-126668-1	July 14, 2009; 978-1-4215-2220-3
369. Hakudoshi's Scheme (白童子の真意, "Hakudōshi no Shin'i"); 370. Hakudoshi's End (白童子の最期, "Hakudōshi no Saigo"); 371. Kagura's Heart (神楽の心臓, "Kagura no Shinzō"); 372. Pain Without End (終わらない苦しみ, "Owaranai Kurushimi"); 373. Siblings (姉弟, "Kyōdai"); 374. The Wind (風, "Kaze"); 375. The Hole in Her Chest (胸の穴, "Mune no Ana"); 376. The Same Soul (同じ魂, "Onaji Tamashii"); 377. Destinies (使命, "Shimei"); 378. The Snake's Lair (大蛇の巣, "Orochi no Su")
After Naraku commands his Saimyosho to retreat and disables the barrier, Miroku kills Hakudoshi with his wind tunnel. Kagura tells Inuyasha and his group about the location of Naraku's heart, which is inside Moryomaru. Naraku returns Kagura's heart and wounds the latter. Meanwhile, Sango goes after Kohaku but finds Moryomaru instead. Kohaku oversees this battle and joins in. Inuyasha, Miroku, and Kagome arrive and Moryomaru retreats. Sango then figures out that Kohaku has his memories back, as Kohaku escapes as well. Kagura dies at the flower meadow, stating that she is free. While Inuyasha and the group rest, Kikyo takes the priestess Midoriko's soul. Inuyasha confronts her and she states that Naraku can only be defeated by the Shikon Jewel itself. Kohaku leaves with Kikyo, determined to stop Naraku.
39	The Struggle Continues	February 18, 2005; 4-09-126669-X	August 11, 2009; 978-1-4215-2221-0
379. Sudden Change (かけらの異変, "Kakera no Ihen"); 380. The Burial Ground of the Wolves (狼の墓場, "Ookami no Hakaba"); 381. The Guardian of the Treasure (宝の守り役, "Takara no Mamoriyaku"); 382. The Claws (五雷指, "Goraishi"); 383. Mujina (ムジナ, "Mujina"); 384. Just Causes (大義, "Taigi"); 385. Trickery (奪鬼, "Dakki"); 386. Toshu (刀秋, "Tōshū"); 387. Ryujin's Shield (竜人の盾, "Ryūjin no Tate"); 388. The Wielder of Dakki (奪鬼の使い手, "Dakki no Tsukaite")
Koga comes in contact with the arm of Moryomaru that had killed the entire snake demon clan. Inuyasha, Kagome, Miroku, Sango and Shippo, arrive in time to help Koga, but the arm retreats. Koga decides to retrieve a weapon in the sacred burial grounds of the wolf demon clan. But, a three headed stone wolf attacks Koga. The stone wolf forces Koga to save his comrades or retrieving the weapon. But, in that act of courage the spirits of the wolf demon clan give him the Goraishi, a claw like weapon that can produce lighting. The spirits also said that they can protect Koga from the will that taints the shards in his legs only once. Later, Shippo comes in contact with a girl named Mujina who wields a blade that can absorb demon energy. Inuyasha's demonic energy is stolen only to be returned after he defeats Mujina. Mujina really turns out to be a tanuki disguised as a human. Inuyasha and the group find a man named Toshu who is being hunted by a demon named Ryujin. Ryujin eventually attacks Inuyasha in hopes of taking back a sword called Dakki that was made from one of his scales. Inuyasha easily defeats Ryujin, only to be surprised when Toshu stabs Dakki into Ryujin and it absorbs his demon energy.
40	The Fate of a Sword	May 18, 2005; 4-09-126670-3	September 8, 2009; 978-1-4215-2890-8
389. Crack (亀裂, Kiretsu); 390. Resignation (覚悟, Kakugo); 391. One Mind, One Body (一心同体, Isshindōtai); 392. A Peaceful Meal (平和な食卓, Heiwana Shokutaku); 393. The Nunnery (尼寺, Amadera); 394. Cat Demon (化け猫, "Bake Neko"); 395. The Dragon-Scaled Tetsusaiga (竜鱗の鉄砕牙, "Ryūrin no Tessaiga"); 396. Venomous Mizuchi (毒蛟, "Doku Mizuchi"); 397. Byakuya of the Dreams (夢幻の白夜, "Mugen no Byakuya"); 398. Tetsusaiga Released (鉄砕牙の暴発, "Tessaiga no Bōhatsu")
Toshu recounts his meeting with Ryujin and his request to make a Dakki. The power of Tessaiga is absorbed by Dakki and Tessaiga begins to crack. Tessaiga, almost at its limit, creates a barrier of wind to avoid breaking. Inuyasha uses the Bakuryuha on Toshu, but the attack is absorbed by Dakki. Tessaiga seemingly reverts to its katana state permanently. Inuyasha makes a chip in Dakki, and he destroys Toshu in order to stay whole. Tessaiga reclaims its demonic power, restoring it to its former glory, and also claims the power of Dakki, creating the Dragon-Scaled Tessaiga. Miroku tries to trick Sango by having Shippō imitate him but Sango finds out and beats him over the head. Kagome prepares a meal in the modern era for Inuyasha, but Inuyasha inadvertently damages the house. Inuyasha and group take refuge at a supposedly haunted temple. In the temple, the group meets a lone human nun, and is also attacked by cat demons disguised as nuns. Inuyasha and Miroku discover the bones of a large cat demon and then it comes to life. The Nun reveals that she is actually a cat demon in disguise. She traps Kagome, intending on eating her, while Miroku, Sango and Inuyasha are busy battling the other cat-demons. The Cat Demon revealed it took control a nun and used the human's body to lure villagers to their deaths Inuyasha uses his Dragon-scaled Tessaiga to defeat the cat demon and free the possessed nun. Inuyasha fights a venomous demon named Mizuchi, who absorbed a piece of Mōryōmaru's flesh. Byakuya watches the fight and sees when Inuyasha fails to use his Dragon-scaled Tessaiga. Naraku's latest incarnation Byakuya used his illusion to transform four Mizuchis. Shippō warns Inuyasha about fighting illusion. Dragon-Scaled Tessaiga absorbs a lot of Mizuchi's poison to become darker. Inuyasha manages to kill Mizuchi cutting it in two, but the rejection of yoki invests him.
