= Espantoon =

Wooden baton associated with Baltimore policing

The espantoon (/ɛsˈpən.tuːn/ es-PƏN-tewn) is an ornate straight wooden baton, equipped with a long swiveled leather strap for twirling. It originated in, and is still strongly associated with, the Baltimore Police Department, the police department of the city of Baltimore, Maryland, United States. The term is considered distinctly Baltimorean.

The word itself derives from that of the spontoon, a polearm carried by British Army infantry officers during the Revolutionary period. The espantoon has been considered a symbol of the "policeman's office and dignity". Before the advent of police radio, the espantoon was reportedly used by Baltimore policemen to call for assistance, where its user would bang it on the curb or a drainpipe.

In 1994, Thomas C. Frazier took over as Baltimore's police commissioner and banned the espantoon. Frazier, a Californian, believed that the device, and the policemen's twirling of it, was intimidating to the civilian populace. He attempted to replace it with another weapon, the koga baton, much longer at 29 in (74 cm) without a strap or handle. Many officers, however, felt that the koga was cumbersome, difficult to master, and even more dangerous than the espantoon.

In 2000, Edward T. Norris assumed the office of police commissioner and lifted the ban on the espantoon, although he did not mandate its use. The move was made as part of a general effort to boost morale and instill a more aggressive approach to policing in Baltimore. Norris stated, "When I found out what they meant to the rank and file, I said, 'Bring them back.' ... It is a tremendous part of the history of this Police Department."
