= Swordstaff =

Medieval Scandinavian pole weapon

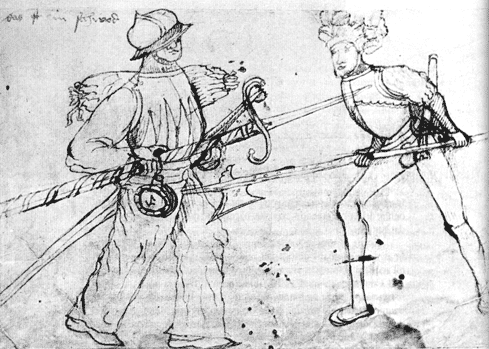
Paul Dolnstein's sketch of a Swedish militiaman (left) using a swordstaff in combat with a landsknecht (right).

A swordstaff (Old Danish: sværdstaf), or staffsword (Old Danish: stavsværd, Old Swedish: stafsværdh, (Note: Also spelled: staffswærdh, staffswerdh) Middle Low German: stafswert), is a Medieval polearm mentioned in Nordic sources and sources pertaining to Scandinavia. It is a figurative term, referencing a spear, or similar, utilizing a sword- or dagger-like blade and crossguard. Archeological finds have been done in Sweden.

== Period description ==
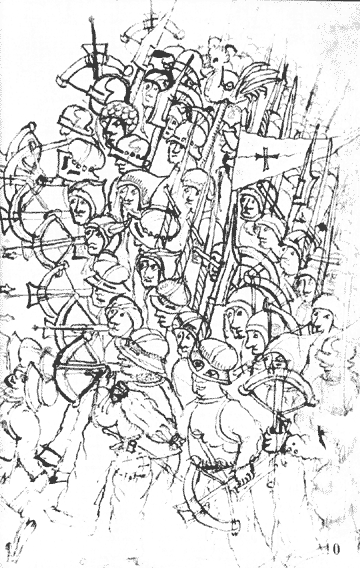
Sketch by landsknecht mercenary Paul Dolstein of Swedish army (c. 1502), back row wielding swordstaffs (with crossguards)

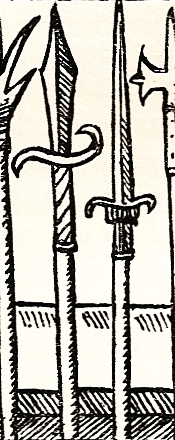
Swordstaffs depicted in A Description of the Northern Peoples (1555)

Evidence of the weapon in use at the battle of Elfsborg (Alvesborg) in 1502 is provided by Paul Dolnstein, a landsknecht mercenary that fought in the battle, who refers to the Swedes carrying "good pikes made from swords". He also provides sketches of the weapon.

Period Swedish texts mention swordstaffs separately along with other polearms, such as halberds, poleaxes, partisans, spears, and thereof. A period text, from c. 1502, uses the term brander (compare Old Norse: brandr), an older term for swordblade, to describe the blades of swordstaffs:

Jagh haffuer tinget vj ny brande till staffswerdh, och jag haffuer ingen penning ath betala them med, eren i wiid penninge, gören wel och sender hiid nogre, her staar ey peningha til fongx paa pant.

Translation:

I have negotiated VI (six) new blades for staffswords, and i have no money to pay for them. Are you with money, do well and send here some. Here stand no money to catch for pawn.

In Variarum rerum vocabula cum sueca interpretatione (1538), Sweden's oldest dictionary, Latin: venabulum, a type of hunting spear, is translated as both "swine spit/skewer" (swijn spett), and "staff sword" (staff swärdh).

== Archeological finds ==
A swordstaff blade has been found at the Husaby castle ruin in Västergötland, Sweden. The blade has a smith's mark similar to the Passau Wolf mark. With the original wooden shaft, the full length of the weapon was approximately two metres long.

== Origins ==
The weapon has visual similarities to the partisan and ox tongue spear and may share common origins. However, Scandinavian sagas make references to a number of pole weapons, usually translated as "halberd" or "bill". These weapons are used to cut and to stab, but their names suggest they were derived from the spear rather than a cutting weapon, such as the hewing spear (hǫggspjót) and the atgeir. While clearly identifiable artistic or archaeological evidence of the form of these weapons is lacking, it is possible that the swordstaff may be a late derivative of this family of weapons.

=== Other languages ===
Various other languages have analog terms which might have referred to similar or the same type of weapon.

- Middle Dutch: stafswert – dagger
- Middle Low German: stafswert – swordstaff, hunting spear, dagger
- Old English: stæfsweord – sword cane
  - Middle English: staffsword – sword cane
- Old High German: stapaswert – throwing spear
  - Middle High German: stapswert – dagger, sword cane
- Old Norse: hǫggspjót – hewing spear

In Russia, a similar weapon, called rogátina (Russian: рога́тина), a heavy daggerbladed spear for hand-to-hand combat and hunting large animals (compare sovnya), featured in later forms a full crossguard and sword length blade.

== Chinese swordstaff ==
Chinese polearms that resembled swordstaves were also often used in ancient China from the late Warring States/Qin dynasty to the Han dynasty era. These were known as the pi (鈹), translated into English as either "sword-staff" or "long lance", and a long bladed ranseur-like swordstaff weapon called the sha (鎩) with a blade that was about 62 cm (24 in) long (up to 80 cm (31 in) long) and a hilt that was about 19 cm (7.5 in) long.

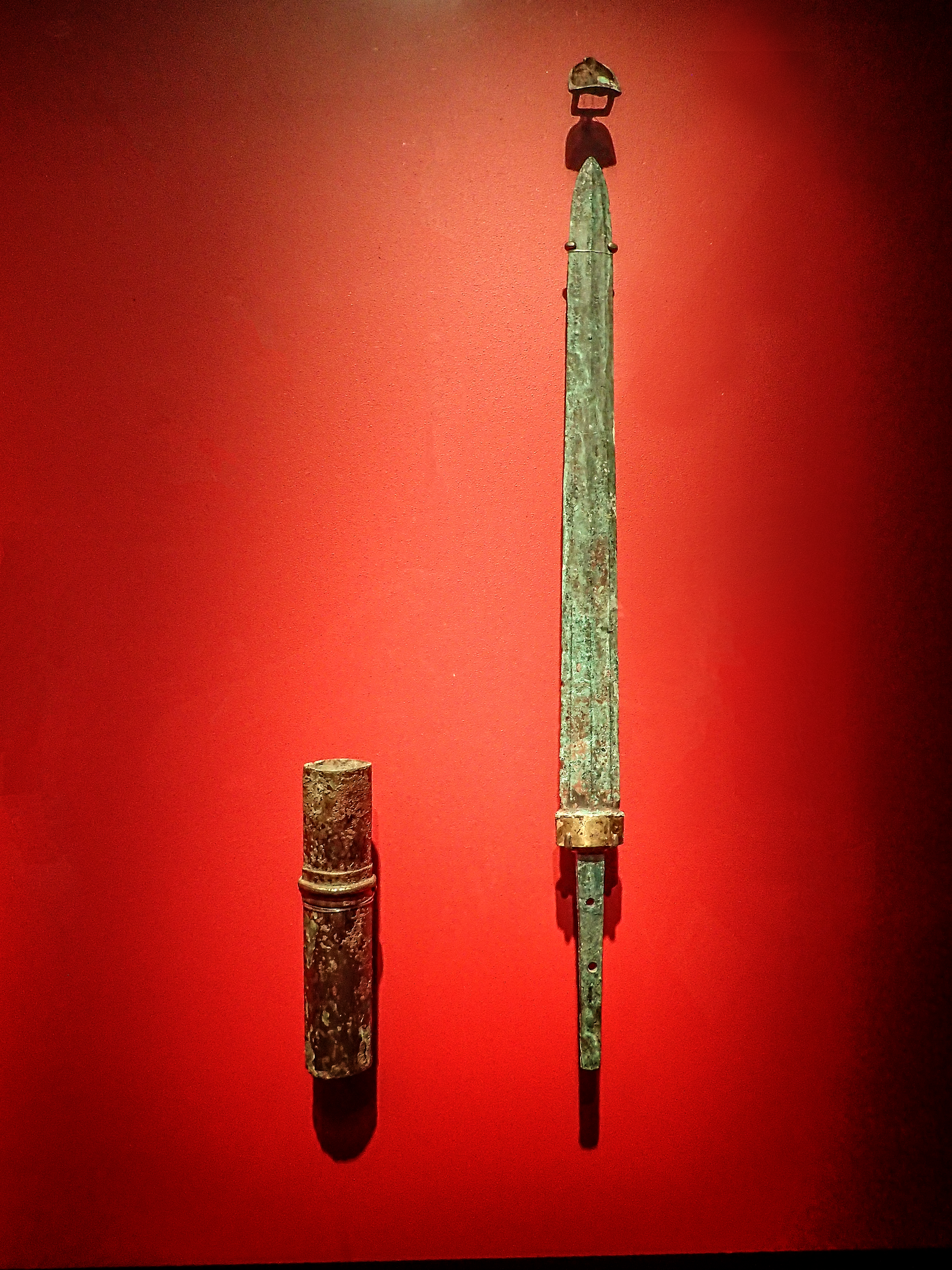
Chinese swordstaff called a pi (鈹), Han dynasty

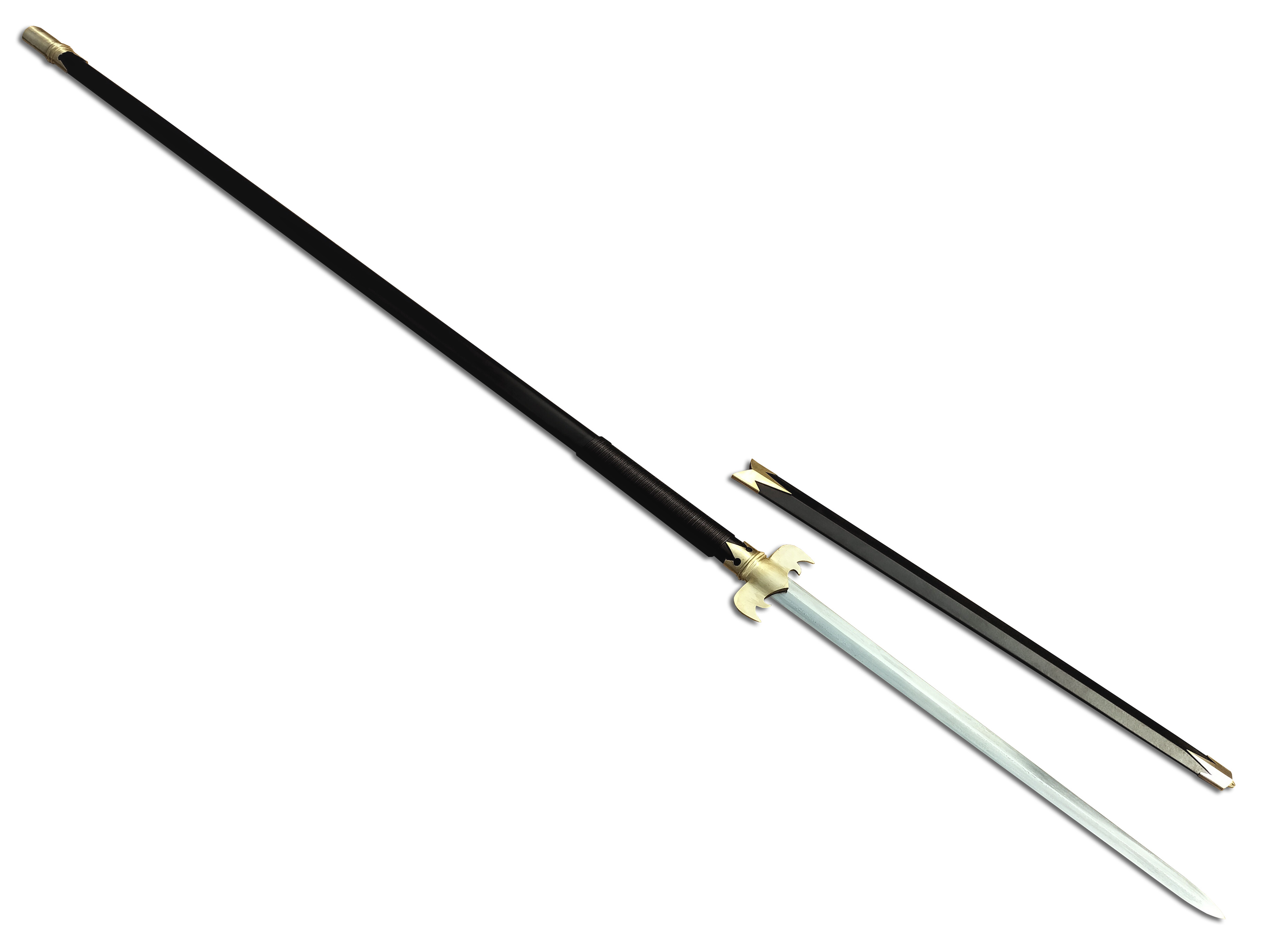
Han dynasty Sha 铩 with bat shaped guard and scabbard

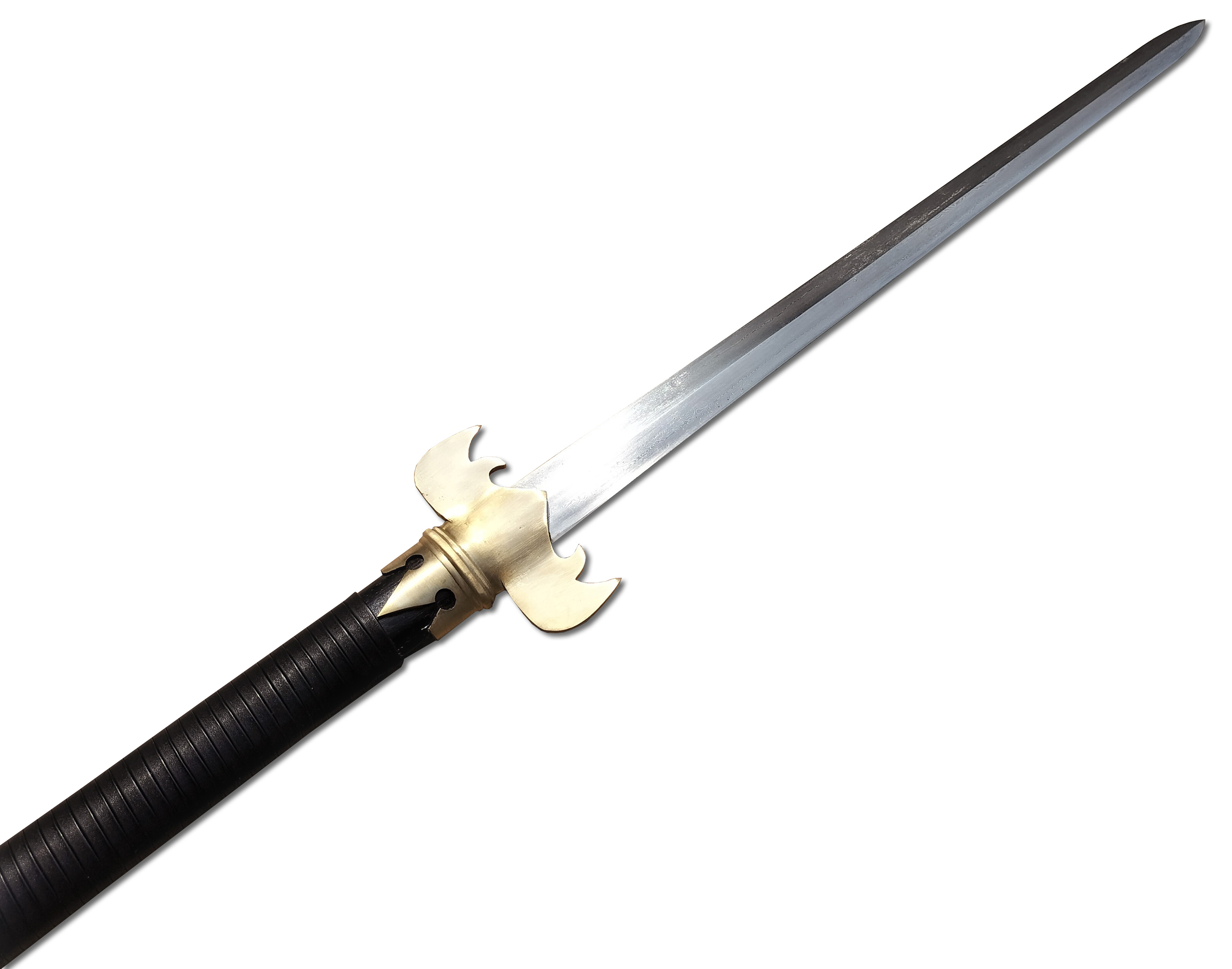
Closeup of a modern recreation of the sha with a bat shaped guard

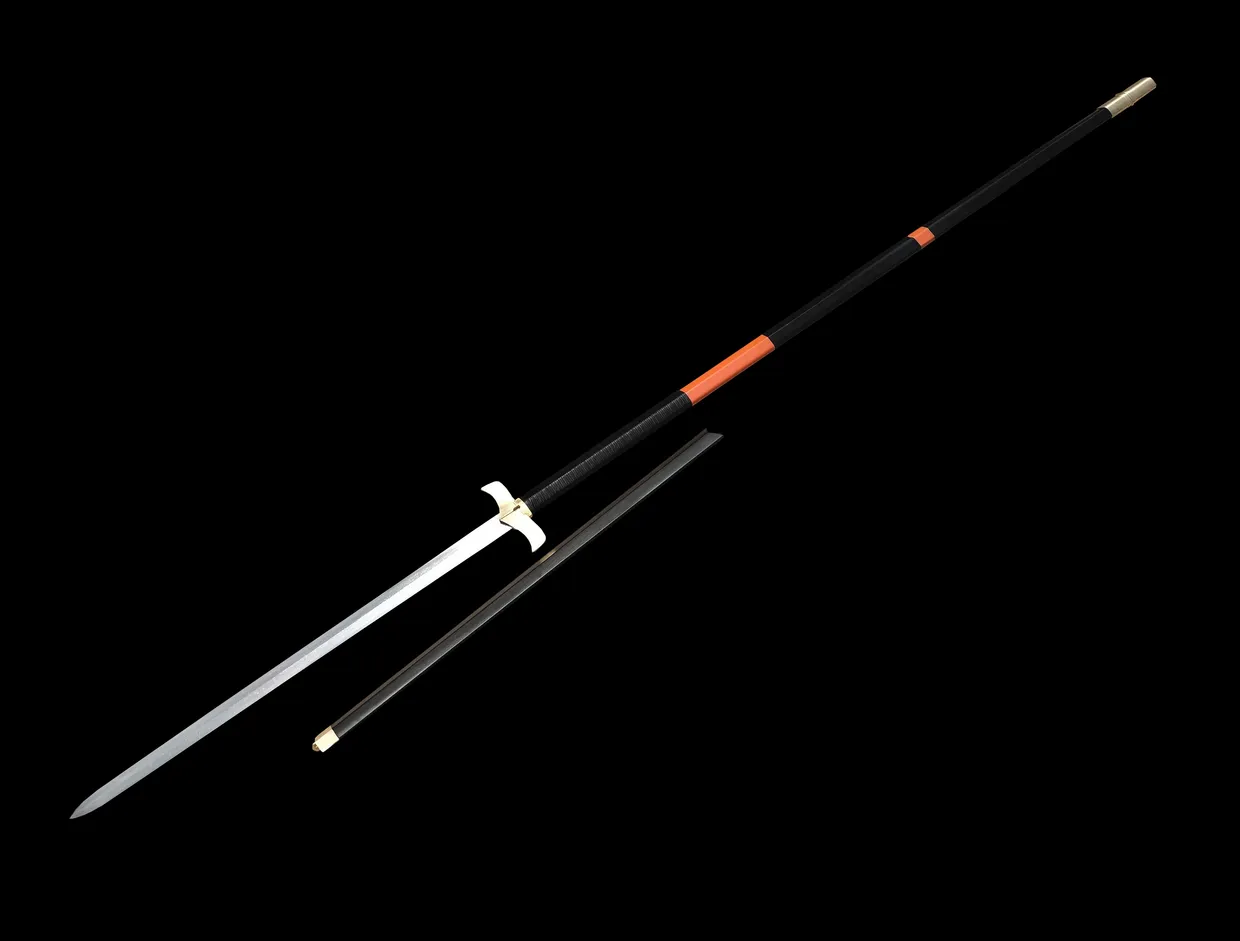
Han dynasty sha (swordstaff), modern recreation of the classic version of the swordstaff "sha" from the Han dynasty era

== See also ==
- Glave
- Guandao
- Guisarme
- Fauchard
- Naginata
- Partisan (weapon)
- Sovnya
- Spontoon
- Viking halberd
