= Brandistock =

Type of polearm

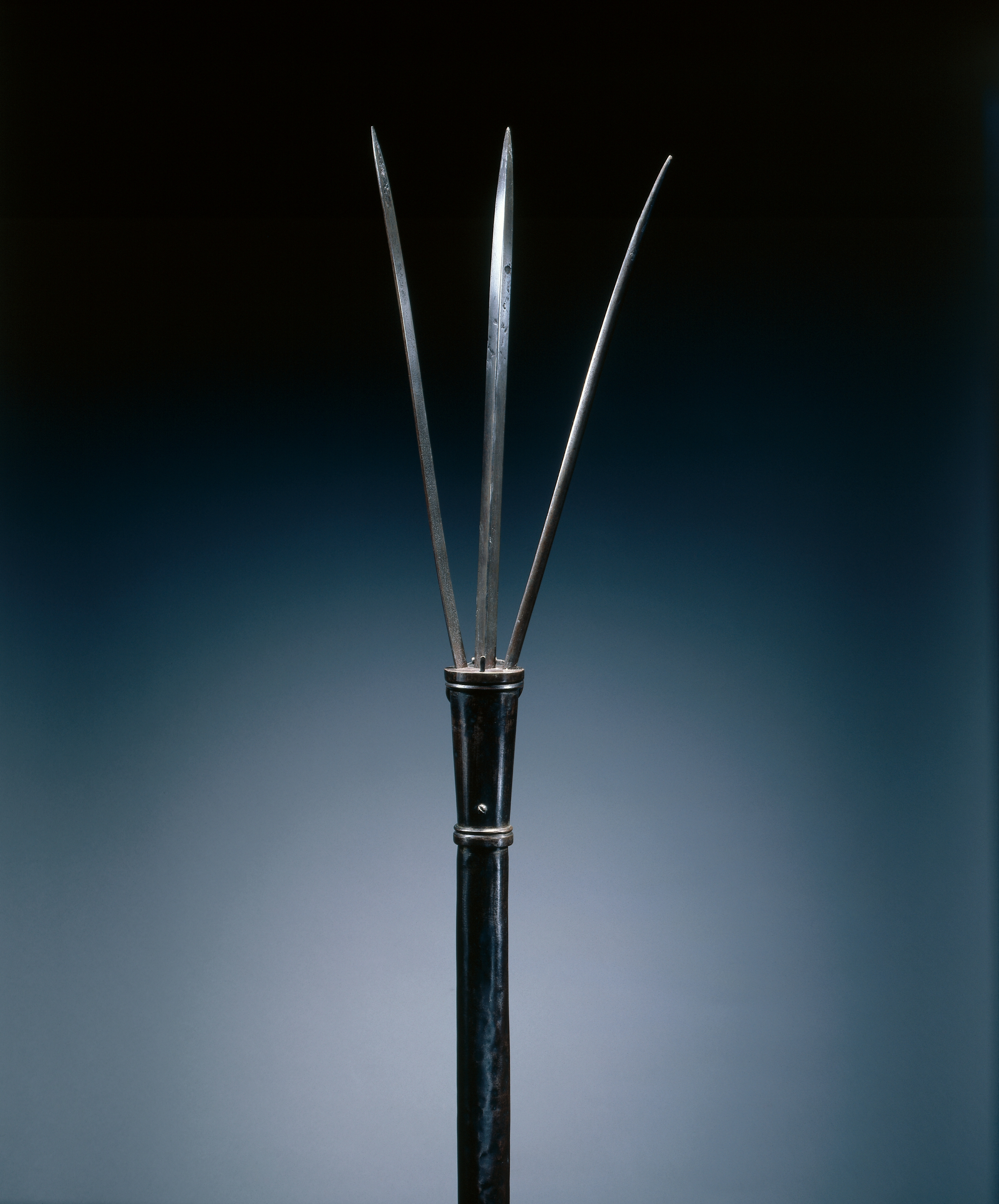
Brandistock with retractable blades. Early 17th century, Italy

A brandistock (also called brandestoc, buttafuori or feather staff) was a short type of polearm which was used by both infantry and civilians alike, primarily police officers in Italy between the 16th and 19th centuries. Measuring some 1.5 meters (5 ft) long, the brandistock construction was unique for polearms in that it had a retractable blade; the weapon was able to be covertly carried as a walking staff. The head consisted of either a single or a trio of long thin points, which were kept in a hollow aperture inside the rest of the shaft. The blades would often be triangular or diamond-shaped. A sharp thrust of the weapon forward propelled the heads out, where they could be readily locked in place. This weapon is essentially a spear with a sliding blade, or alternatively, a long handled out-the-front gravity knife.
