= Welsh hook =

Medieval Welsh pole weapon

A Welsh hook is a type of polearm, a halberd-like weapon with a hook on the back, and gained its name due to its prevalence among the Welsh soldiers during the medieval wars against the English. It closely related to the agricultural implement known as a bill and is commonly classified as a type of poleaxe.

== In literature ==
- "That no man presume to wear any weapons, especially Welsh-hooks and forest-bills" ("The History of Sir John Oldcastle", Folio 3, 1664, 60).
- Falstaff: "My own knee? ... and swore the devil his true liegeman upon the cross of a Welsh hook,—What, a plague, call you him?" (Shakespeare Henry IV Part 1, 290).
