= Nagamaki =

Type of Japanese sword with an extra long handle

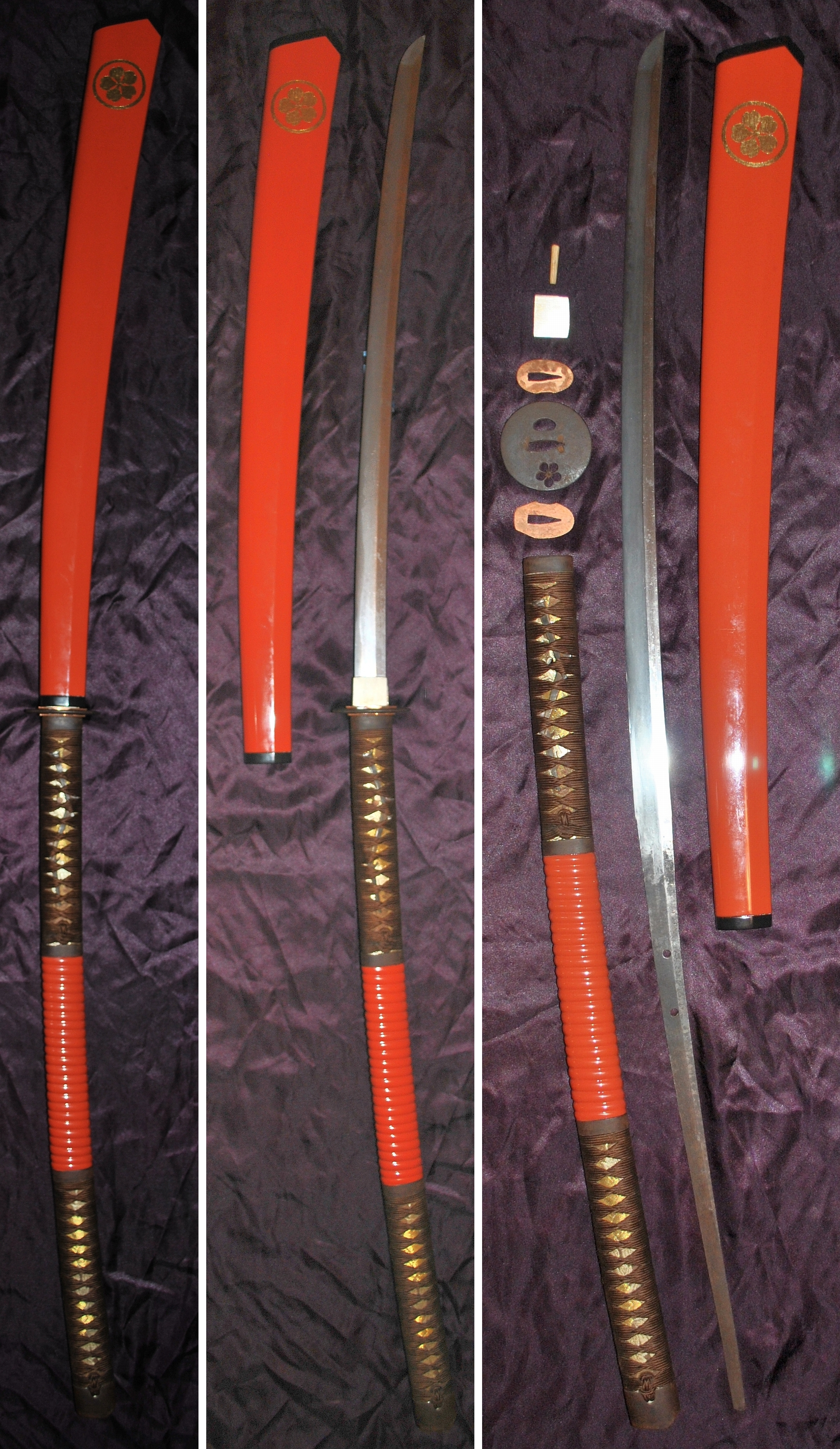
Nagamaki, 135 cm (53 in) koshirae, 130 cm (51 in) from tsuka to tip, 50 cm (20 in) tang, 68 cm (27 in) tsuka, 60 cm (24 in) cutting edge

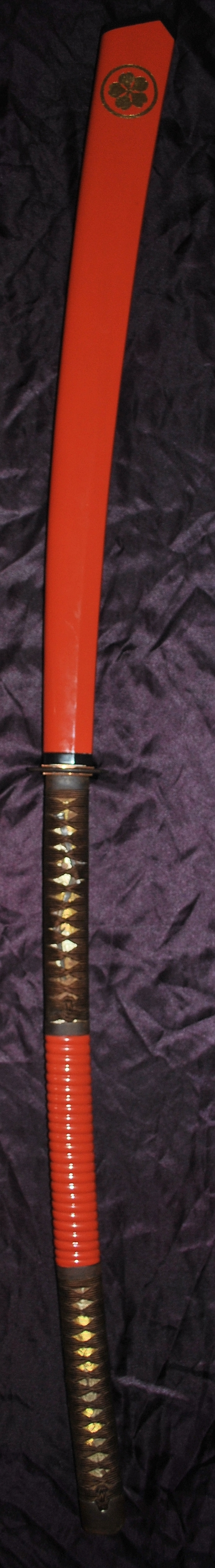
Nagamaki koshirae, 54 in.

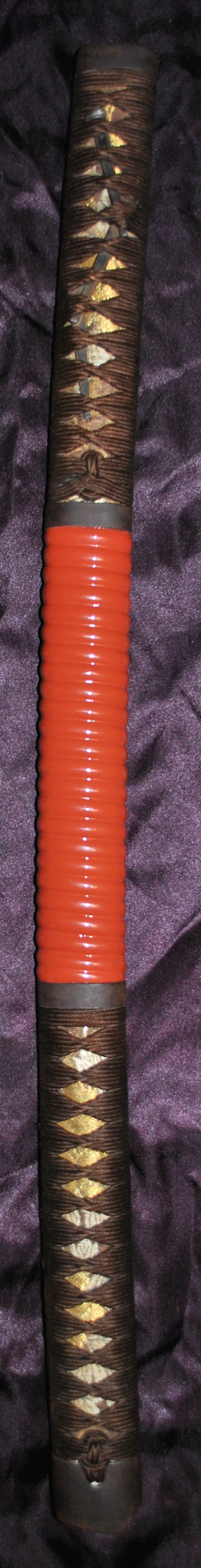
Nagamaki hilt, 26.75 in.

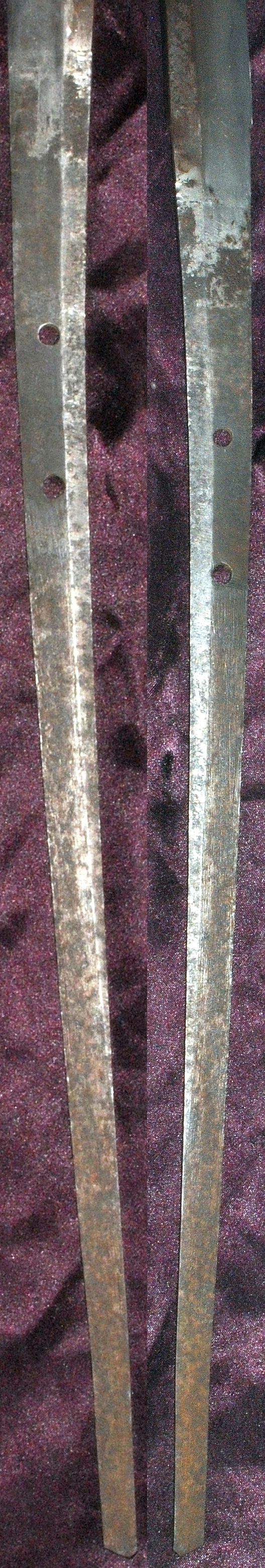
Shinto nagamaki tang, 19.75 in.

The nagamaki (長巻; "long wrapping") is a type of traditionally made Japanese sword (nihontō) with an extra long handle, used by the samurai class of feudal Japan.

== History ==
It is possible that nagamaki were first produced during the Heian period (794 to 1185), but there are no known examples dating from before the mid Kamakura period (1192–1333). The nagamaki is believed to have been developed from the ōdachi (great sword). The ōdachi, with its long blade, was sometimes too long to be used with a standard length hilt. Therefore, a strong cord would sometimes be wrapped around the sword from the center of the blade to the tsuba (sword guard), and the user would hold the sword by that part of the cord. The sword used in this way was called nakamaki no tachi (中巻の太刀, sword with middle wrapping). It is believed that this usage evolved into the nagamaki, in which the hilt was lengthened during the manufacturing process.

In the Sengoku period, as the battlefield changed to a tactic where foot soldiers called ashigaru (足軽) fought on a large scale in dense formations with tanegashima (gun) and yari (spear), naginata (pole weapon), which were difficult to use in dense formations, were replaced by nagamaki, and heavy and long tachi (long sword) were often replaced by katana.

During the Sengoku period, the nagamaki reached its peak of usage. It was generally used as a weapon for low-ranking soldiers who fought on foot. The historical book Kenbun zatsuroku (見聞雑録) mentions that nagamaki were lent to low-ranking soldiers who could not handle the yari well. The famed warlord Uesugi Kenshin, daimyō (feudal lord) of Echigo Province, is said to have had a special guard of retainers armed with nagamaki.

In the Edo period (1603–1867), the hilts of nagamaki were often cut off and made into katana or wakizashi (short sword). This practice of cutting off the hilt of a ōdachi or tachi or naginata or nagamaki and remaking it into a shorter katana or wakizashi due to changes in tactics is called suriage (磨上げ) and was common in Japan at the time.

In Japan, there is a saying about swords: "No sword made by modifying a nagamaki or a naginata is dull in cutting" (長巻（薙刀）直しに鈍刀なし). The meaning of this saying is nagamaki and naginata are equipment for combat, not works of art or offerings to the kami, and that the sharpness and durability of swords made from their modifications have been proven on the battlefield.

== Description ==
The nagamaki was a long sword with a blade that could be 60 cm (24 in) or more and a handle of about equal length to the blade. The blade was single-edged, resembling a naginata blade, but the handle (tsuka) of the nagamaki was not a smooth-surfaced wooden shaft as in the naginata; it was made more like a katana hilt. Even the name "nagamaki" ("long wrapping") is given by the tradition of handle wrapping. The nagamaki's handle was wrapped with leather or silk cords in criss-crossed manner, very similar to that of a katana's. The nagamaki is considered to be evolved from the extremely long ōdachi or nodachi swords that are described in fourteenth century literature and pictorial sources.

The length of blade varies on a nagamaki. However, the nagasa (blade length) most commonly fits the profile of a tachi or katana blade, which would be a blade of more than 2 shaku (2 Shaku = 60 cm (24 in)) in length. While nagamaki means "long wrap", there have been specimens found with no wrapping cord at all, which is very similar to a long tachi handle. The tsukamaki (hilt wrap) is of even more importance when applied to the hilt. The cord helps to improve grip on the hilt and also lends structural integrity to the wooden handle. Nagamaki found without hilt wraps usually had at least metal collars around the hilt where the tang is.

There are no solid rules governing the aspects of the make of the nagamaki. Unlike the wakizashi, tantō, and katana, which have a history of strict measurements regarding the blade length and even the hilt in some cases, the nagamaki varied in blade length, tang length, kissaki style, and so on. Nagamaki presumably could have koshirae in a tachi or katana style as well as a nagamaki style, however there are examples of nagamaki with rather long tangs, which could be fitted with a longer haft and effectively function as a naginata. Araki-ryū nagamaki is a heavy naginata over 3.5 kg (7.7 lb) in weight and 240 cm (94 in) in length.

All traditional Japanese swords are fitted snugly to their hilts and held in place with a mekugi, a bamboo peg which is fit through a hole in the tang called a mekugi-ana. This is a very strong mount when done correctly, and allowed for easy dismount of the bare blade for maintenance or inspection. Katanas most commonly had one single pin, and nagamaki commonly have been found with two or more to account for the added leverage of a longer handle.

== Use ==
Wielding is very specific; it is held with two hands in a fixed position in the same way a katana is held. Unlike the naginata, the hands do not change when handling the weapon and the right hand was always the closest to the blade. While handling nagamaki, fewer sliding actions on the handle are performed than the naginata, where the entire length of the shaft is used. The nagamaki is designed for large sweeping and slicing strokes. The nagamaki was typically used as an infantry weapon, often against cavalry.

== In fiction ==
- Tatsugiri, signature nagamaki wields by Kuryuu Ango in 2000s Gamaran manga.
- Sir Alonne, a boss encountered in the Dark Souls II DLC campaign Crown of the Old Iron King, is a samurai-like character who wields a nagamaki. He will commit seppuku with the nagamaki if the player defeats him without taking damage.
- Lyon, a supporting character in the fifth Suikoden game, wields a nagamaki to protect her charge, the Prince of Falena, who is the protagonist.
- In The Lord of the Rings films The Fellowship of the Ring and The Two Towers, the Elves are shown using a curved, single-edged sword very similar to the nagamaki, except for a subtle S-shape.
- In the anime called Tensei Shitara Suraimu Datta Ken, the red-haired warrior Hiiro wields a nagamaki sword.
- Corrupted Monk, a boss encountered in the game Sekiro: Shadows Die Twice, wields a huge nagamaki and performs elaborate swipe and swing attacks on the player.
- In Samurai Shodown, newcomer Yashamaru Kurama wields a nagamaki. He is the only character in the series to wield one.
- In Heroes (American TV series) season 1 episode 22 “Landslide”, Ando buys a Nagamaki to kill Sylar.

== See also ==
- Japanese sword
- Naginata
- Podao
- Swordstaff
