= Spontoon =

Type of polearm

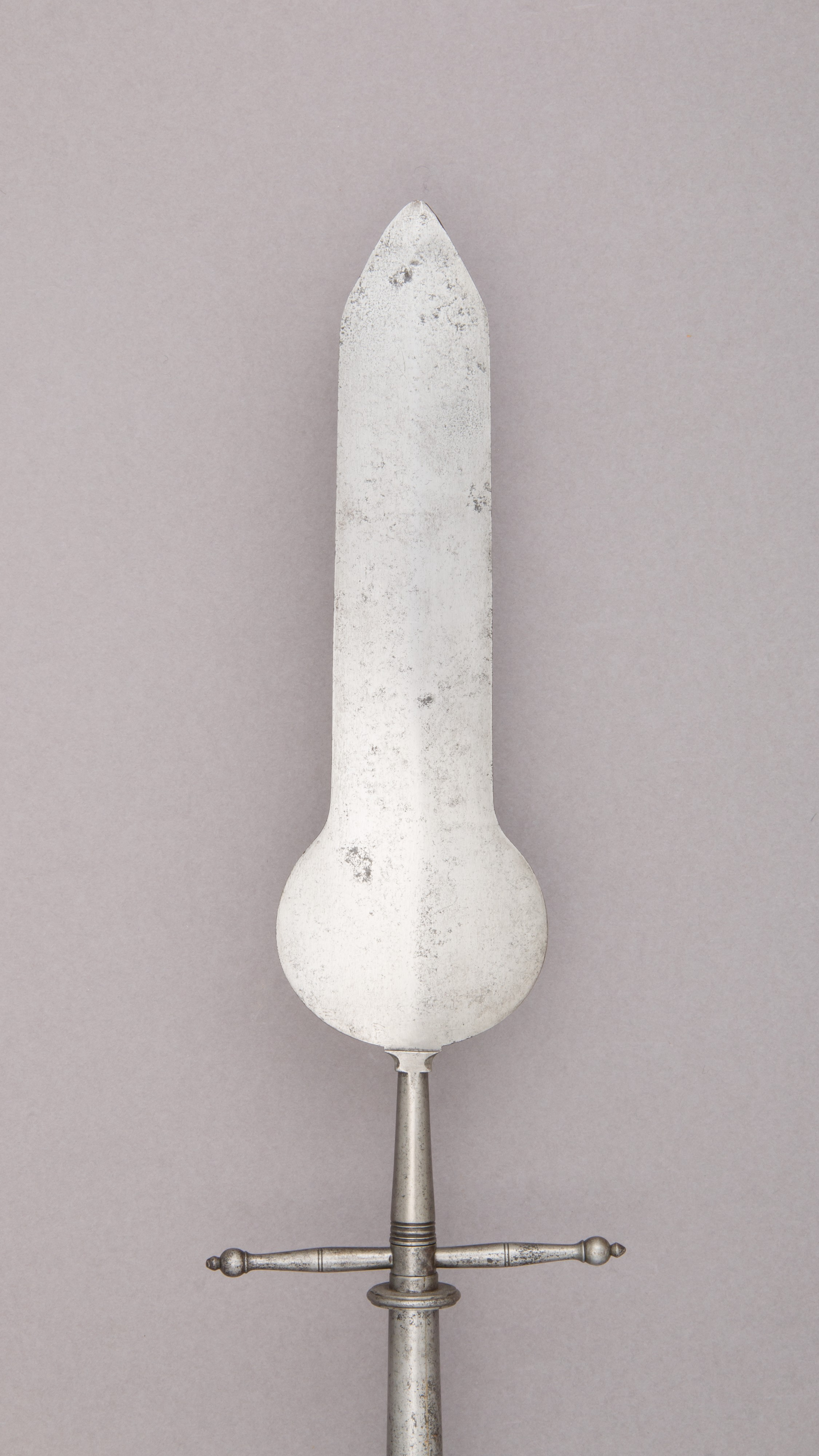
Spontoon, American, detail (MET, 42.140)

A spontoon, sometimes known by the variant spelling espontoon or as a half-pike, is a type of European polearm that came into being alongside the pike. The spontoon was in common use from the mid-17th century to the early 19th century, but it was used to a much lesser extent as a military weapon and ceremonial implement until the late 19th century.

== Description ==
Unlike the pike, which was a very long weapon that was typically 4.3–4.9 m (14–16 ft) long, the spontoon was much shorter and only measured around 1.8–2.4 m (5 ft 11 in – 7 ft 10 in) in overall length. Generally, this weapon featured a more elaborate head than the typical pike. The head of a spontoon often had a pair of blades or lugs on each side, giving the weapon the look of a military fork or a trident. There were also spontoon-style axes that used the same shaped blades mounted on the side of the weapon with a shorter haft.

Italians might have been the first to use the spontoon, and, in its early days, the weapon was used for combat, before it became more of a symbolic item.

After the bayonet and musket replaced the pike and arquebus as the primary weapons of the common foot soldier, the spontoon remained in use as a signalling weapon. In the British army, commissioned officers carried the spontoon until 1786 as a symbol of their rank and used it like a mace, in order to issue battlefield commands to their men, whilst sergeants generally carried the halberd until 1792 when it was replaced by the sergeant's pike, a spontoon. British Army officers used spontoons at the Battle of Culloden.

During the Napoleonic Wars, the spontoon was used by sergeants to defend the colours of a battalion or regiment from a cavalry attack. The spontoon was one of few polearms that stayed in use long enough to make it into American history. The American Militia Acts of 1792 specified that commissioned officers were to be armed with an espontoon. Lewis and Clark brought spontoons on their expedition with the Corps of Discovery. The weapons came in handy as backup arms when the Corps travelled through areas populated by large bears. The spontoon accompanied marching soldiers as late as the 1890s.

Today, a spontoon (or espontoon, as it is referred to in the manual of arms) is carried by the drum major of the U.S. Army's Fife and Drum Corps, a ceremonial unit of the 3rd US Infantry Regiment (The Old Guard).

== Cultural references ==
In the 1985 film Revolution, the character Sergeant Major Peasy (played by Donald Sutherland) leads British troops while wielding a spontoon during the Battle of Long Island in 1776. He not only uses it to direct the troops' movements, but also uses it as a weapon when engaging the Continental Army.

== See also ==
- Espantoon
- Halberd
- Partisan (weapon)
