= Sovnya =

Type of polearm weapon

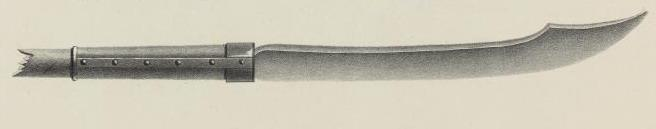
Head of a sovnya

A sovnya (Russian: совня) is a category of traditional polearms used in Russia. Similar to the glaive, the sovnya had a curved, single-edged blade mounted on the end of a long pole. The modern term refers to weapons used by late-medieval Muscovite cavalry and were retained in use until the mid-17th century.

The term was essentially coined in the 19th century by Russian soldier and military historian A. V. Viskovatov and the weapon was not referred to as such during its period of service. The only original use of the term was in the Novgorod First Chronicle, describing a pointed weapon of unclear design. Viskovatov's edition of the Chronicle translated the plural into Russian as sovi or sovni, where more reputable translations instead render it as сулицы, "darts", further distancing Viskovatov's terminology from historical reality.

== Gallery ==
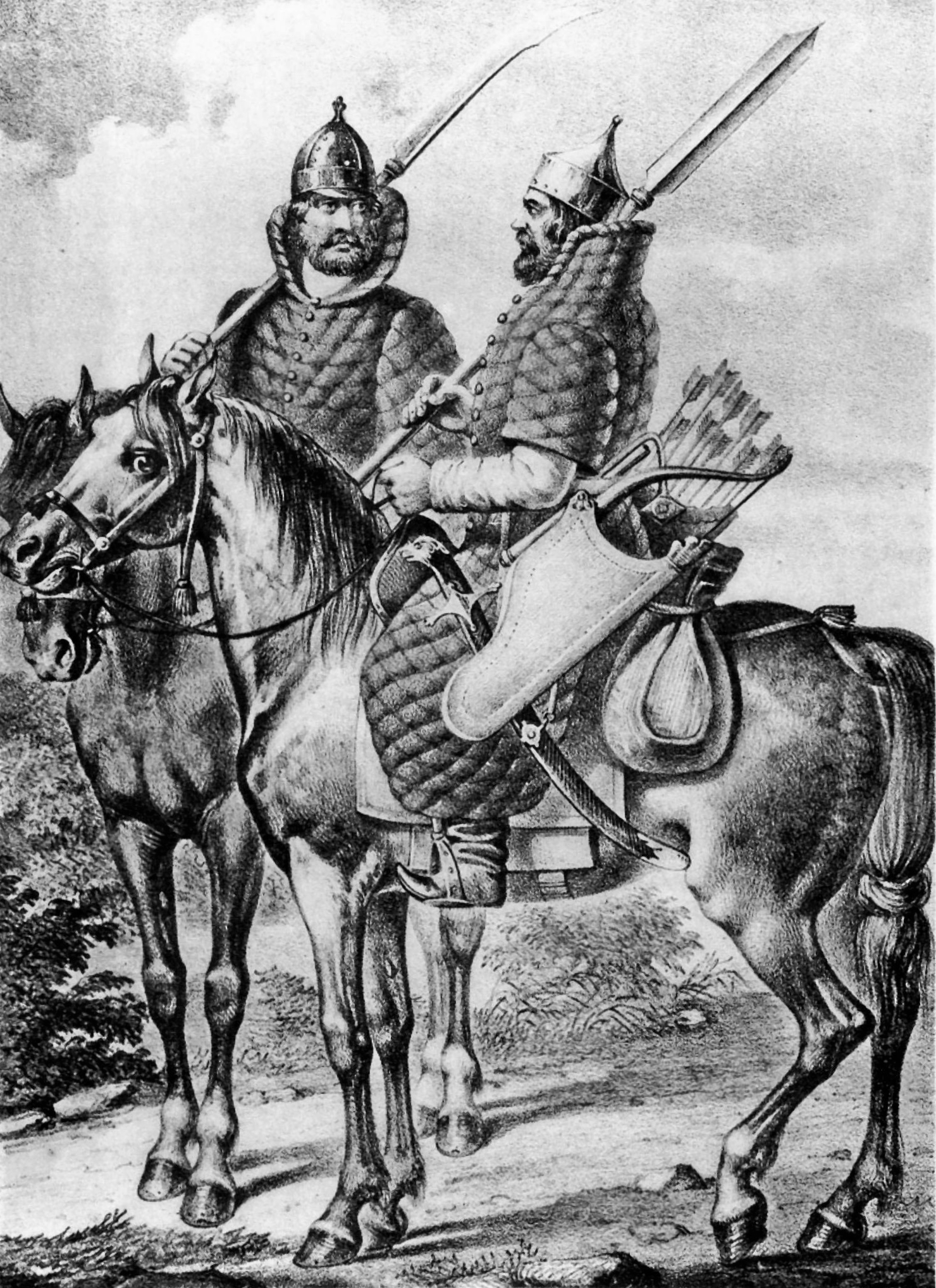

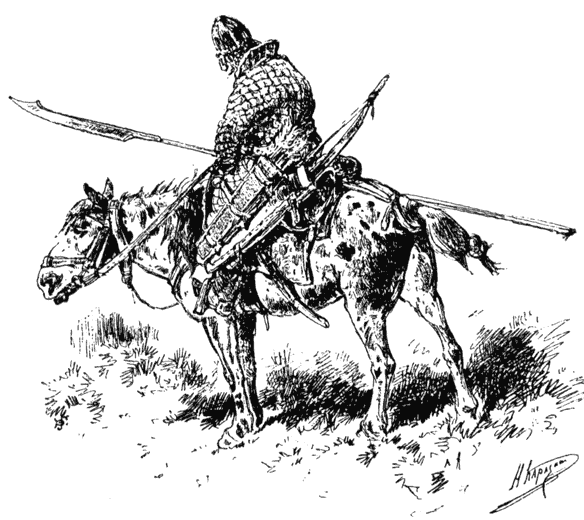

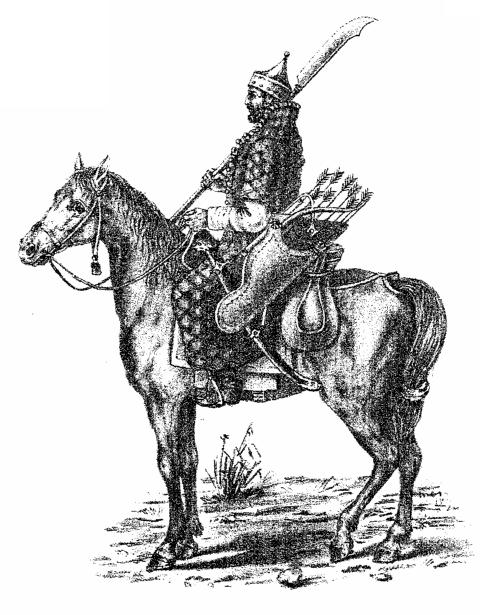

== See also ==
- Timeline of Russian innovation
