= Scottish polearms =

Overview of Scottish pole weapons

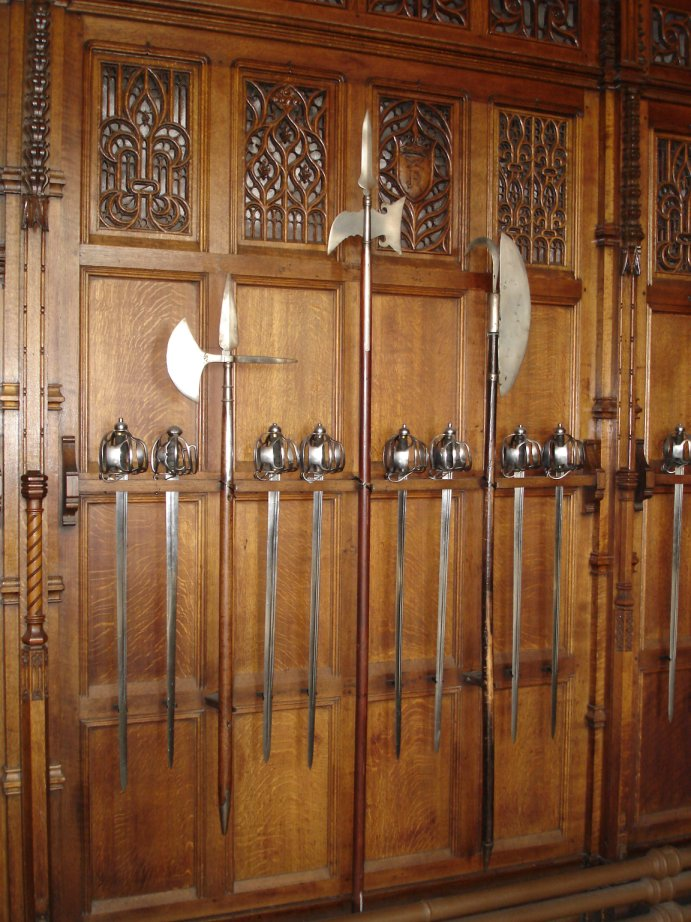
Polearms in the Great Hall of Edinburgh Castle. The polearm on the right is a Lochaber axe, in the centre a halberd.

Many of the polearms used in Scotland up to the beginning of the 16th century were similar to those used in other parts of the world; however, a number of distinct forms did evolve. The nomenclature of Scottish axes, in particular, is confusing, and the text below follows the classification scheme proposed by David H. Caldwell in his 1980 paper "Some Notes on Scottish Axes and Long Shafted Weapons".

== Brogit staff ==
The name means literally "spiked staff". This polearm is recorded in a Scottish law listing types of weapon in 1430 and is mentioned on other occasions in the 15th and early 16th centuries. Though clearly a pole weapon, its exact form is obscure. David H. Caldwell suggests it may have been similar to a Holy Water Sprinkler.

== Jeddart staff ==
The Jeddart staff (also Jedburgh or Jedwart) is a polearm of the 16th and 17th centuries with a glaive-like blade which is fixed to its haft by two sockets, in the manner of a bardiche. Form D in the Caldwell classification.

== Lochaber axe ==
The Lochaber axe is a simple axe with a broad curved blade usually attached to its long haft at two points. On the back of the blade is a simple hook. This type of axe is first recorded in 1501 and was used until the 18th. century. Form E in the Caldwell classification.

== Scottish halberd ==
The Scottish halberd is thought to have derived from the continental halberd probably in the late 16th century though it shares features with the pollaxe of the century before. They continued to be used into the 18th century. It has a spear-shaped point, small axe-blade and a back-spike, often curved. They were often carried by town officials and town guards. Form B in the Caldwell classification.
