= Halberd =

Type of polearm with axe blade topped with a spike

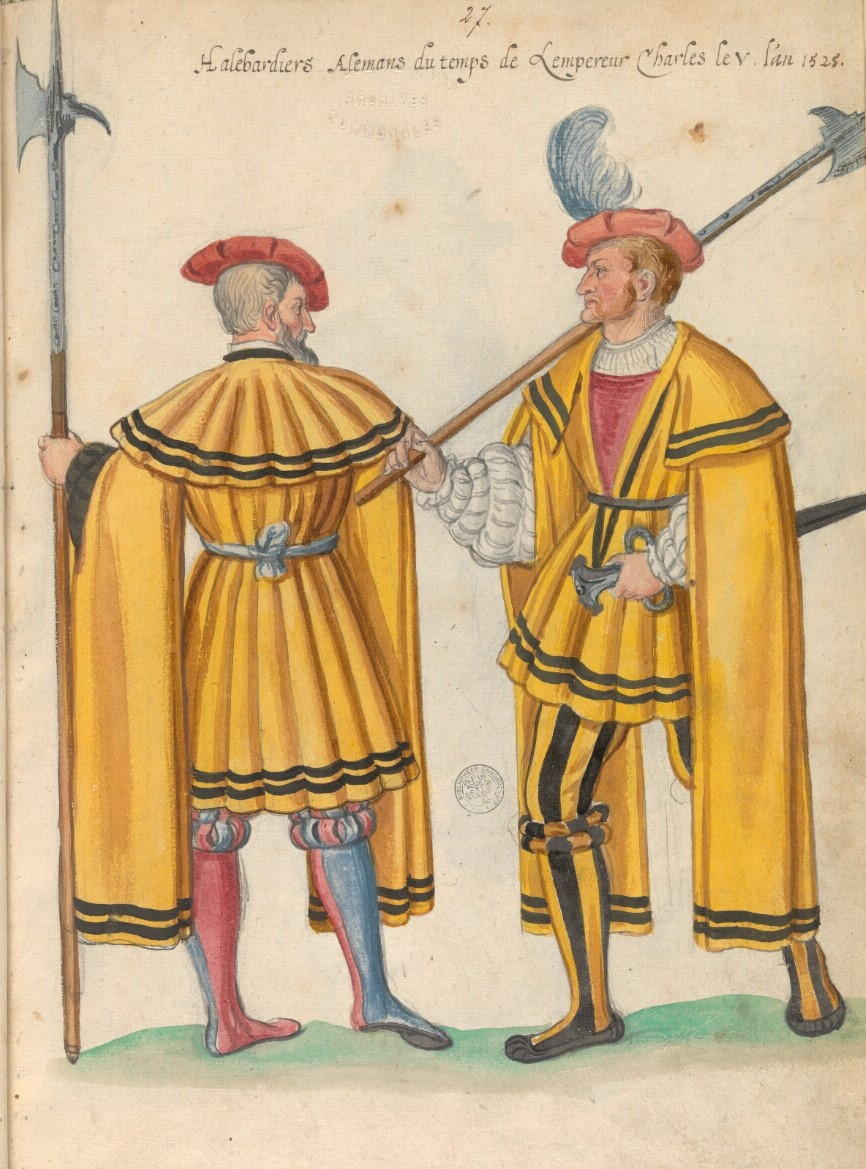
Halberd illustrated in "Théâtre de tous les peuples et nations de la terre avec leurs habits et ornemens divers, tant anciens que modernes, diligemment depeints au naturel". Painted by Lucas d'Heere in the second half of the 16th century. Manuscript preserved in the Ghent University Library

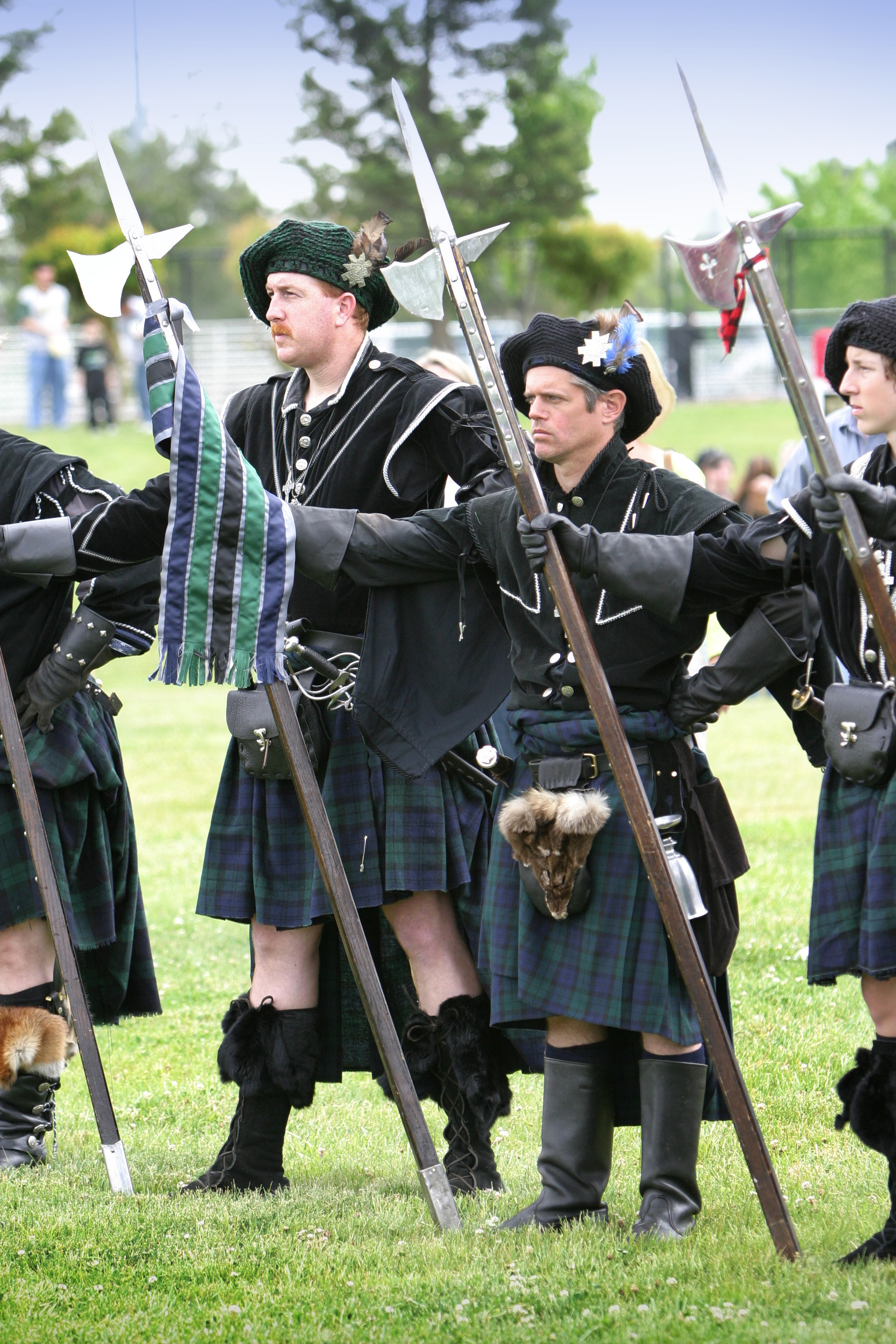
Halberdiers from a modern-day reenactor troupe

A halberd (also called halbard or halbert) is a two-handed polearm that was in prominent use in Europe from the 13th to 16th centuries. The halberd consists of an axe blade topped with a spike mounted on a long shaft. It may have a hook or thorn on the back of the axe blade for grappling mounted combatants and protecting allied soldiers, typically musketeers. The halberd was usually 6.6 to 8.2ft, or 2.0 to 2.5 metres, long.

The word halberd is cognate with the German word Hellebarde, deriving from Middle High German halm (handle) and barte (battleaxe) joined to form helmbarte. Troops that used the weapon were called halberdiers or halbardiers. The word has also been used to describe a weapon of the early Bronze Age in Western Europe. This consisted of a blade mounted on a pole at a right angle.

== History ==
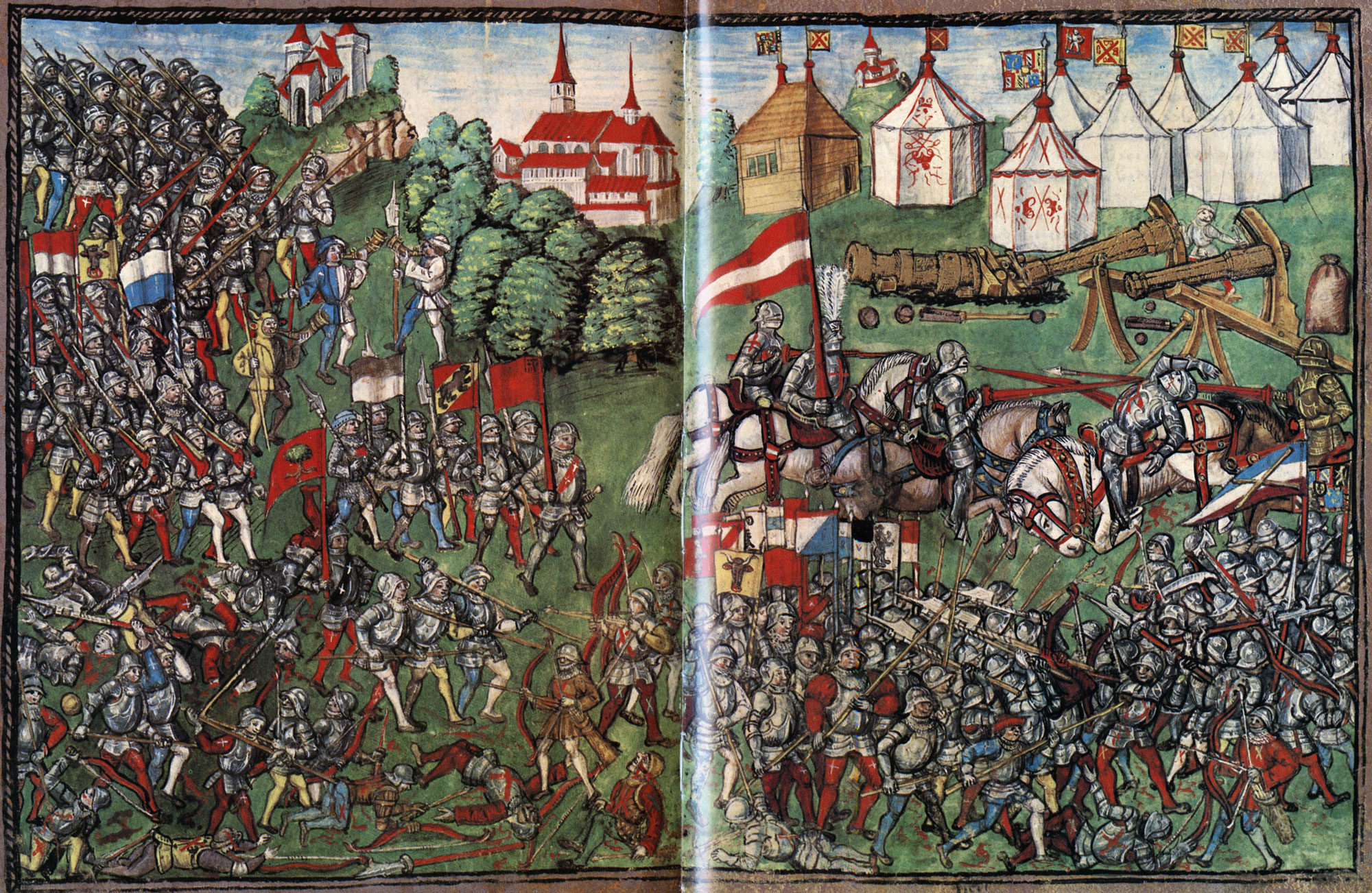
Early-16th-century miniature depicting the Battle of Grandson, from the Lucerner Schilling. Swiss soldiers can be seen armed with earlier halberds.

The halberd is first mentioned (as hallenbarte) in a work by 13th-century German poet Konrad von Würzburg. John of Winterthur described it as a new weapon used by the Swiss at the Battle of Morgarten of 1315. The halberd was inexpensive to produce and very versatile in battle. As the halberd was eventually refined, its point was more fully developed to allow it to deal better with spears and pikes (and make it able to push back approaching horsemen), as was the hook opposite the axe head, which could be used to pull horsemen to the ground. A Swiss peasant used a halberd to kill Charles the Bold, the Duke of Burgundy, at the Battle of Nancy, decisively ending the Burgundian Wars.

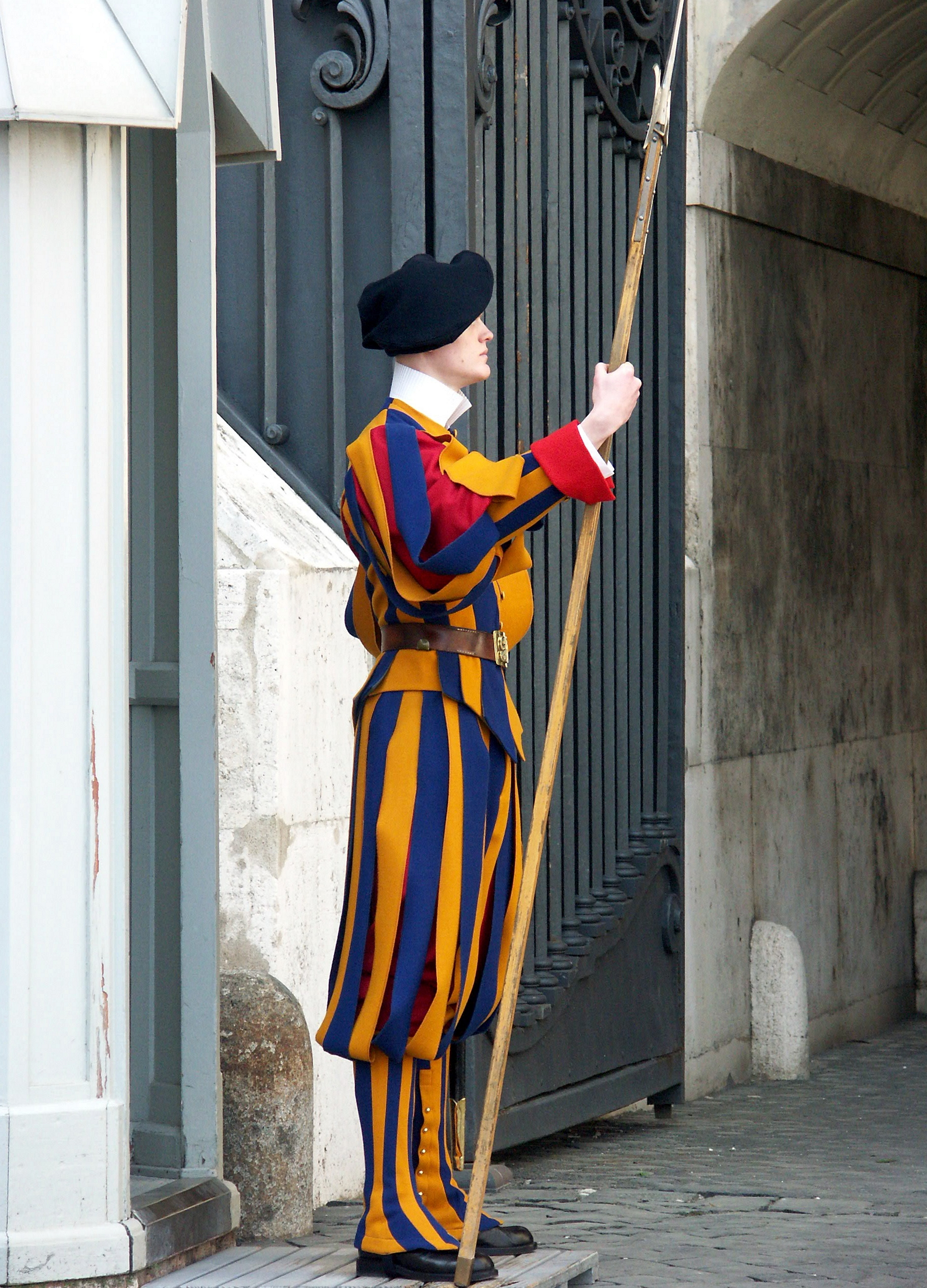
A member of the Swiss Guard with a halberd in the Vatican

The halberd was the primary weapon of the early Swiss armies in the 14th and early 15th centuries. Later the Swiss added the pike to better repel knightly attacks and roll over enemy infantry formations, with the halberd, hand-and-a-half sword, or the dagger known as the Schweizerdolch used for closer combat. The German Landsknechte, who imitated Swiss warfare methods, also used the pike, supplemented by the halberd—but their side arm of choice was a short sword called the Katzbalger.

As long as pikemen fought other pikemen, the halberd remained a useful supplementary weapon for push of pike, but when their position became more defensive, to protect the slow-loading arquebusiers and matchlock musketeers from sudden attacks by cavalry, the percentage of halberdiers in the pike units steadily decreased. By 1588, official Dutch infantry composition was down to 39% arquebuses, 34% pikes, 13% muskets, 9% halberds, and 5% two-handed swords. By 1600, troops armed exclusively with swords were no longer used and the halberd was only used by sergeants (two men per company).

Researchers suspected that a halberd or a bill sliced through the back of King Richard III's skull at the Battle of Bosworth Field on 22 August 1485, leaving his brain visible before killing him during the battle, and were later able to confirm that it was a halberd.

While rarer than it had been from the late 15th to mid-16th centuries, the halberd was still used infrequently as an infantry weapon well into the mid-17th century. The armies of the Catholic League in 1625, for example, had halberdiers comprising 7% of infantry units, with musketeers comprising 58% and armored pikemen 35%. By 1627 this had changed to 65% muskets, 20% pikes, and 15% halberds. A near-contemporary depiction of the 1665 Battle of Montes Claros at Palace of the Marquises of Fronteira depicts a minority of the Portuguese and Spanish soldiers as armed with halberds. Antonio de Pereda's 1635 painting El Socorro a Génova depicting the Relief of Genoa has all the soldiers armed with halberds. The most consistent users of the halberd in the Thirty Years' War were German sergeants who would carry one as a sign of rank. While they could use them in melee combat, more often they were used for dressing the ranks by grasping the shaft in both hands and pushing it against several men simultaneously. They could also be used to push pikes or muskets up or down, especially to stop overexcited musketeers from firing prematurely. Halberds and other polearms remained useful during instances of close-in fighting such as during stormings of towns and forts. At the Siege of Lyme Regis in April 1644 during the English Civil War, halberdiers were among the troops that repelled the attackers after their cannons made breaches in the walls.

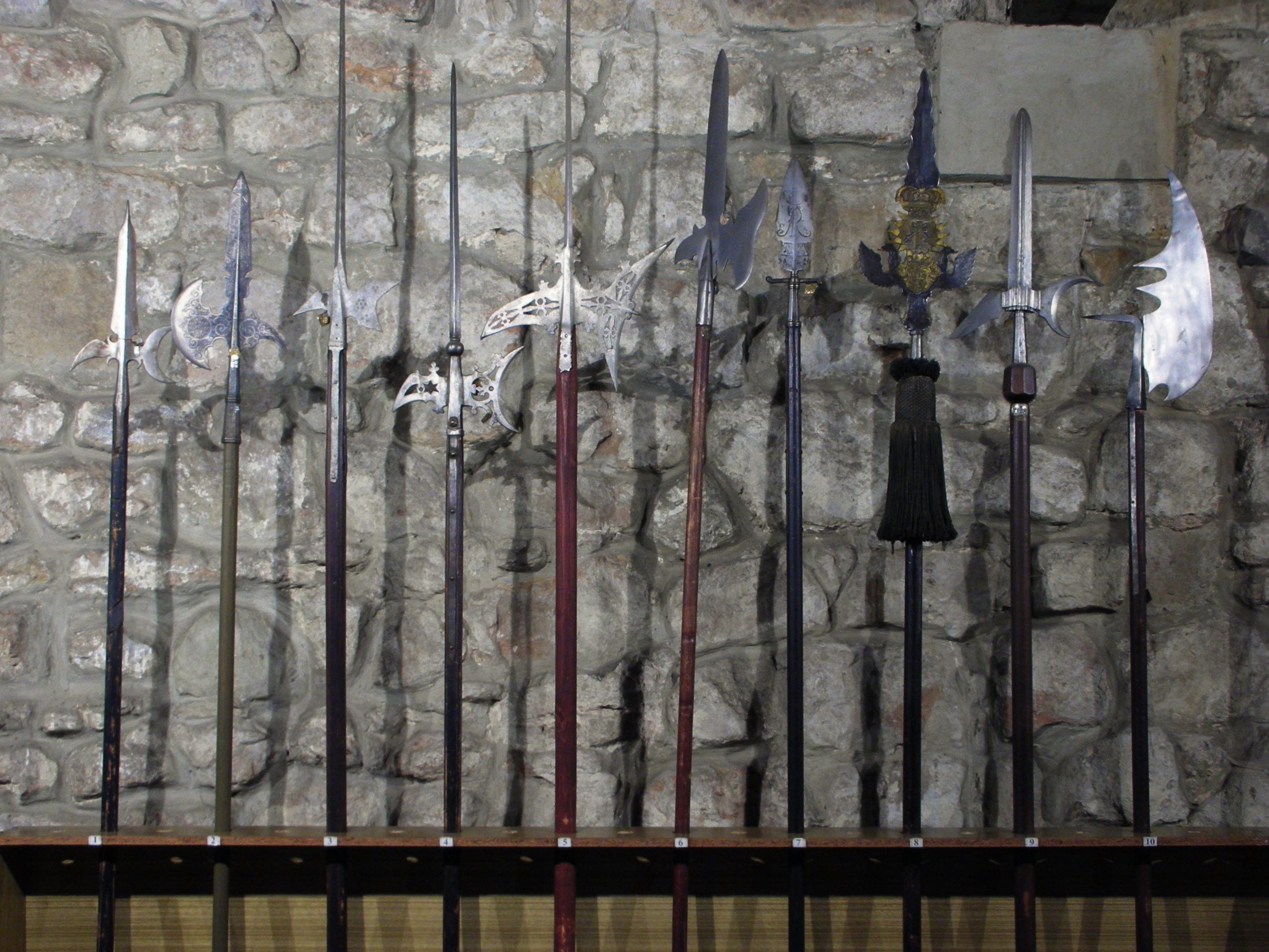
Halberds of various shapes, sizes, and ages

The halberd has been used as a court bodyguard weapon for centuries, and is still the ceremonial weapon of the Swiss Guard in the Vatican and the Alabarderos (Halberdiers) Company of the Spanish Royal Guard. The halberd was one of the polearms sometimes carried by lower-ranking officers in European infantry units in the 16th through 18th centuries. In the British army, sergeants continued to carry halberds until 1793, when they were replaced by spontoons. The 18th-century halberd had, however, become simply a symbol of rank with no sharpened edge and insufficient strength to use as a weapon. It served as an instrument for ensuring that infantrymen in ranks stood correctly aligned with each other and that their muskets were aimed at the correct level.

== The development of the halberd ==
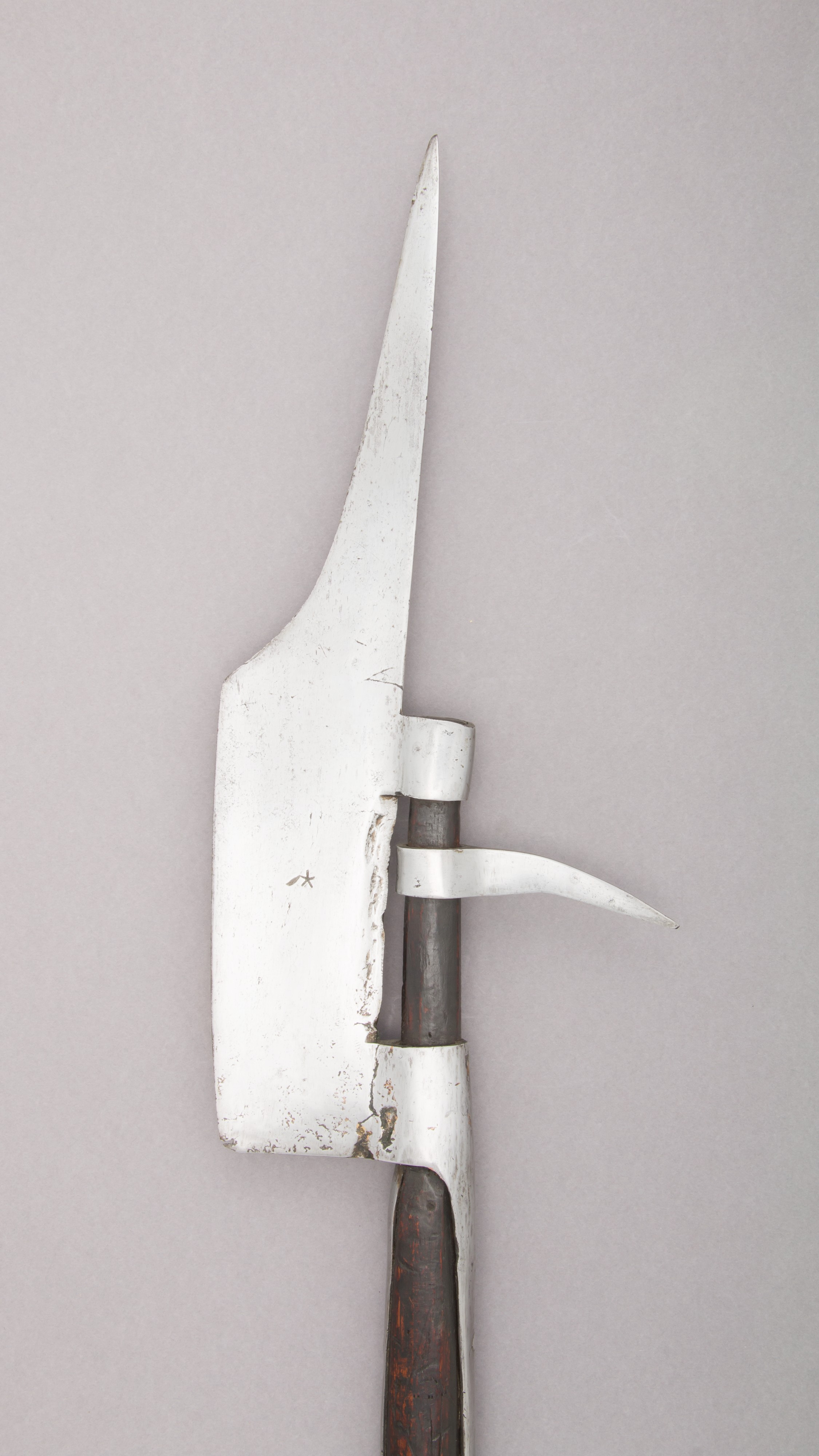
A late-14th/early-15th-century Halberd from Fribourg

The word helmbarte or variations of it show up in German texts from the 13th century onwards. At that point, the halberd is not too distinct from other types of broad axes or bardiches used all over Europe. In the late 13th century the weapon starts to develop into a distinct weapon, with the top of the blade developing into a more acute thrusting point.

This form of the halberd is erroneously sometimes called a voulge or a swiss voulge, but there is no evidence for the usage of these terms for this weapon historically.

There were variations of these weapons with spikes on the back, though also plenty without. In the early 15th century the construction changes to incorporate sockets into the blade, instead of hoops as the previous designs had. With this development back spikes are directly integrated into the blade construction and become a universal part of the halberd design.

== Similar and related polearms ==
Chinese deity holding a yue

- Bardiche, a type of two-handed battle axe known in the 16th and 17th centuries in Eastern Europe
- Bill, similar to a halberd but with a hooked blade form
- Ge or dagger-axe, a Chinese weapon in use from the Shang dynasty (est. 1500 BC) that had a dagger-shaped blade mounted perpendicular to a spearhead
- Fauchard, a curved blade atop a 2 m (6 ft 7 in) pole that was used in Europe between the 11th and 14th centuries
- Guisarme, a medieval bladed weapon on the end of a long pole; later designs implemented a small reverse spike on the back of the blade
- Glaive, a large blade, up to 45 cm (18 in) long, on the end of a 2 m (6 ft 7 in) pole
- Guandao, a Chinese polearm from the 3rd century AD that had a heavy curved blade with a spike at the back
- Ji (戟), a Chinese polearm combining a spear and dagger-axe
- Kamayari, a Japanese spear with blade offshoots
- Lochaber axe, a Scottish weapon that had a heavy blade attached to a pole in a similar fashion to early halberds
- Naginata, a Japanese weapon that had a 30-to-60-centimetre-long (12 to 24 in) blade attached by a sword guard to a wooden shaft
- Partisan, a large double-bladed spearhead mounted on a long shaft that had protrusions on either side for parrying sword thrusts
- Poleaxe, a type of polearm with an axehead or hammerhead on the sides with either a spike or spearhead at the top and mounted on a long shaft. It was developed in the 14th century and remained in use until the 16th century to breach the plate armour worn by European knights and men-at-arms
- Ranseur, a polearm consisting of a spearhead affixed with a cross hilt at its base derived from the earlier spetum
- Spontoon, a 17th-century weapon that consisted of a large blade with two side blades mounted on a long 2 m (6 ft 7 in) pole, considered a more elaborate pike
- Voulge, a crude single-edged blade bound to a wooden shaft
- Tabarzin, a type of battle axe from Middle East.
- War scythe, an improvised weapon that consisted of a blade from a scythe attached vertically to a shaft
- Welsh hook, similar to a halberd and thought to originate from a forest-bill
- Woldo, A Korean polearm that had a crescent-shaped blade mounted on a long shaft, similar in construction to the Chinese guandao, and primarily served as a symbol of the Royal Guard
- Yue, a Chinese axe with long shaft.

== Gallery ==
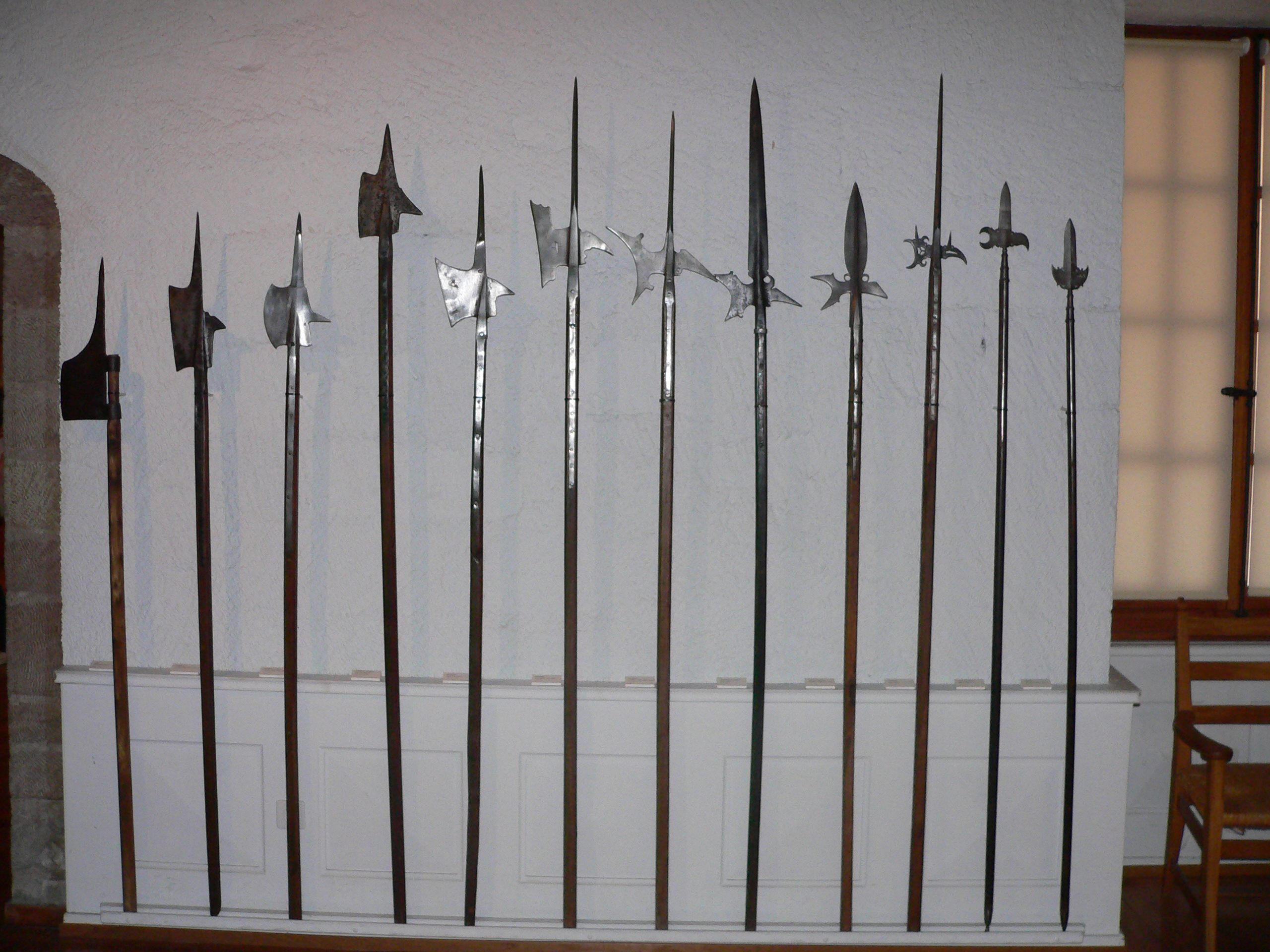
Different sorts of halberds and halberd-like polearms in Switzerland

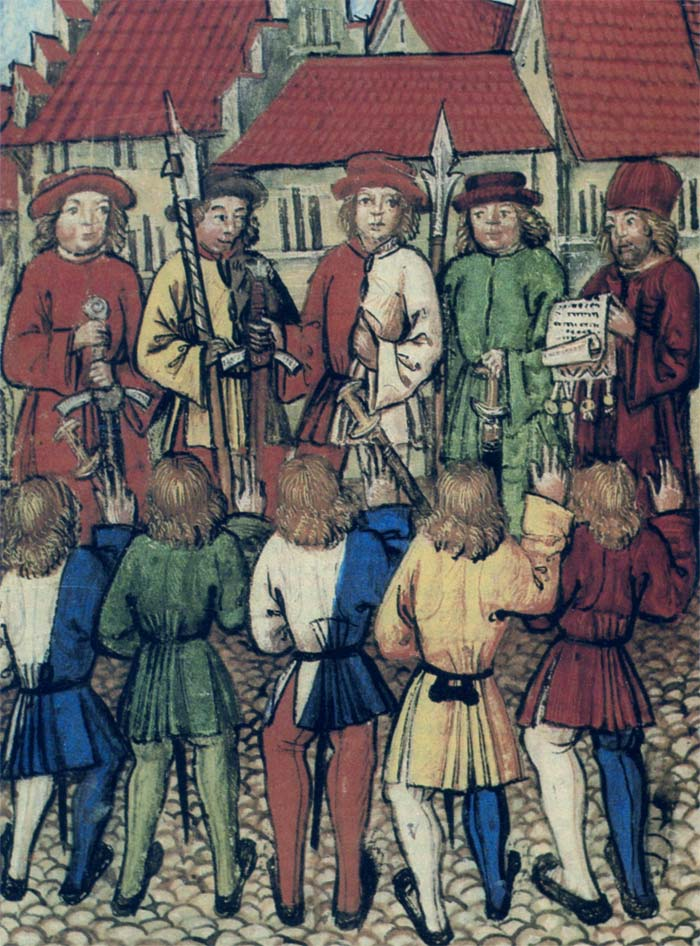
Citizens of Zürich on 1 May 1351 are read the Federal Charter as they swear allegiance to representatives of Uri, Schwyz, Unterwalden and Lucerne. One of the representatives carries a typical Swiss halberd of the period depicted (as opposed to the time the image was made, 1515).

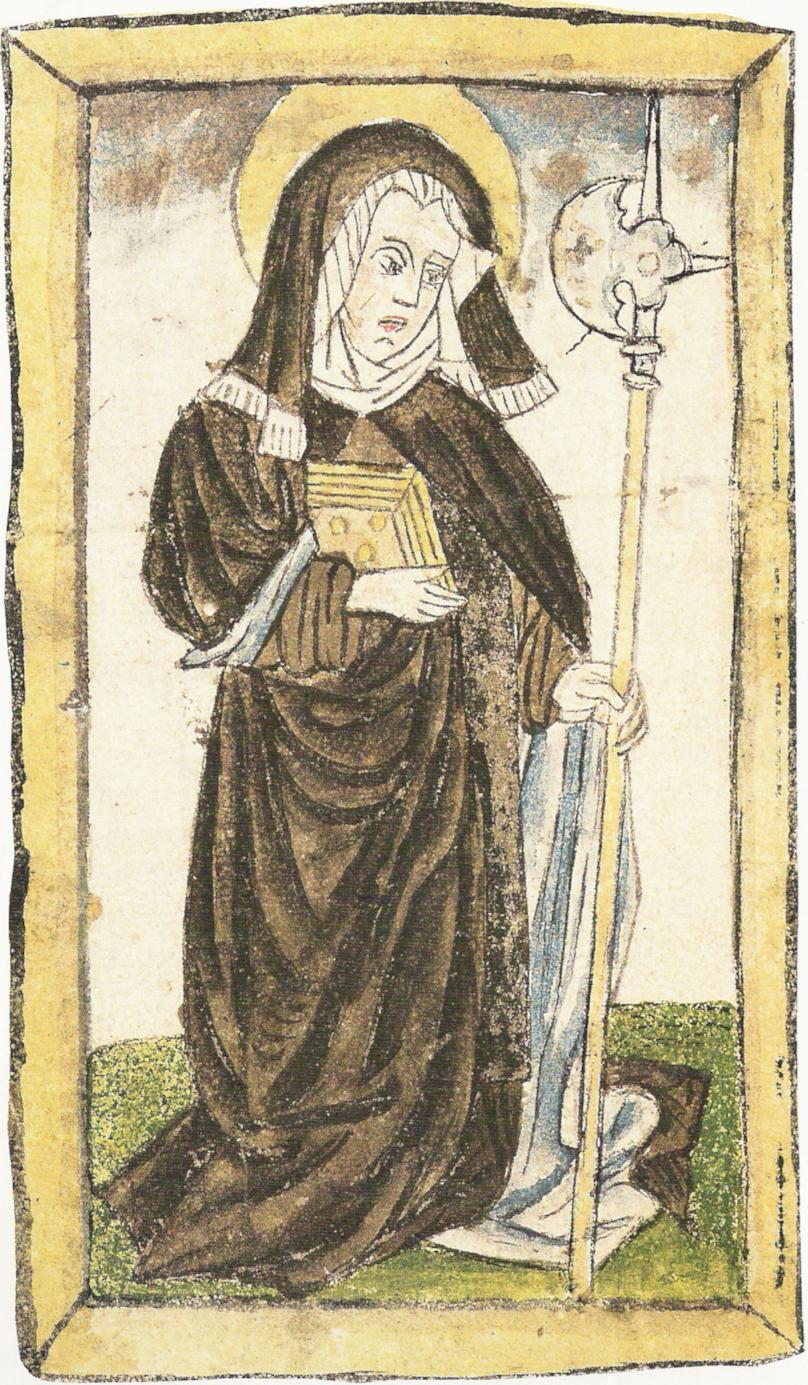
Saint Wiborada is often (anachronistically) depicted with a halberd to indicate the means of her martyrdom.

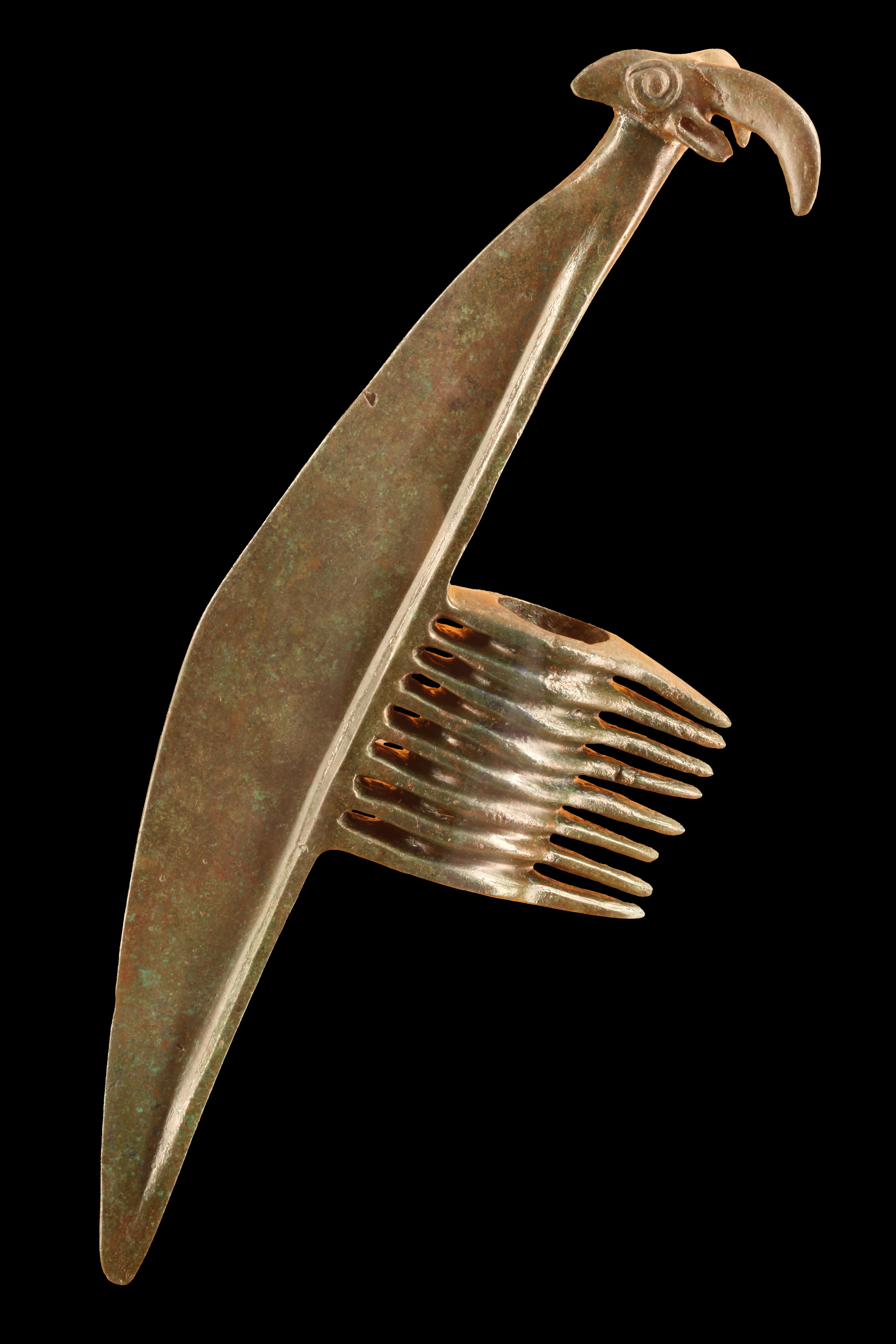
Halberd-axe head with the head of a mouflon. Late 2nd millennium–early 1st millennium BC. From Amlash, Gilan, Iran

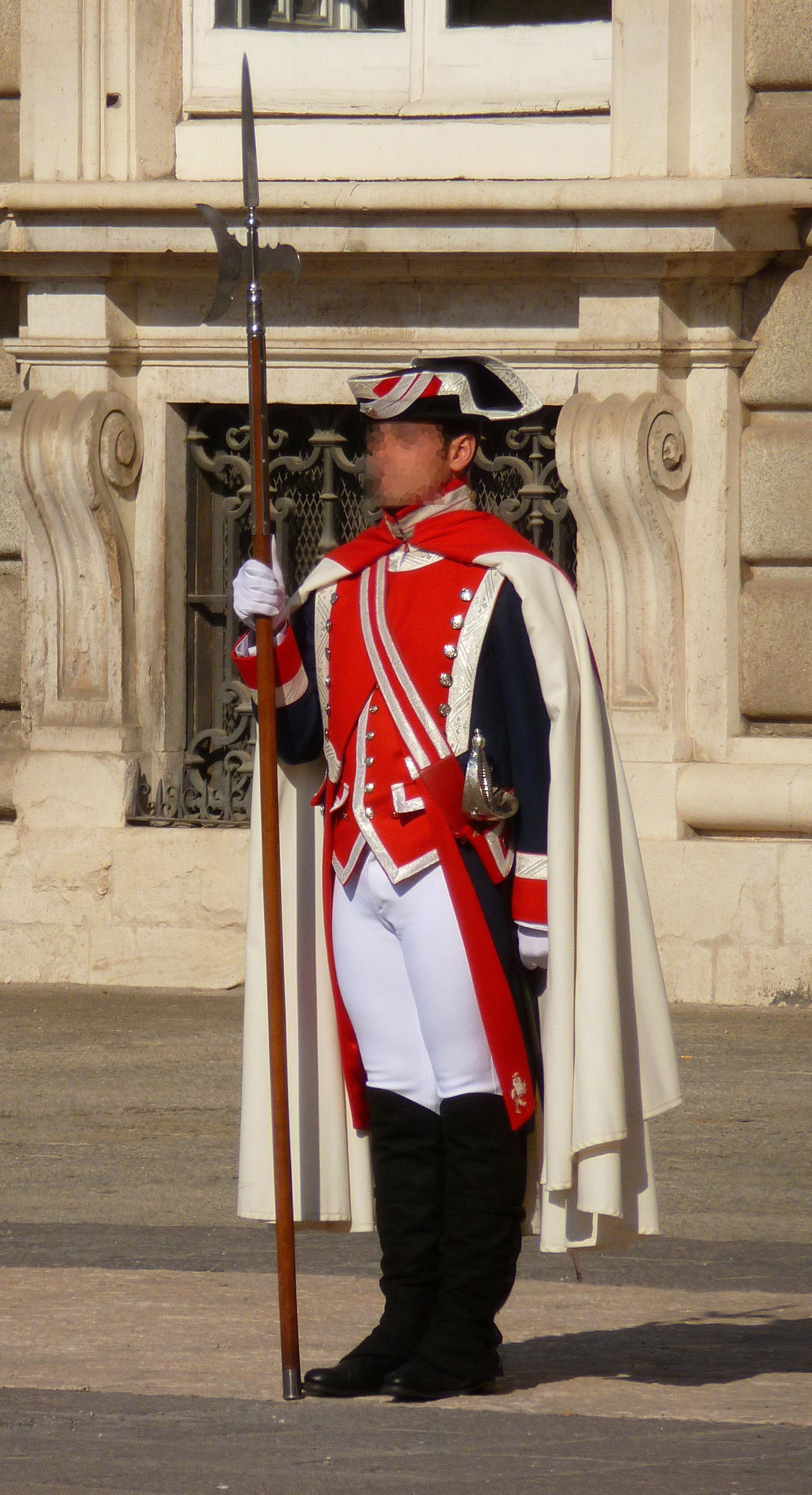
Alabardero (Halberdier) of the Spanish Royal Guard

== See also ==
- Dagger-axe
- Naginata
- Viking halberd
- Woldo

== Bibliography ==
- Brandtherm, Dirk & O'Flaherty, Ronan; Prodigal sons: two 'halberds' in the Hunt Museum, Limerick, from Cuenca, Spain and Beyrǔt, Syria, pp. 56–60, JRSAI Vol.131 (2001).
- Chisholm, Hugh, ed. (1911). "Halbert" . Encyclopædia Britannica. Vol. 12 (11th ed.). Cambridge University Press. p. 830.
- Lorge, Peter A. (2011), Chinese Martial Arts: From Antiquity to the Twenty-First Century, Cambridge: Cambridge University Press, ISBN 978-0-521-87881-4
- O'Flaherty, Ronan; The Early Bronze Age halberd: a history of research and a brief guide to the sources, pp. 74–94, Journal of the Royal Society of Antiquaries of Ireland, Vol.128 (1998).
- R. E. Oakeshott, European weapons and armour: From the Renaissance to the industrial revolution (1980), 44–48.
