= Glaive =

Type of pole weapon

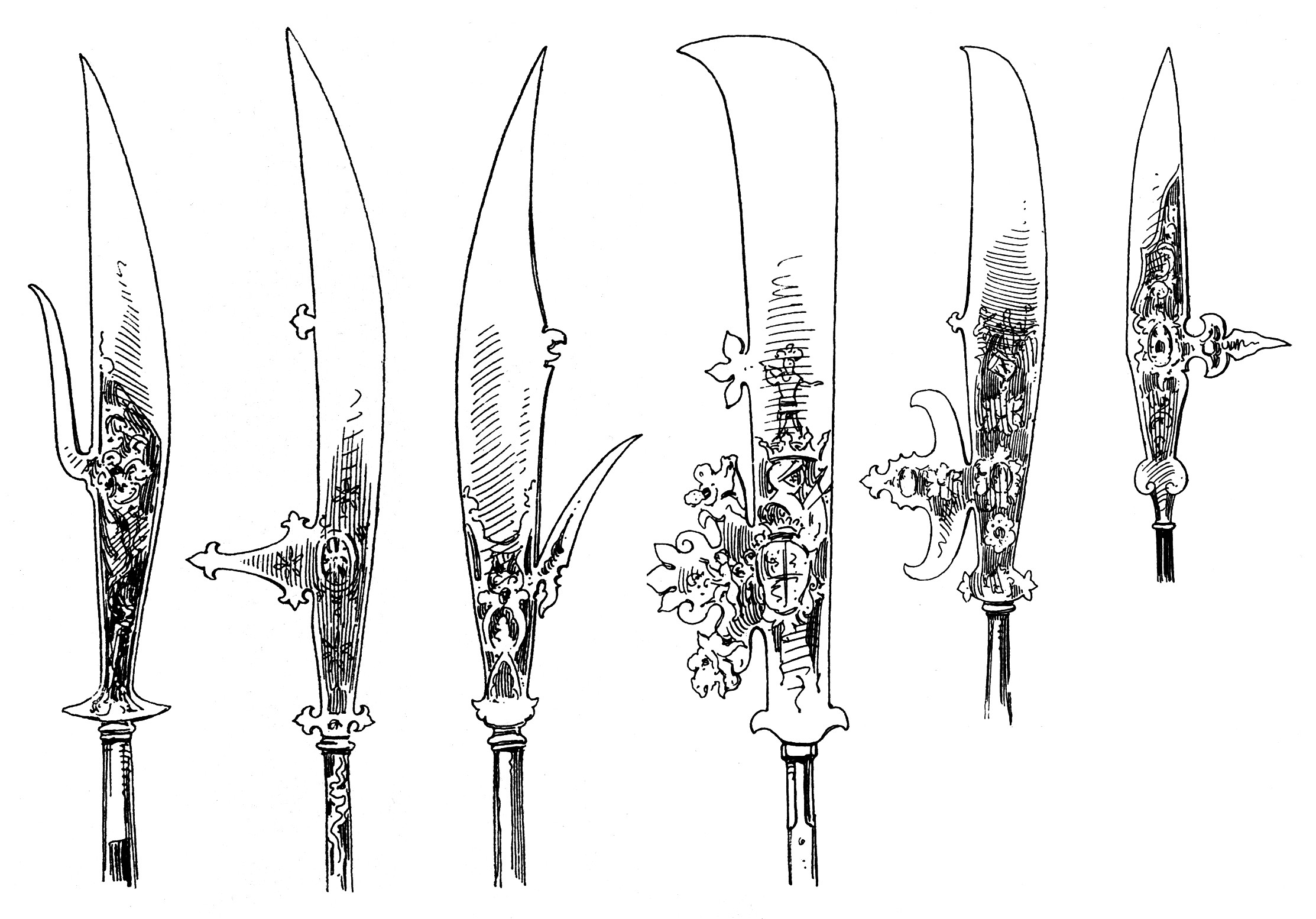
Glaives (from Handbook of Weapon Knowledge: Weaponry in Its Historical Development from the Beginning of the Middle Ages to the End of the 18th Century by Wendelin Boeheim, c. 1890)

A glaive, sometimes spelled as glave, is a type of pole weapon, with a single-edged blade on the end, known for its distinctive design and versatile combat applications. There are many similar polearms such as the war scythe, the Japanese naginata, the Chinese guandao (yanyuedao), the Korean woldo, and the Russian sovnya.

A glaive typically consists of a single-edged blade approximately 45 centimeters long affixed to a pole measuring about 2 meters. The blade is secured in a socket-shaft configuration, akin to an axe head, as opposed to having a tang like a sword or naginata. Some variations of glaive blades were even forged with a small hook on the reverse side to better engage mounted opponents, earning them the name "glaive-guisarmes."

In the 1599 treatise "Paradoxes of Defence" by English gentleman George Silver, the glaive is described as being used in a manner similar to other polearms like the quarterstaff, half pike, bill, halberd, voulge, and partisan. Silver considered this class of polearms superior to all other hand-to-hand combat weapons.

The Morgan Bible, also known as the Maciejowski Bible, features illustrations of two-handed glaives used on horseback, showcasing their historical application in mounted combat.

The contemporary term for this weapon may have been "faussart," which referred to various single-edged weapons related to the scythe, alongside terms like falchion, falcata, or fauchard, all derived from the Latin term for "scythe."

Historical records suggest that the glaive may have originated in Wales and remained a national weapon until the late 15th century. There is a mention of a warrant from the first year of Richard III's reign, dated 1483, for the production of "two hundred Welsh glaives," further highlighting its historical significance in weaponry.

It has been argued that the glaive had its origin in Wales, and that it remained a national weapon until the end of the XVth Century. Grose mentions a warrant (Harleian MS., No. 433) issued to Nicholas Spicer, dated the first year of Richard III's reign, 1483 for enrolling of smiths for "the making of two hundred Welsh glaives" – twenty shillings and sixpence being the charge for thirty glaives with their staves, made at Abergavenny and Llanllowel.

== Design ==
The glaive typically consists of three main components:

- Blade: The blade of the glaive varies in size and shape, but it is generally a curved blade with a single cutting edge. This blade design allows for effective slashing and cutting movements.
- Shaft: The glaive's shaft is typically made of wood or metal and ranges from 6 to 7 feet in length, making it a polearm suitable for thrusting and striking from a distance.
- Hilt: At the base of the shaft, the glaive often features a hilt or grip that allows the wielder to maintain a secure hold during combat.

== Usage ==
The glaive was a versatile weapon on the battlefield. It was effective for both cutting and thrusting, and its long reach allowed warriors to strike opponents from a relatively safe distance. Some common glaive techniques included sweeping strikes to disarm or incapacitate enemies and thrusting attacks to penetrate armor.

Glaives were used by infantry and could be particularly effective against mounted opponents, as they could target the horse or rider. These weapons were employed in various historical conflicts, from the medieval European battlefields to the Far East.

== Cultural significance ==
The glaive holds cultural significance not only for its martial applications but also for its representation in art, literature, and folklore. It is often depicted in medieval tapestries and illuminated manuscripts, showcasing its presence in European history.

The weapon has made appearances in numerous fantasy and historical fiction works, cementing its place in popular culture. It is frequently associated with knights and medieval warriors in contemporary portrayals of chivalry.

== Modern interpretations ==
In the modern era, the glaive continues to be popular among enthusiasts of historical reenactment, martial arts, and collectors of historical weaponry. It is often featured in stage combat and reenactment events. The glaive has also influenced the design of fictional weapons in various forms of media, including video games, movies, and television series.

== Other uses of the word ==
The word "glaive" has historically been given to several very different types of weapons; it originated from French. Almost all etymologists derive it from either the Latin (gladius) or Celtic (cladivos, compare claymore) word for sword. Nevertheless, all the earliest attestations in both French and English refer to spears. It is attested in this meaning in English roughly from the 14th to 16th centuries.

Around the same time, it also began being used as a poetic word for sword. In Modern French, glaive refers to short swords, especially the Roman gladius.

The term "glaive" is used in the science-fiction/fantasy film Krull to refer to a thrown weapon, similar to the shuriken, chakram, or mambele, which can return to the thrower, much like a boomerang. Glaive has been used to describe this fictional type of weapon in films, video games, such as Warframe, Dark Sector and Bloons TD 6, and other fantasy media since. The Dark Crystal: Age of Resistance had its own Gelfling holy relic the "Dual-Glaive" which was itself a double-bladed weapon also more akin to a sword.
