= Guisarme =

Type of polearm

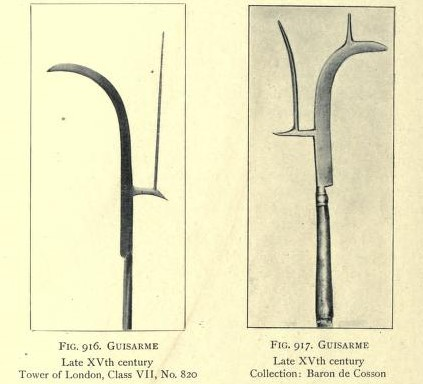
Two examples of Guisarmes

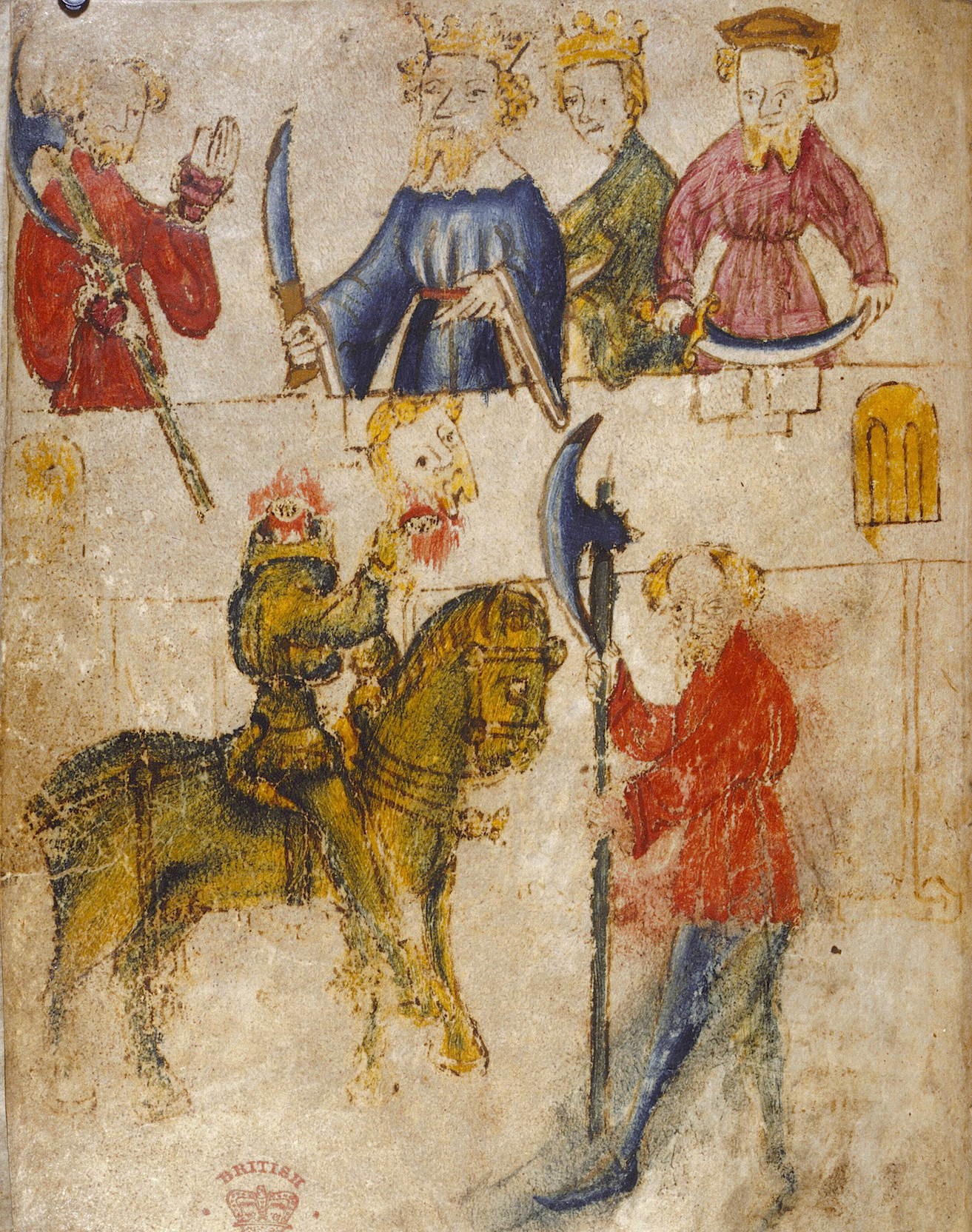
Illustration of a scene from Sir Gawain and the Green Knight, showing an axe-shaped "giserne".

A guisarme (sometimes gisarme, giserne or bisarme) is a polearm used in Europe primarily between 1000 and 1400. Its origin is likely Germanic, from the Old High German getīsarn, literally "weeding iron". Like many medieval polearms, the exact early form of the weapon is hard to define from literary references, and the identification of surviving weapons can be speculative.

== Possible interpretations of form ==
Two main modern schools of thought exist:

1. Like most polearms the guisarme was developed by peasants by combining hand tools with long poles: in this case by putting a pruning hook onto a spear shaft. According to Sir Guy Francis Laking, among the polearms, the guisarme was second only to the spear in importance for the medieval soldier class. In fact, it was so effective that by the 13th century there was active support for its banishment from the battlefield. While early designs were simply a hook on the end of a long pole, later designs implemented a small reverse spike on the back of the blade. Eventually weapon makers incorporated the usefulness of the hook in a variety of different polearms, and guisarme became a catch-all for any weapon that included a hook on the blade. This is exemplified by the terms bill-guisarmes, voulge-guisarmes, and glaive-guisarmes.
2. An alternative definition is given by Ewart Oakeshott in his book European Weapons and Armour. He sees the guisarme as a "crescent shaped double socketed axe" on a long shaft. His primary reason is the use of the term "giserne" and axe interchangeably for the same weapon in the poem Sir Gawain and the Green Knight. This interpretation is also favoured by John Waldmann.

=== Illustrations and textual evidence ===
Supporting the second interpretation are the illustrations in the original manuscript of the Gawain poem which clearly show Sir Gawain with a long crescent shaped axe (see right). However, other texts from the same period draw a distinction from the axe and guisarme (Such as in Chaucer's Romaunt of the Rose: "With swerd, or sparth (axe) or gysarme" and Mandeville's Travels: "with swerds drawen and gysarmez and axes") and the use in the epic poem Sir Gawain and the Green Knight may have been poetic license. Olivier de la Marche, writing in the 15th century, describes the guisarme as "hafted combination of a dagger and a battle axe" and describes the weapon being of "great antiquity".

In his novel Knight in Anarchy, George Shipway describes the process of training for a judicial duel using the guisarme, where he favours the double-socketed axe interpretation of the weapon.
