= Jedwart stave =

16th century polearm from the Scottish Borders

The Jedwart stave (called the Jeddart or Jedburgh stave) was a polearm weapon commonly found in the Scottish Borders in the 16th century. It consisted of a large, thin, double-edged axe-like blade attached to a roughly four-foot long studded stave with a hand guard, similar in appearance to a bardiche. The upheaval of the sixteenth century in the borders proved the weapon to be too light to be effective against the heavy cavalry of the Border Reivers and attacks from the English, and it fell out of favour in combat. It remained however a common household weapon for purpose of self-defence.

== See also ==
- Lochaber axe
- Scottish polearms
