= Spetum =

Medieval European polearm

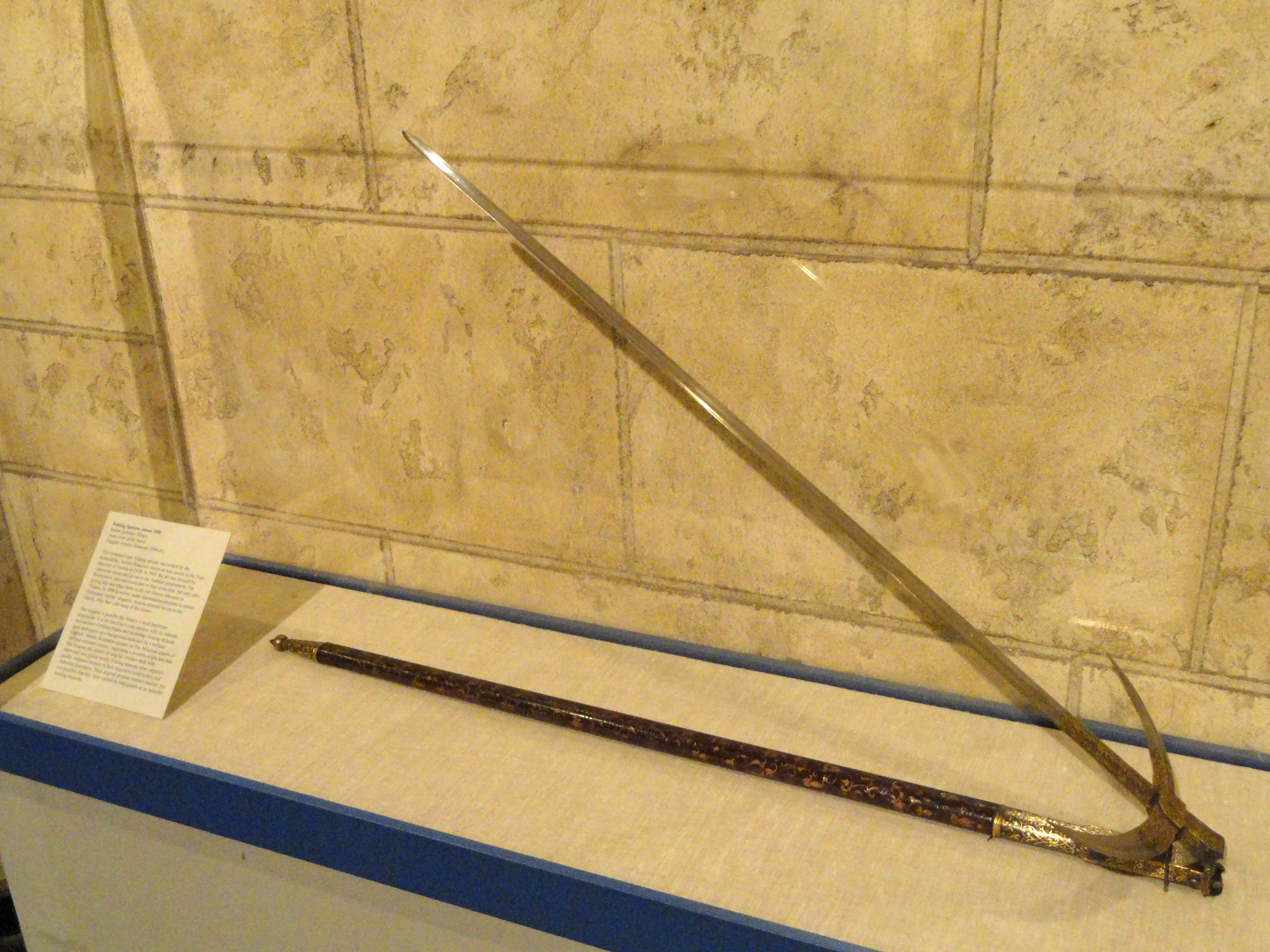
Italian folding spetum, c. 1550

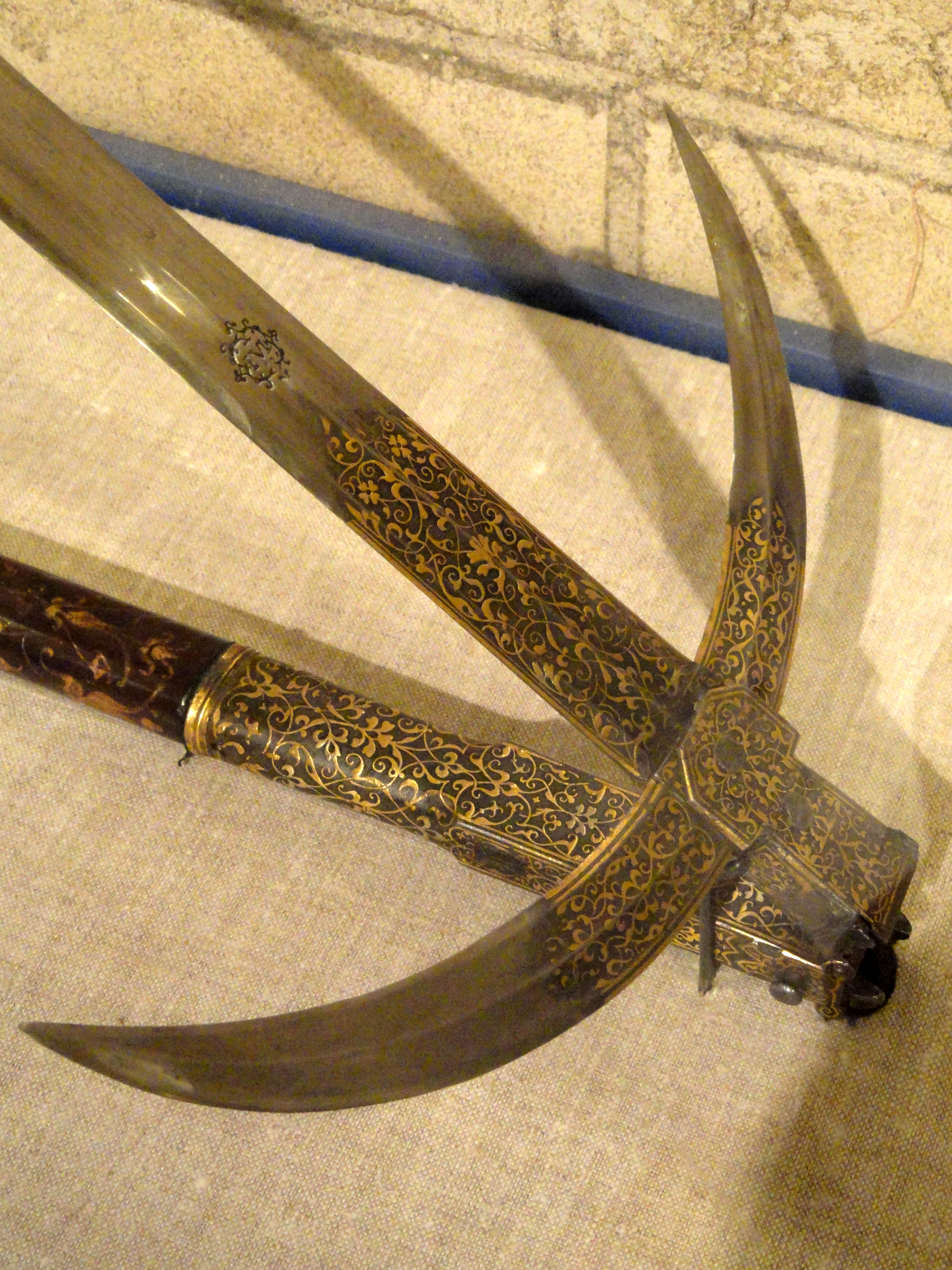
Detail of folding spetum showing hinge and side blades

A spetum is a polearm that was used in Europe during the 13th century. Other names include chauve souris, corseca, corsèsque, korseke, runka, and rawcon. It consists of a pole, some 180–240 cm (71–94 in) long, on which is mounted a spear head with two projections at its base.

According to antiquarian John Hewitt, the spetum is a variation of the partisan. Many variations of this design were devised; the ranseur may be one. The spetum is usually distinguished from the ranseur and partisan by its single-edged "prongs" used for slashing. The main blade is 30–35 cm (12–14 in) long. The spetum shown in the image is measured at 118 cm (46 in) meaning the blade is marginally shorter than 118 cm, while the side blades are about half that length and are set at acute angles.

Spetums are designed for combat. The main blade is long enough to destroy any significant organ in the human body with one thrust. The side blades could bind weapons, similar to a jitte or sai. The blunt backs of the side blades give the spetum uses such as tripping and knocking aside shields, while providing far more strength to the sharpened side and points than is possible with a dual-edged construction.

The word spetum comes from Italian spedo meaning "spit".
