= Ranseur =

Type of pole weapon

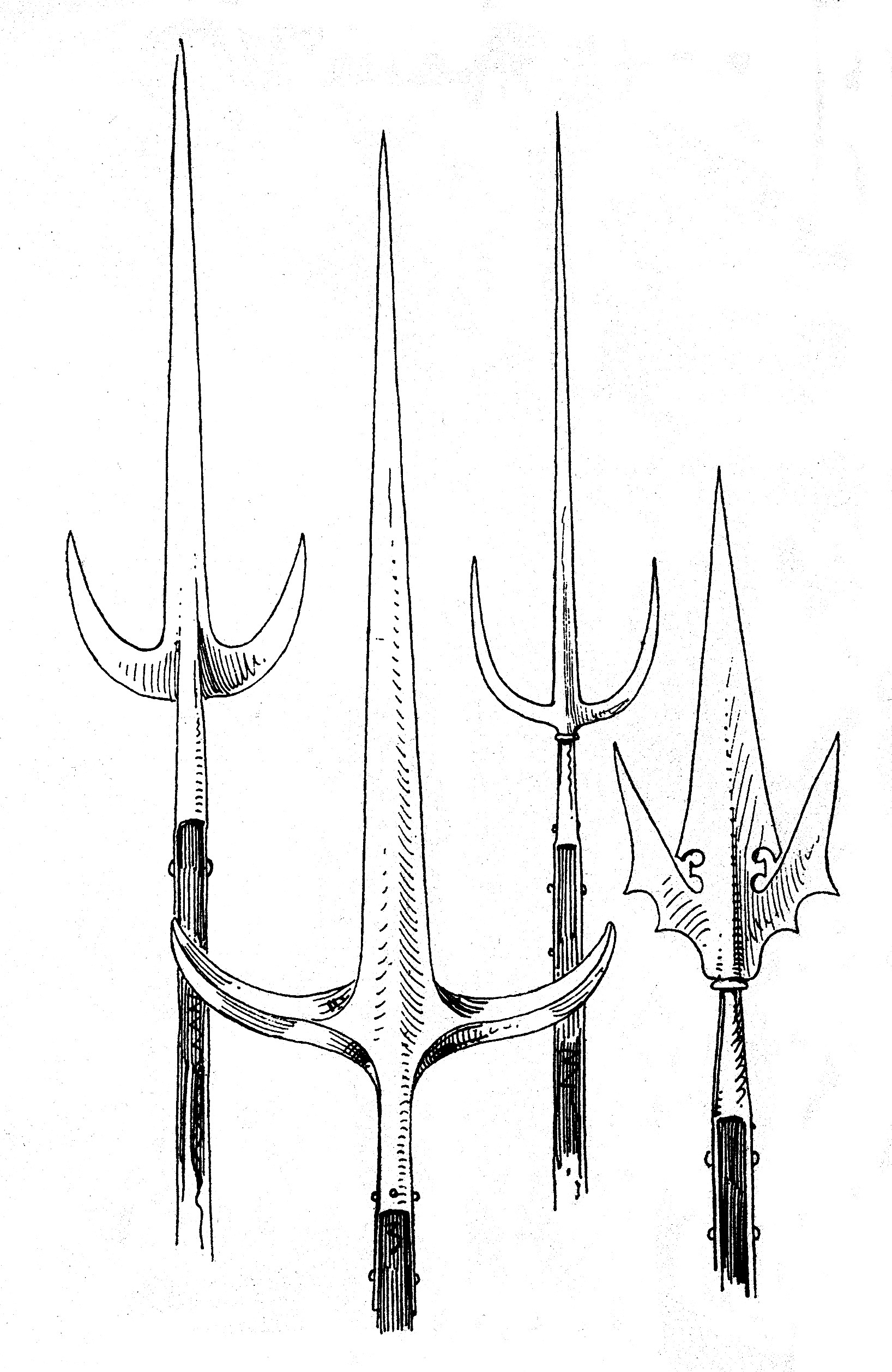
Types of ranseur, 16th century

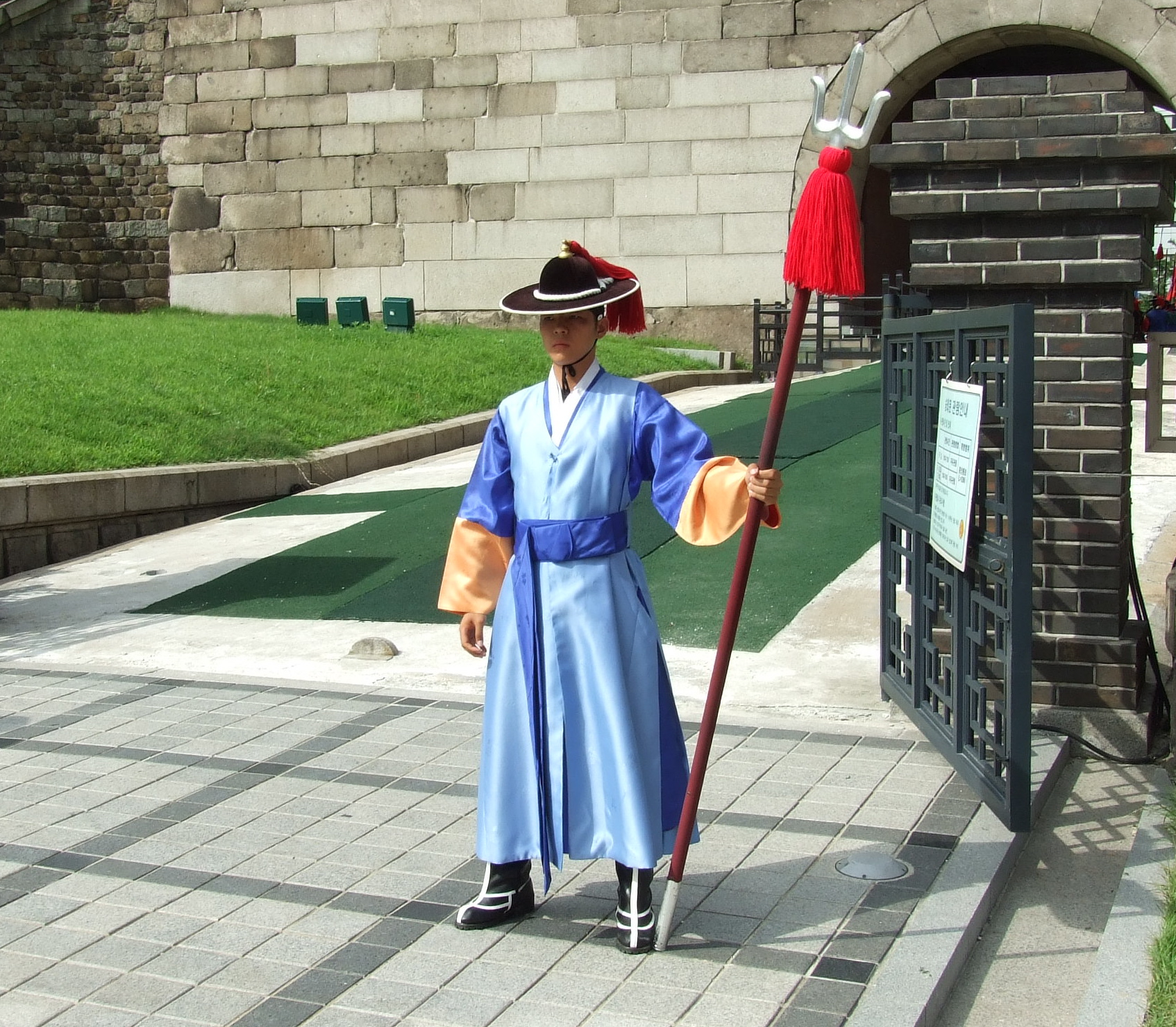
A similar weapon was used in Korea. Shown is a modern reenactor of Korean guard armed with dangpa (당파)

A ranseur, also called Brandistocco or Runka, was a polearm similar to the partisan used in Europe up to the 15th century. It was still seen in court as a ceremonial weapon through the 17th century.

Often thought to be a derivation of the earlier spetum, the head of a ranseur consists of a spear-tip affixed with a cross hilt at its base. Often this hilt is crescent-shaped, giving it an appearance similar to that of a trident. Generally, the hilts do not have a cutting edge, unlike the double-edged partisan. Ranseurs are generally 6 ft (1.8 m) in length or longer.

The spearing function of the weapon is apparent but not always effective against armor of great protection. The deflection includes the trapping of opponents' weapons in the space below the main blade, where a twist of the shaft can apply pressure from that moment on at long range, and of pulling mounted opponents from the saddle.

== See also ==
- Partisan (weapon), a similar looking polearm with thicker side blades
