= Bardiche =

Type of long poleaxe

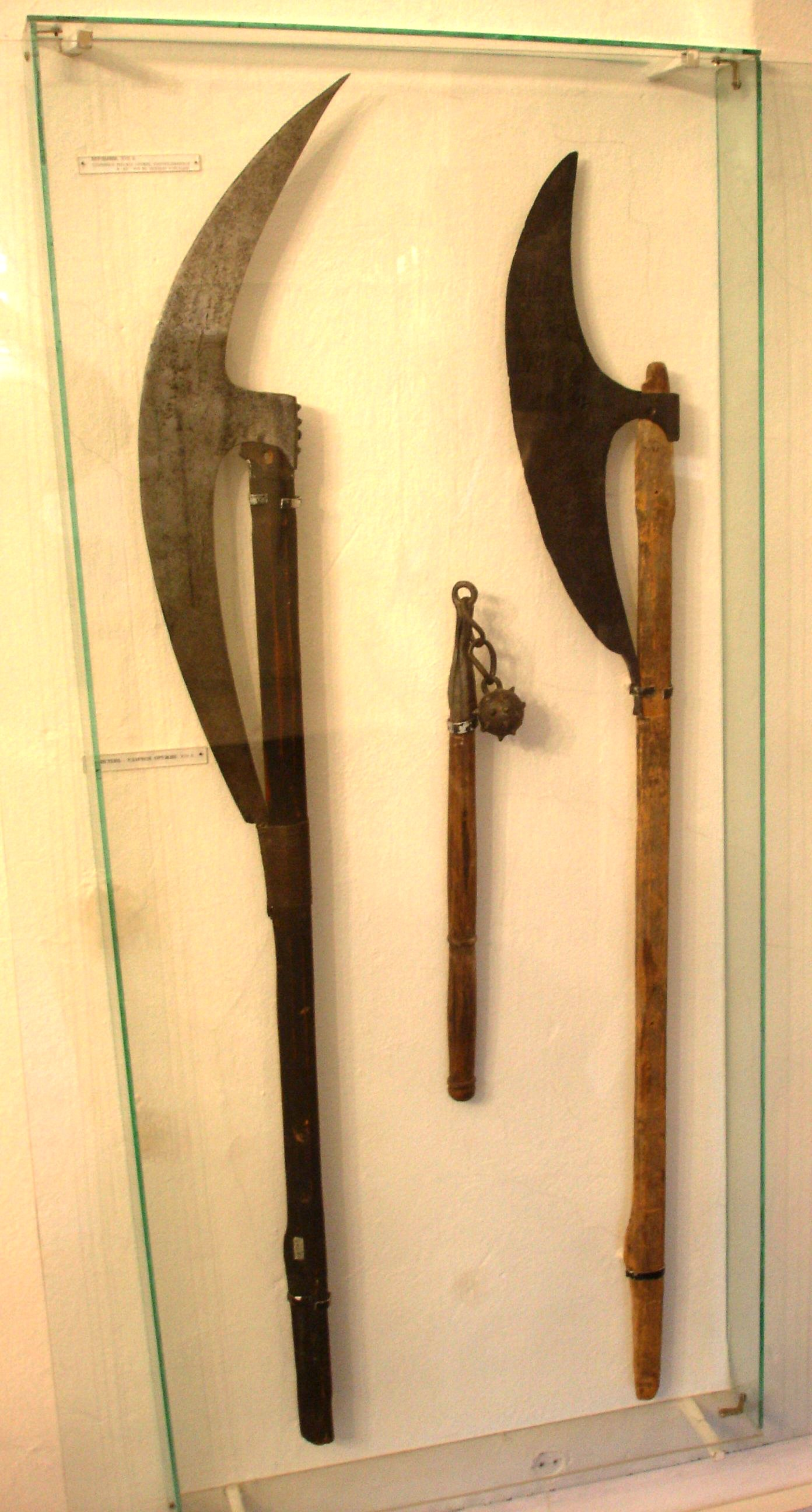
Two examples of a bardiche together with a flail, on display in Suzdal

A bardiche /bɑːrˈdiːʃ/, berdiche, bardische, bardeche, or berdish is a type of polearm used from the 14th to 17th centuries in Europe. Ultimately a descendant of the medieval sparth axe or Dane axe, the bardiche proper appears around 1400, but there are numerous medieval manuscripts that depict very similar weapons beginning c. 1250. The bardiche differs from the halberd in having neither a hook at the back nor a spear point at the top. The use of bardiches started in early 14th-century Austria.

In the 16th century, the bardiche was associated with the streltsy, arquebusiers of the Tsardom of Russia that was established by Ivan the Terrible.

== Description ==
[The broad-headed axe] was succeeded by the berdiche, a pole-axe, longer in shaft and having the narrow lower end of tall blade rounded inward and braced against the shaft. At first this lower end of the blade merely touched the wooden shaft; it then became fastened to it; next it embraced the shaft, developing for this purpose an encircling loop, like the main ring which forms the socket of the axe-head. This "generalized" type of pole-axe was common to all countries of Europe before the year 1400. It was essentially the butcher's heavy weapon with which he clave the head of an ox. It was this primitive halberd which the Swiss mountaineers used in their early struggle with Austria, and at Sempach and Mortgarten it destroyed much splendid armor. But in battle it was found useful not only for chopping but for thrusting, hence the narrowing of the front end of its plate.

The blade varied greatly in shape, but was most often a long, cleaver-type blade. The distinction was in how the blade was attached to the pole. The bardiche blade was attached to the pole either via two sockets (one at the top of the pole and one lower, at the base of the blade) or one socket at the top and one surface mount at the base, effectively mounting the heavy blade to the wooden shaft. This construction is also seen in Scottish polearms, such as the Lochaber axe and Jeddart staff, and bardiches are known to have been imported into Scotland in the 16th and 17th centuries. Depending on the design of the particular weapons in question, at times a bardiche may greatly resemble a voulge.

While the blade was often very long for an axe (usually exceeding 2 feet (60 cm)) the shaft was one of the shortest of all polearms; rarely did it exceed 5 feet (1.5 m) in length. It relied more on the weight of its heavy blade to do the damage than a swing from a long pole. This makes the bardiche more similar to the Dane axe, in some respects, than to a true polearm.

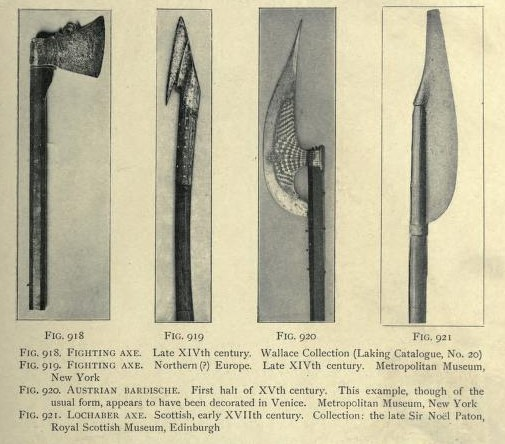
Several medieval battle axes including a 15th-century Austrian bardiche

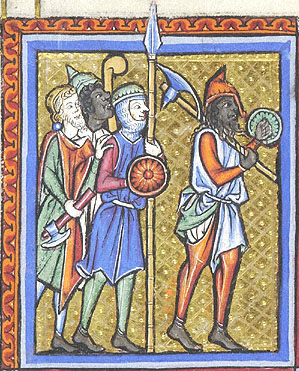
Illustration from the Psalter–Hours of Ghuiluys de Boisleux, 1246–1250 (Morgan Collection, MS M.730). The man on far right carries what appears to be an early bardiche.

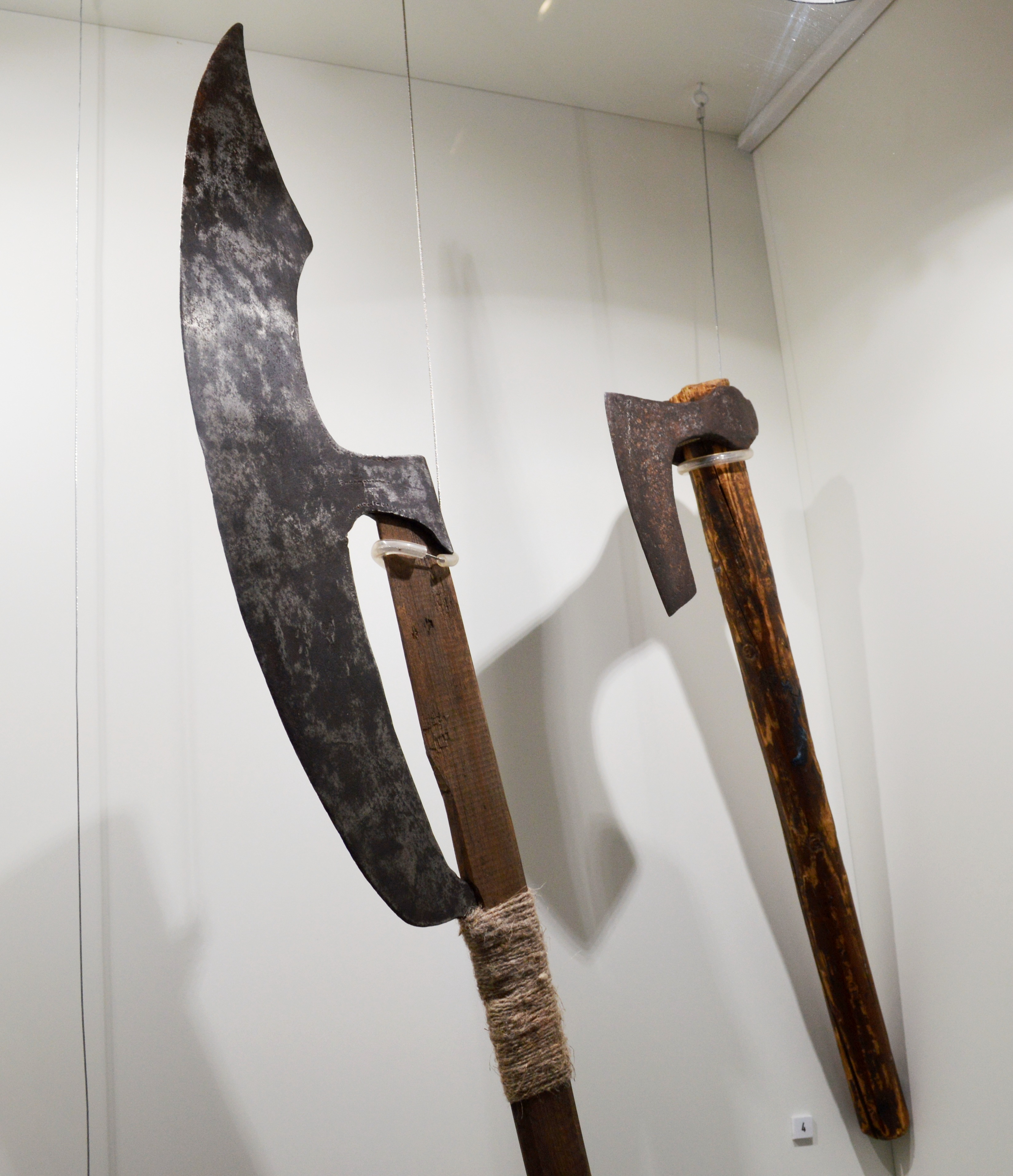
17th-century bardiche alongside a contemporary axe

== Use ==
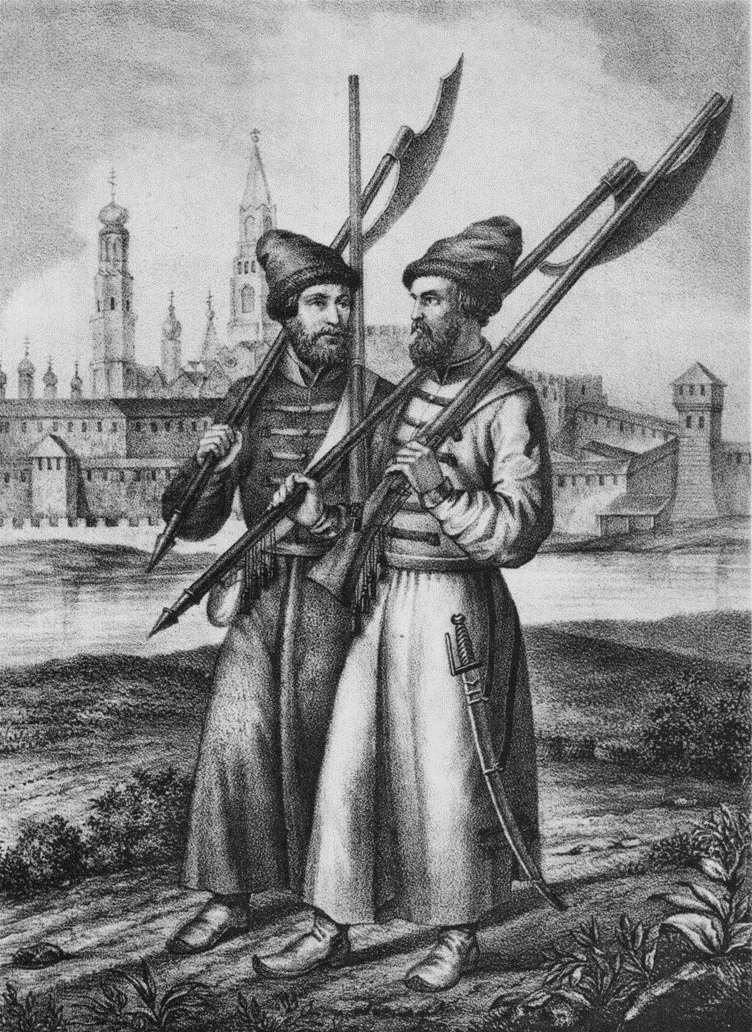
17th-century streltsy with musket and bardiche

It is believed that in pre-imperial Russia and the Polish–Lithuanian Commonwealth, this weapon was used to rest handguns upon when firing. It was standard equipment for the streltsy (on foot, mounted, and dragoon units) and also for the infantry of the Commonwealth; a shorter version was invented by John III Sobieski, ruler of the Commonwealth. Contrary to popular belief, there is no evidence of Russian streltsy using the bardiche as a musquet rest. The recoil from the shot could have harmed other soldiers in the line, and the wide blade obscured their view. Instead of using the bardiche for heavy handguns streltsy used "podsoshniki", specially made and supplied to the army, were used as rests.

== See also ==
- Lochaber axe
