= Faussart =

Single-edged weapon of Medieval Europe

The Faussart is a long-bladed, two-handed weapon, sometimes referred to as a warbrand by modern reproduction manufacturers. It is essentially an elongated arming sword or later-period messer, possibly an ancestor of the longsword. Though scant when it comes to both literary and iconographic references, the Faussart was possibly used by both cavalry and infantry. It is usually illustrated wielded by cavalry, usually of the knightly class, indicating it as a high-end weapon in contemporary sources.

The words faussard, fauchard and falsarium are also used to refer to this weapon.

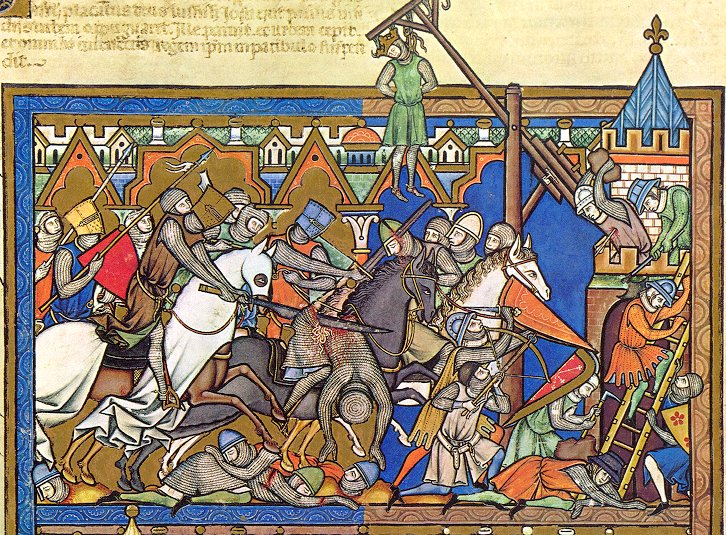
Image taken from the Morgan Bible (Folio 10 Verso - top). The Faussart is in the forefront slicing into a mounted soldier.

== Origins ==
The weapon probably relates to the agricultural tool for grass cutting, the Scythe. The Maciejowski Bible (Morgan Bible) depicts an example of a two-handed Faussart used by a mounted knight.

== Features ==
The Faussart had a straight, one-sided sharpened pointed blade, that was both slender and long. It carried a long handle for a two handed grip, which allowed a powerful blow from horseback. It also seems to have been light enough for one-hand handling, but could also be carried with two hands, so that it could be hefted with more strength, which was equally appropriate for mounted users and foot soldiers. The Warbrand in the Maciejowski Bible is shown without a guard, but it does not need it as a pure weapon.

== Preservation ==
There are no extant examples in existence of the Faussart, and no written descriptions of it, or manuals covering techniques for its use. The English term "Warbrand", simply meaning "War Sword", is an erroneous modern term appended to the weapon by companies that sell modern reproductions.

== Evolution/Development ==
The Faussart seems to have developed into the two-handed longsword, or was made redundant by it, as there is no evidence that it continued to be used into the Late Medieval era when the longsword became commonplace.
