= Lochaber axe =

Scottish polearm

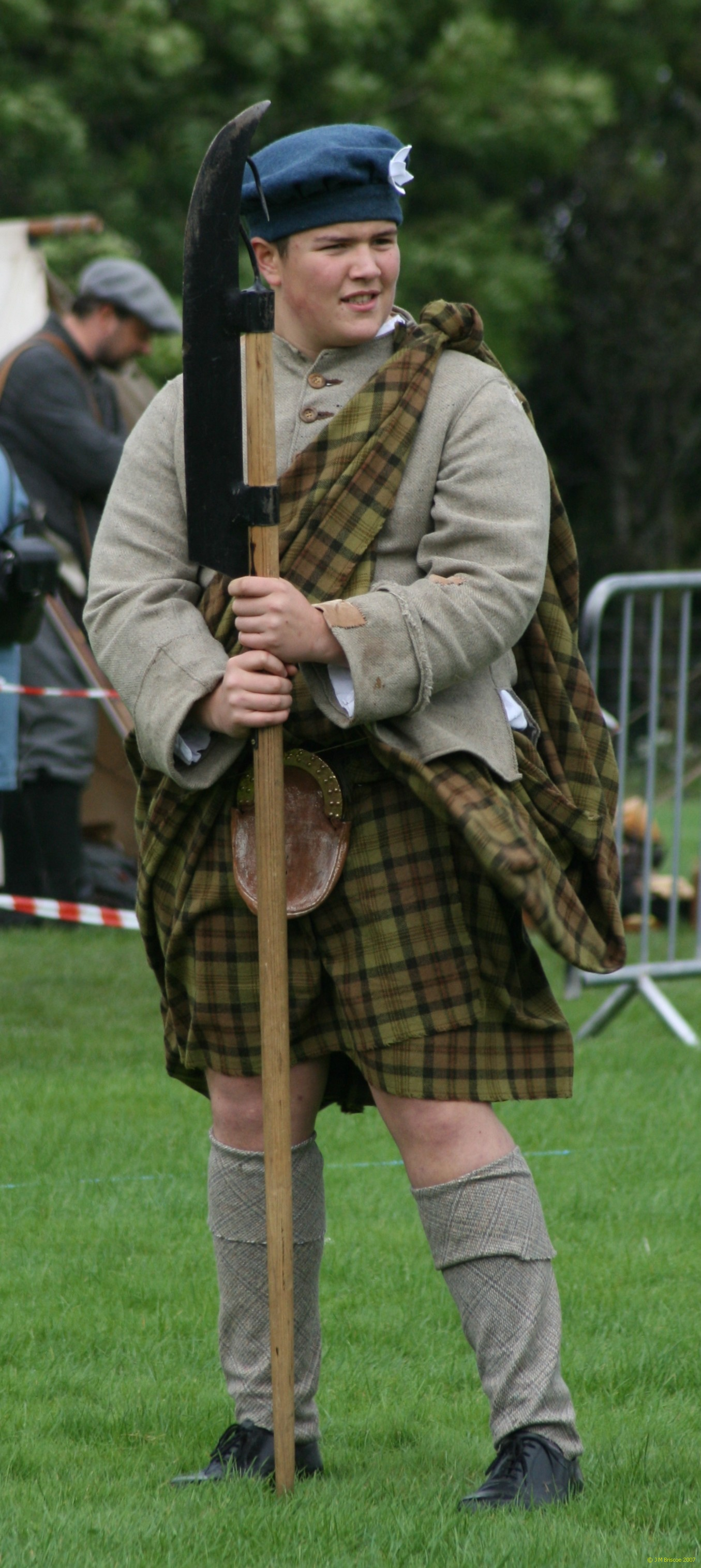
Replica of a Lochaber axe being demonstrated at a battle re-enactment near Inverlochy Castle

The Lochaber axe (Gaelic: tuagh-chatha) is a type of poleaxe that was used almost exclusively in Scotland. It was usually mounted on a staff about five feet long.

== Design and History ==
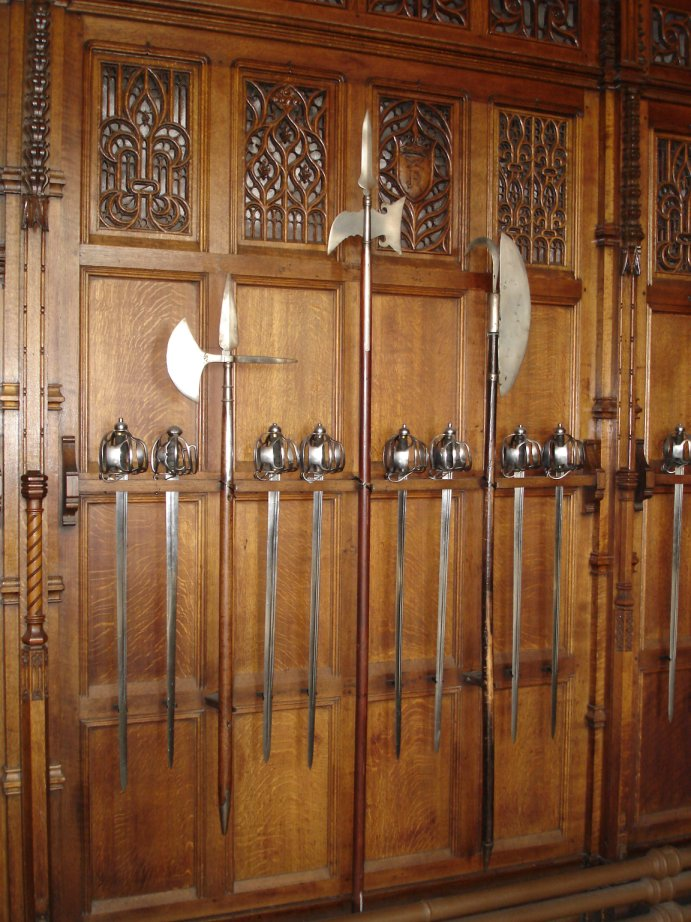
Polearms and basket-hilted swords in the Great Hall of Edinburgh Castle. The polearm on the right is a Lochaber axe; the other two are halberds

The Lochaber axe is first recorded in 1501, as an "old Scottish batale ax of Lochaber fasoun".

The weapon is very similar to the Jedburgh axe, although the crescent blade of the former is larger and heavier than that of the latter. The Lochaber axe took many incarnations, all of them having a few elements in common. It was a heavy weapon, used by infantry against cavalry and infantry.

Like most other polearms of the time, it consisted of two parts: shaft and blade. The shaft was usually some five or six feet (1.5 or 1.8 m) long. The blade was about 18 inches (46 cm) in length which usually resembled a bardiche or voulge in form. The blade might be attached in two places for stability. In addition a hook (or cleek) was attached to the back of the blade. A butt spike was included as a counterweight to the heavy axe head. Langets were incorporated down each side of the shaft to prevent the head from being cut off.

The Lochaber axe had the virtue of being a cheap weapon that could be easily made by a blacksmith. They could be used to arm men who lacked a broadsword or a firearm. Hundreds were hastily made to equip the Earl of Mar's levie troops during the Jacobite rising of 1715. A few were carried by Jacobite troops during the early part of the Jacobite rising of 1745. Although by the end of the rising, almost all Jacobites were armed with muskets and bayonets.

== Use ==
The axe on the side, coupled with the long pole, delivered a powerful blow to infantry or dismounted cavalry. The example in the Edinburgh Great Hall Museum shows a substantial rear-facing hook, for catching/pulling.

For Lochaber axes used by the city guards of Edinburgh, the hook is almost level with the top of the staff, making them useless as a means to catch a moving object. These hooks, however, may have been used to hang the weapons in the guard room.

== See also ==
- Bardiche
