= Voulge =

Medieval European polearm

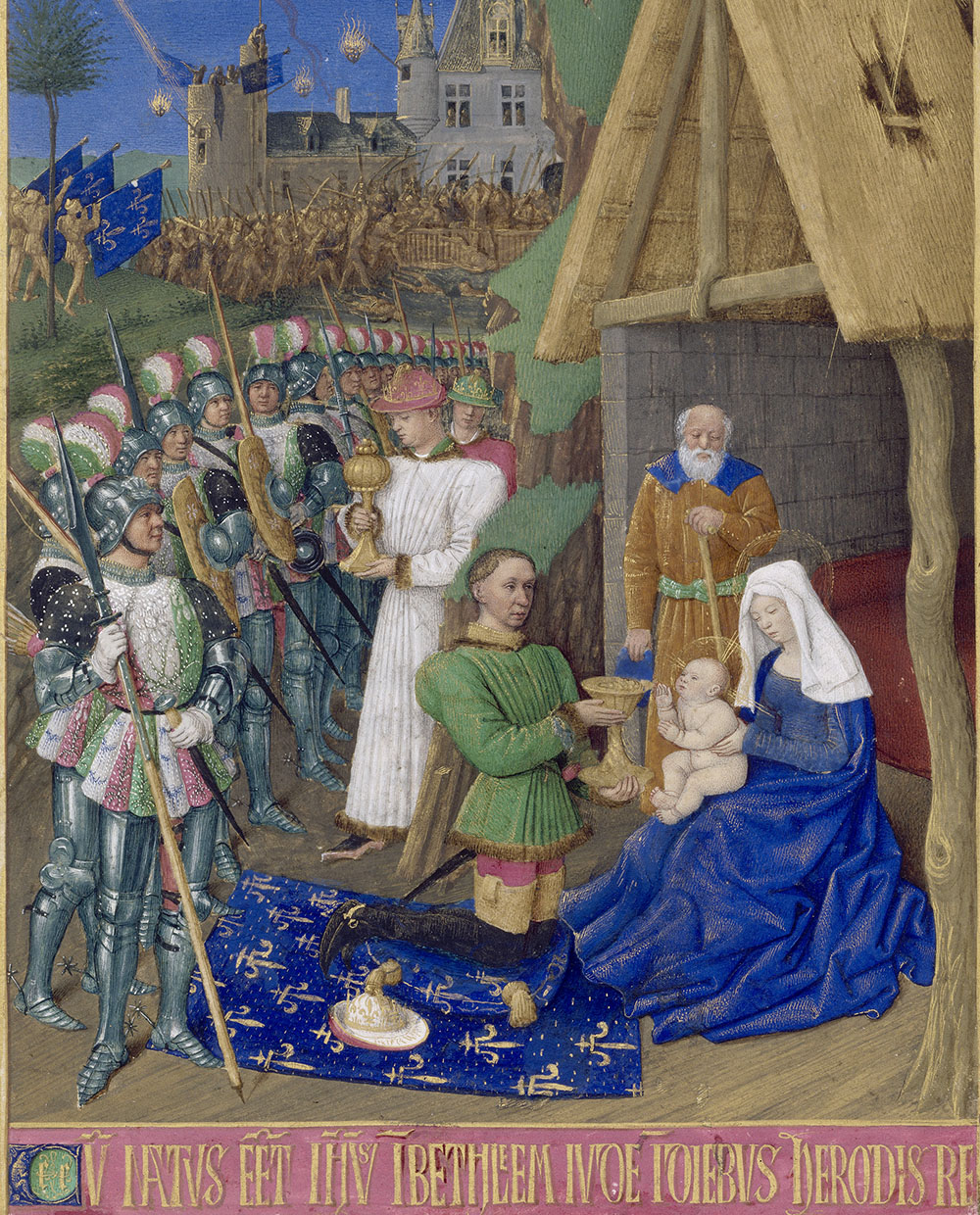
The Adoration of the Magi from the Livre d'heures d'Étienne Chevalier 1455). The leftmost character is holding a voulge

A voulge (/vuʒ/; also spelled vouge or wouge) (Note: French: couteau de brèche, German: kuse, Italian: coltello da breccia) is a type of polearm that existed in medieval Europe, primarily in 15th-century France.

== Description ==
A voulge would usually have a narrow single-edged blade (sometimes with a secondary edge on the back) mounted with a socket on a shaft. The weapon could additionally feature shaft reinforcements called langets and rondel protection for the hands at the base of the blade. Troops that used the weapon are called voulgiers. It is a weapon noted to have been used by the franc-archers and is also depicted in artwork of their creation.

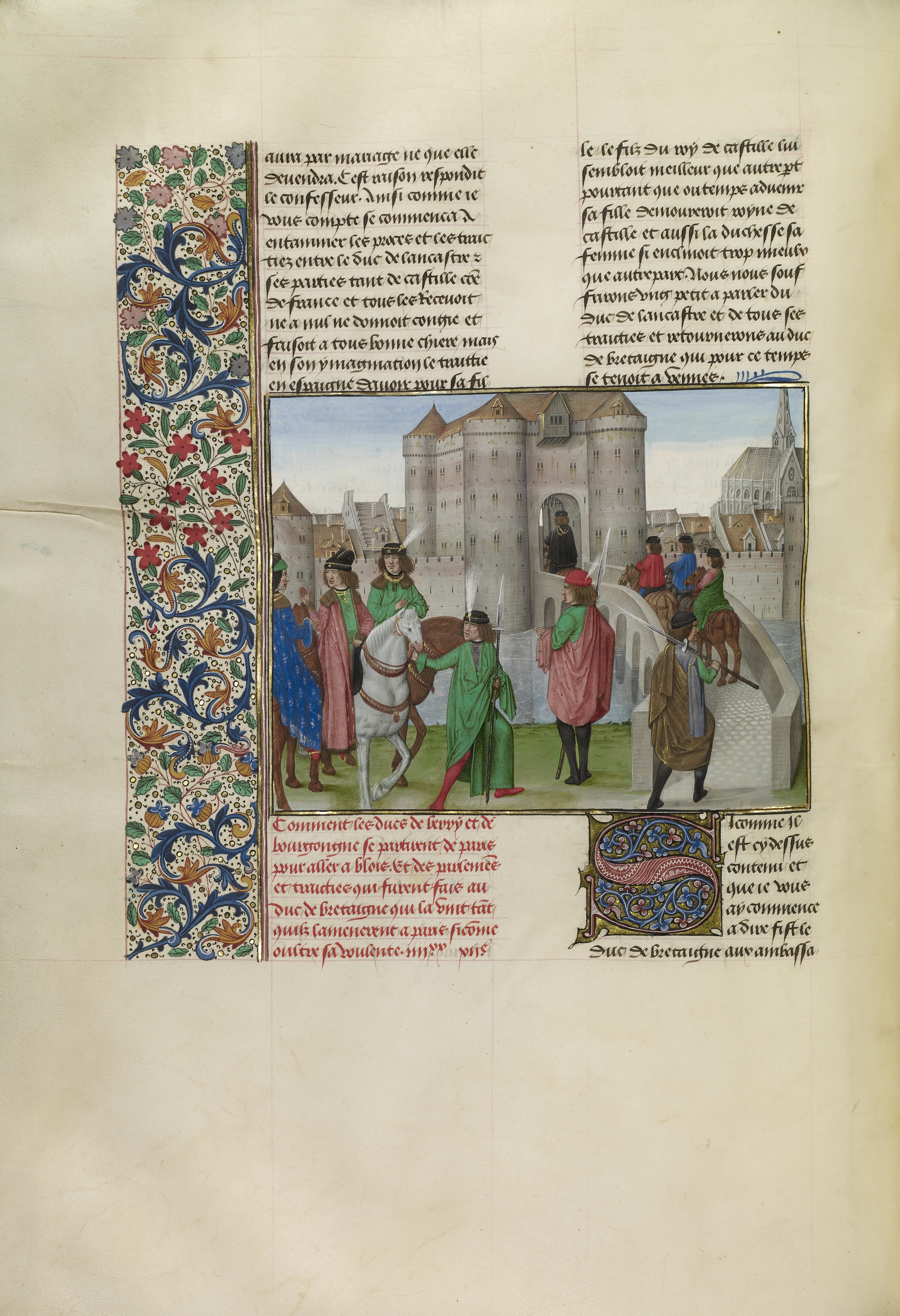
Late XV century depiction of men on foot holding voulges from the Chroniques de Froissart

There is a popular erroneous definition of the word voulge in modern times, which refers to a pointy cleaver-like weapon blade attached to the shaft with two hoops like a bardiche. This definition is incorrect and started in the 19th century with Viollet le Duc, and the weapon in question is an early form of halberd.

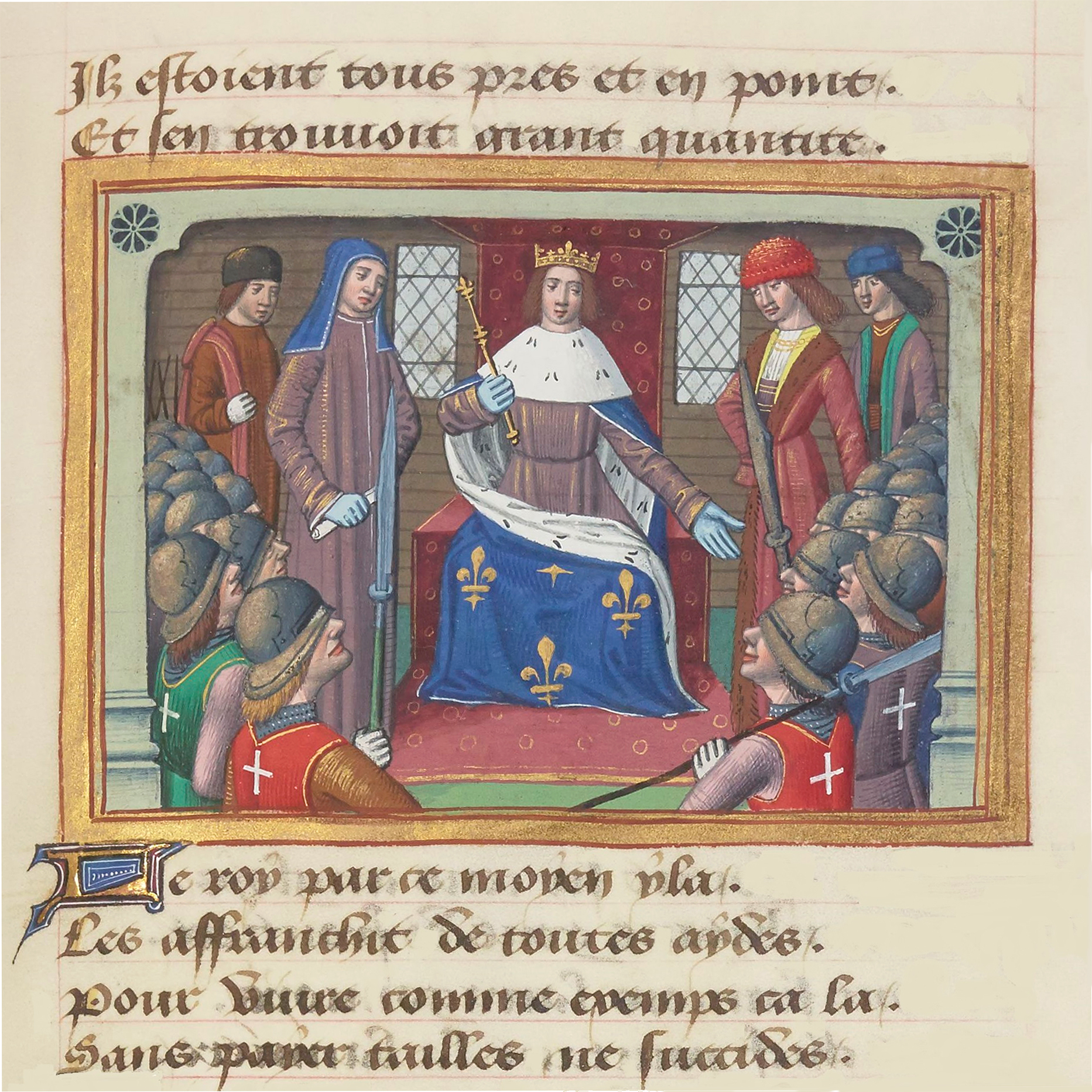
Voulges depicted in the hands of franc-archers

== See also ==
- Lochaber axe
- Bill (weapon)

== Works cited ==
- Waldman, John (2005). Hafted Weapons in Medieval and Renaissance Europe The Evolution of European Staff Weapons between 1200 and 1650. Leiden: Brill. doi:10.1163/9789047407577. ISBN 978-90-474-0757-7. OCLC 704633881.
