= History of Bogor =

Indonesian city history

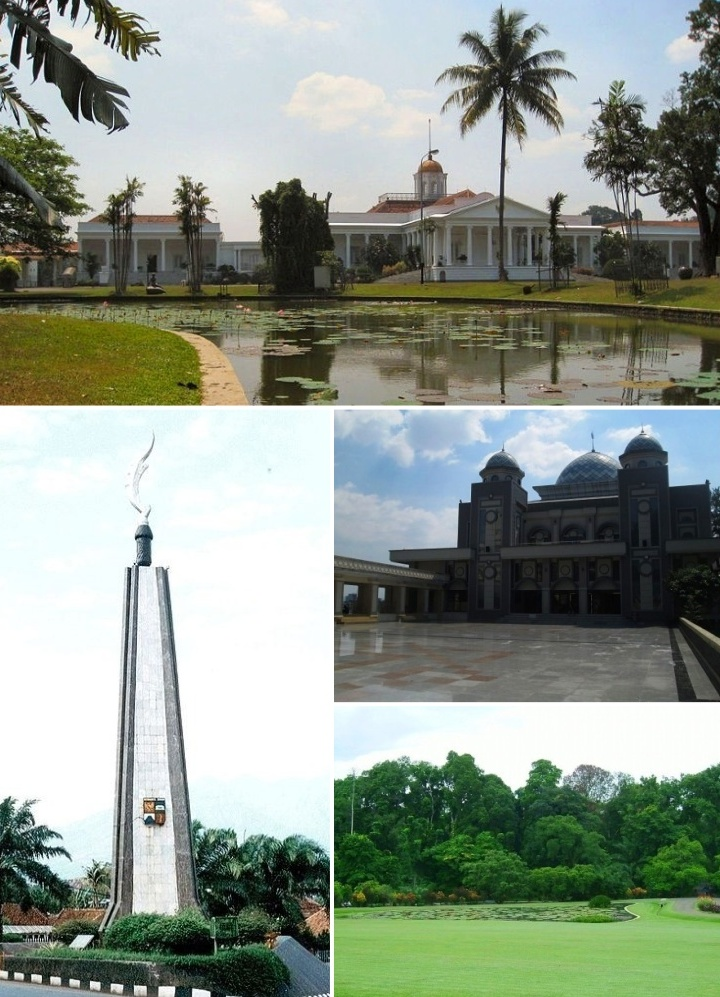
Bogor Palace, Bogor Botanical Garden, Kujang Monument (clockwise from top)

The History of Bogor includes various rulers leading up to the development of the densely populated Indonesian city of Bogor. The City of Bogor (Indonesian: Kota Bogor) was once the capital of Sunda Kingdom (Indonesian: Kerajaan Sunda) and was known as Pakuan Pajajaranknown. When the Dutch took over, the town was included in an administrative division known as Buitenzorg during the Dutch East Indies era. After independence, the city became part of the Bogor Regency. It has its history reflected in its architecture which includes buildings from the colonial, modern, post-modern, and contemporary periods. Bogor is located south of Jakarta on the island of Java, Indonesia. It is known for its Bogor Palace, Bogor Botanical Garden.

The kujang is a traditional weapon of the Sundanese people and is paid tribute by the Kujang Monument.

Buitenzorg was connected to Jakarta by rail in 1872. The town was the capital of an assistant-residency. As of 1894, principal buildings included the Bogor Cathedral, a mosque, a regent's mission, barracks, a prison (built 1848), a bathhouse, a Bogor Botanical Garden (laid out in 1817 by Van de Capellen) and the country palace of the governor-general. Bogor is home to Bogor Agricultural University.

== Colonial era architecture ==
The book "Indische Bouwkunst" lists more than 2000 projects built between 1900 and 1958 – many of which in Buitenzorg, as well as over 150 architects who designed them. This book has been translated into Bahasa Indonesia and is available as a free download.

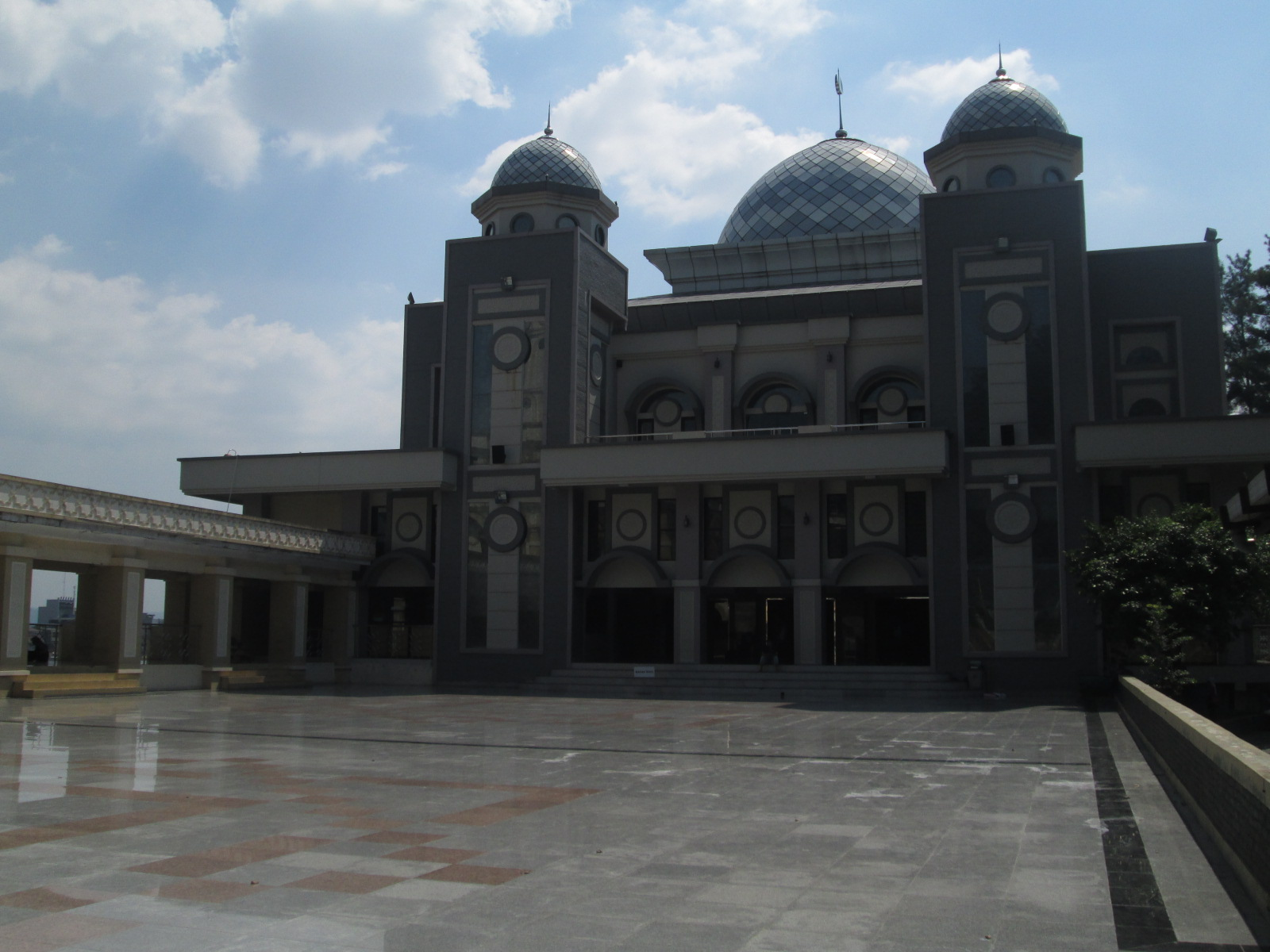
Masjid Raya Bogor

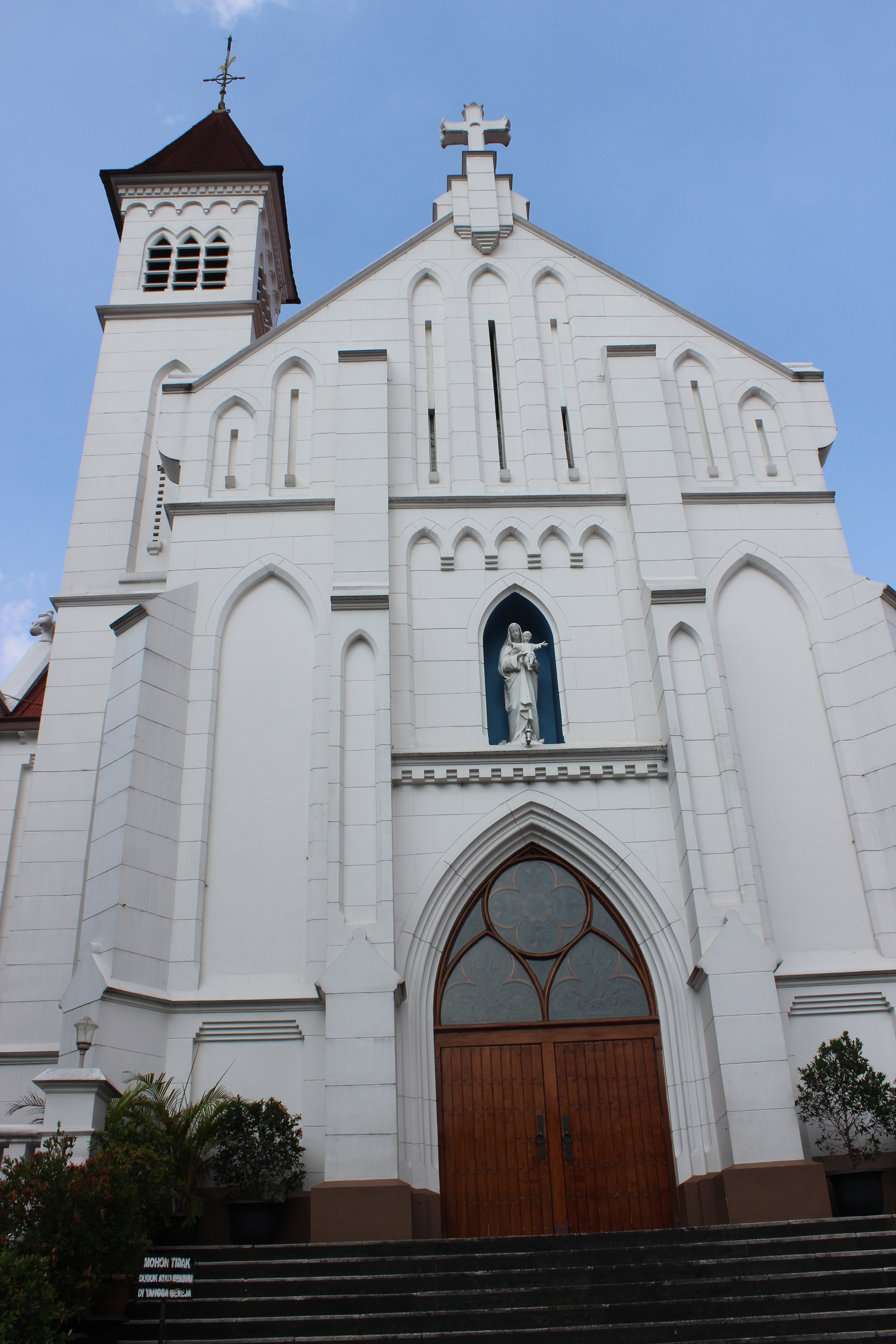
Bogor Cathedral, architect M.J. Hulswit in 1905

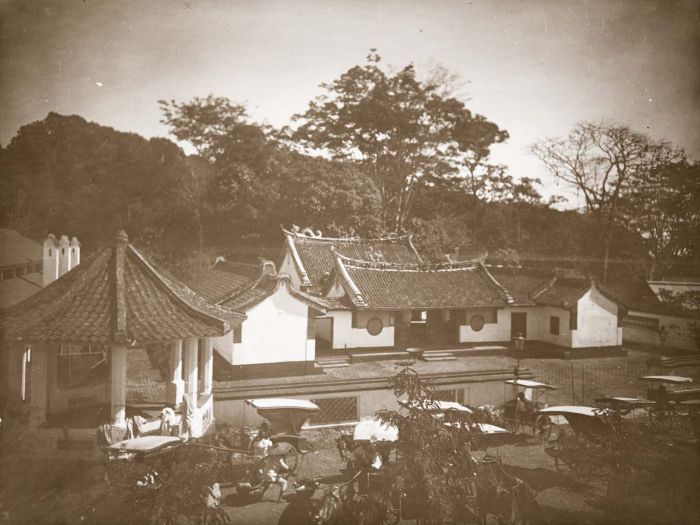
Chinese temple in Buitenzorg

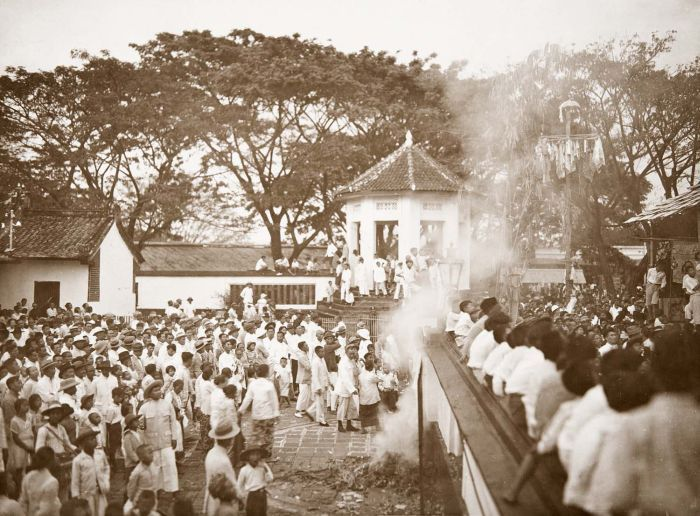
Ceremony at a Chinese Indonesian temple

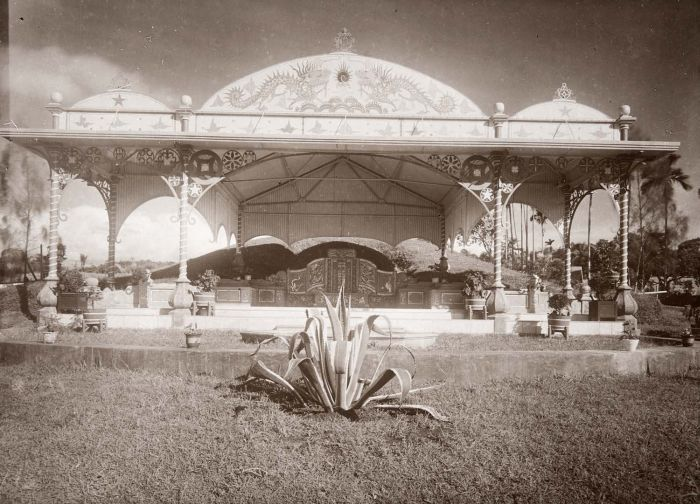
Chinese grave

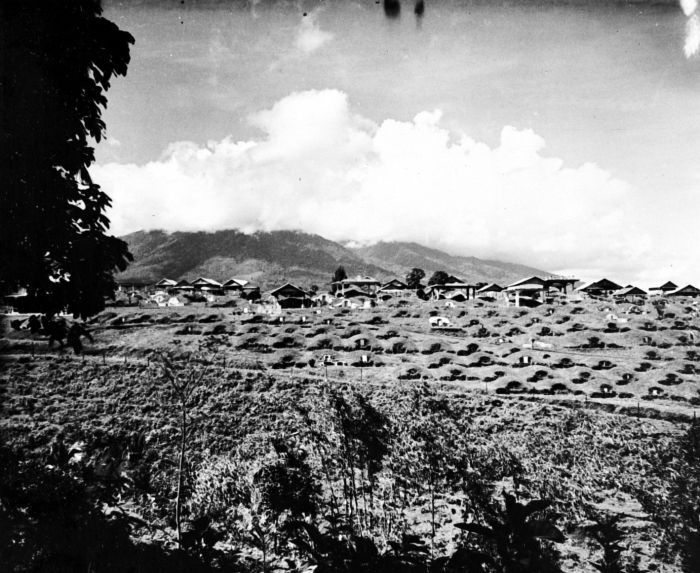
Chinese cemetery in "Soekasari", Buitenzorg

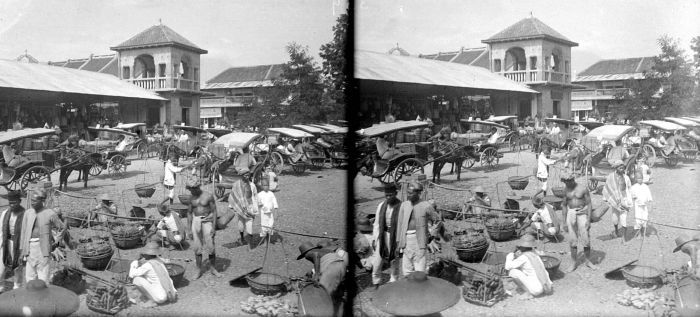
Market by a Chinese temple in Buitenzorg

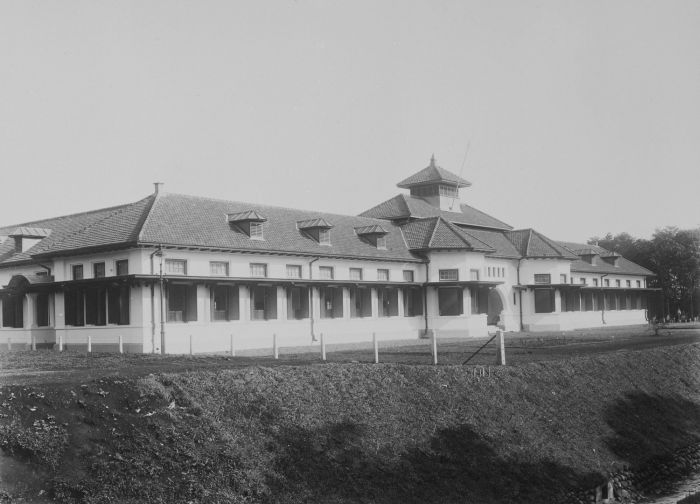
"High Agricultural School" (De Middelbare Landbouwschool), architect J. van Hoytema in 1915

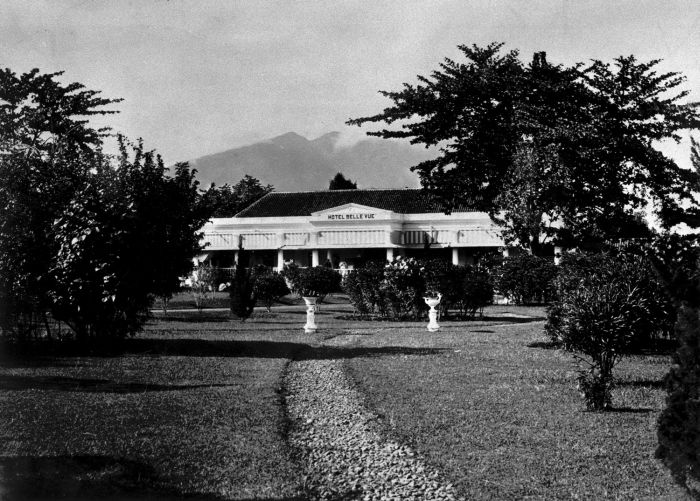
Hotel Bellevue circa 1885

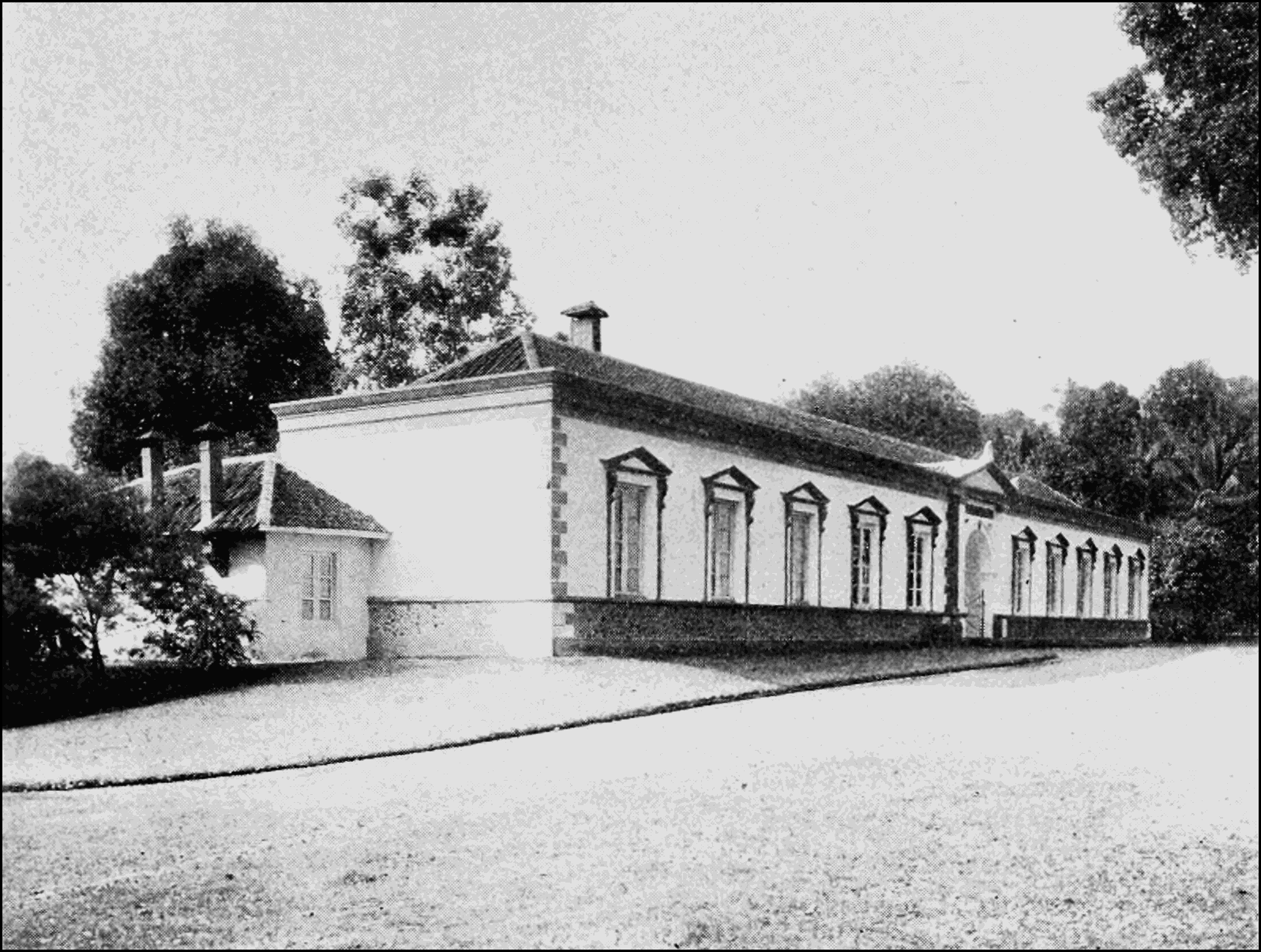
Botanical research laboratory (1905)

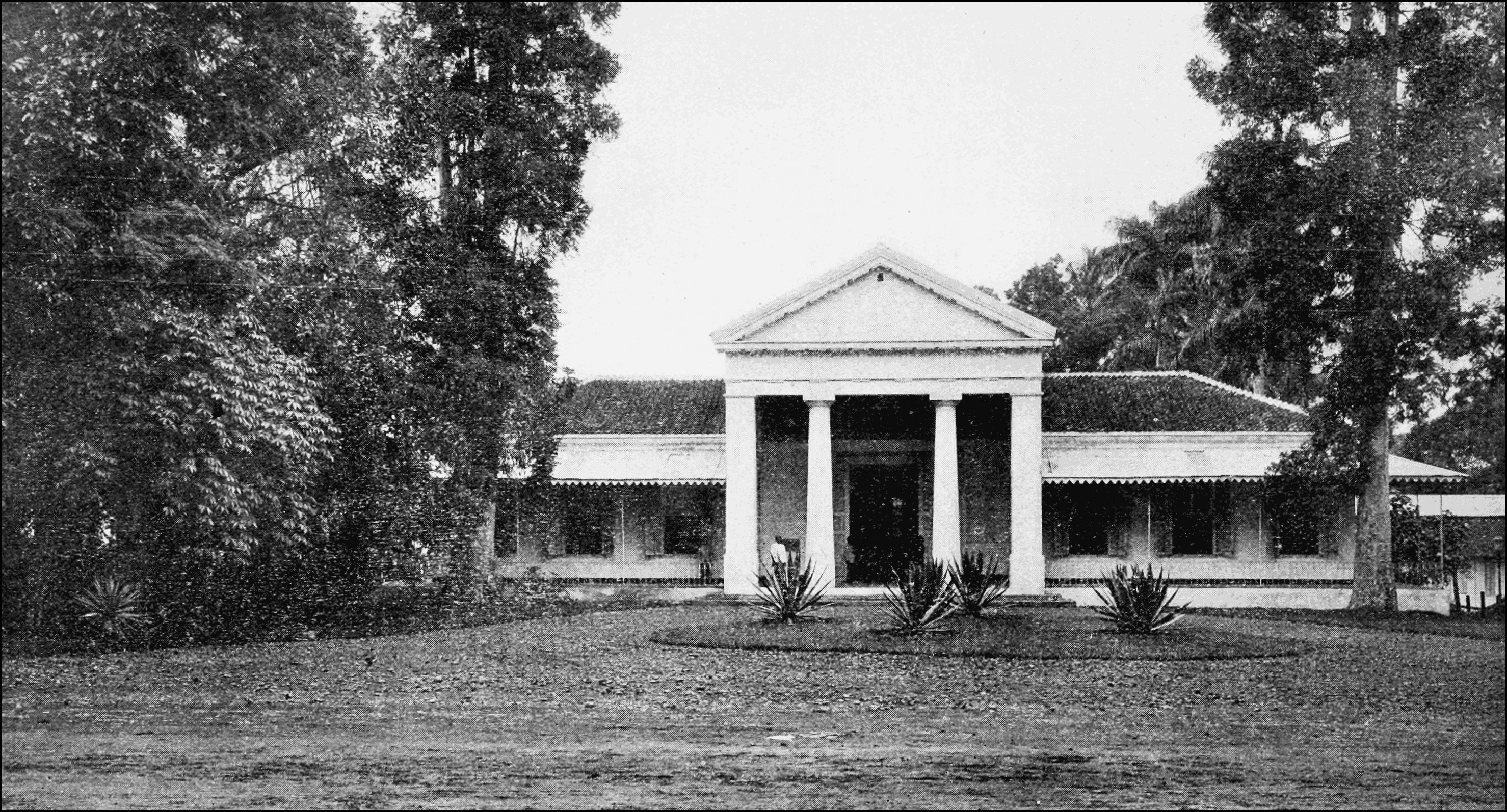
Herbarium and botanical museum at Buitenzorg Institute (1905)

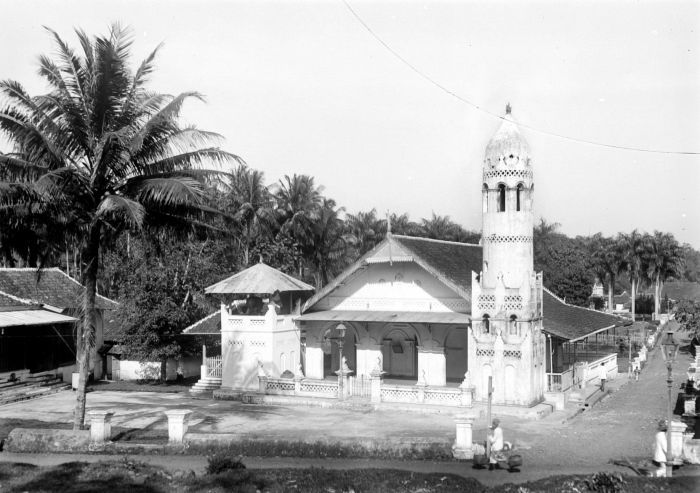
Mosque

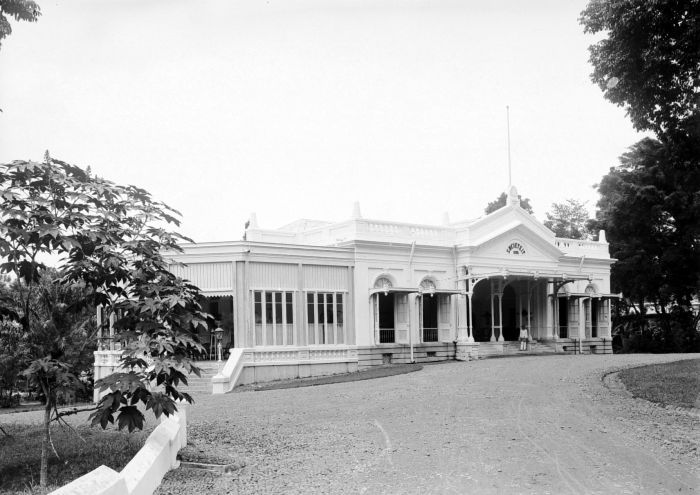
Social club (Sociëteit)

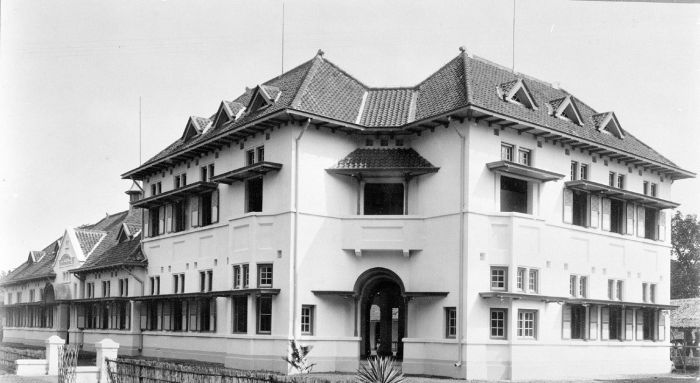
Katrini School architect W. van Bitterswijk (opened 1918)

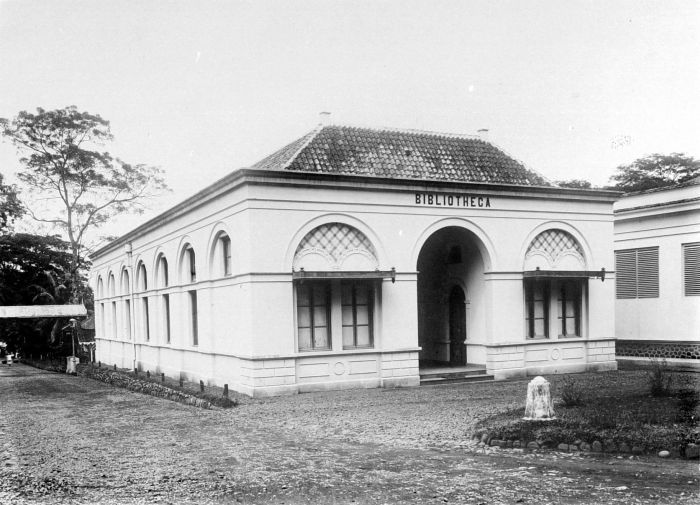
Library at the Bogor Botanical Gardens

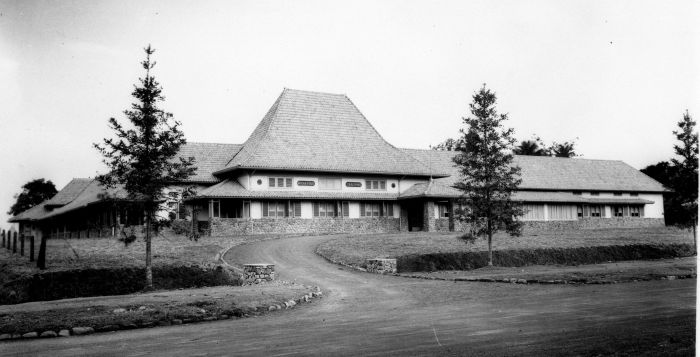
European section of the Buitenzorg Red Cross Hospital circa 1930, architect Th. Karsten.

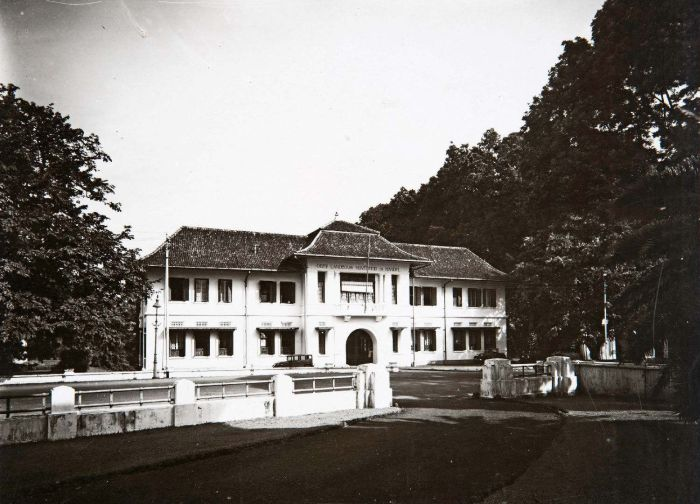
Department of Agriculture, Industry and Trade. Architect S. Snuijf in 1913.

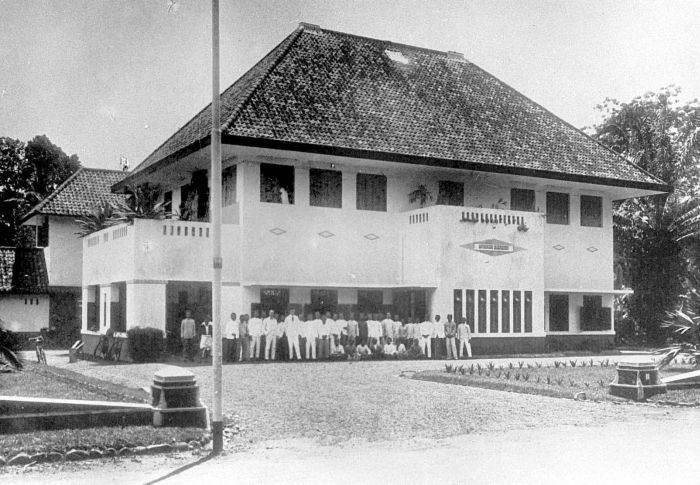
Headquarters of the Buitenzorg People's Credit Bank (Hoofdkantoor van de Buitenzorg Volkscredietbank) op Java met links beneden de wachthal voor klanten en op de bovenverdieping de woning van de administrateur TMnr 10001478.jpg

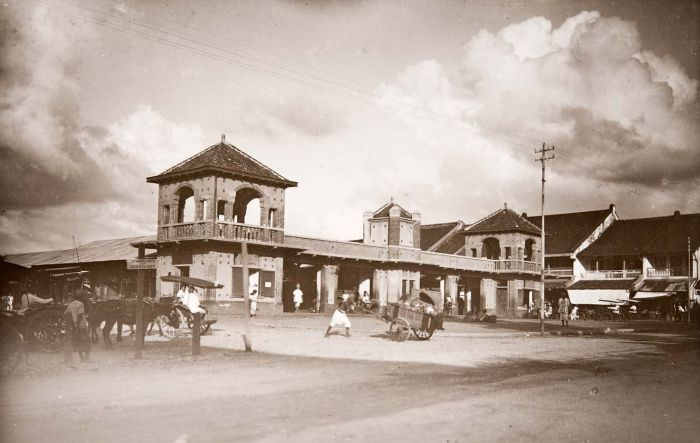
Buitenzorg Market

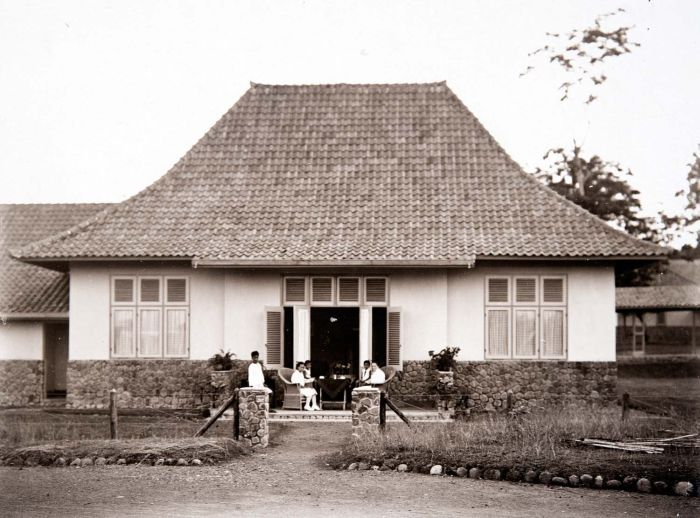
Nurses house at the Red Cross Hospital

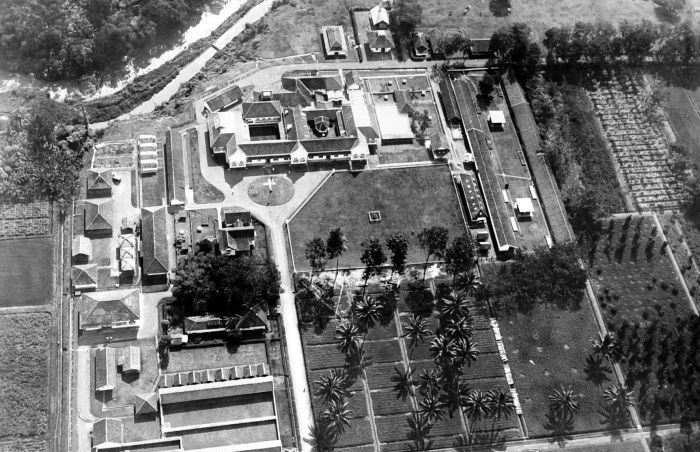
Aerial photo of the Institute of Buitenzorg

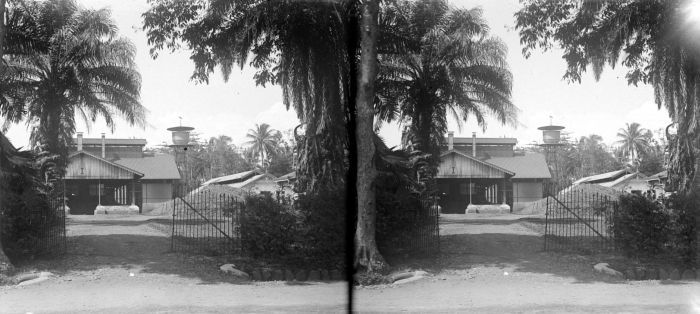
Gasworks (early 20th century)

== Postmodern and contemporary architecture ==
Contemporary architecture projects have included the Wood Box House (2009) and Sekolah Bogor Raya (Bogor Raya School) (2012) by Indra Tata Adilaras.

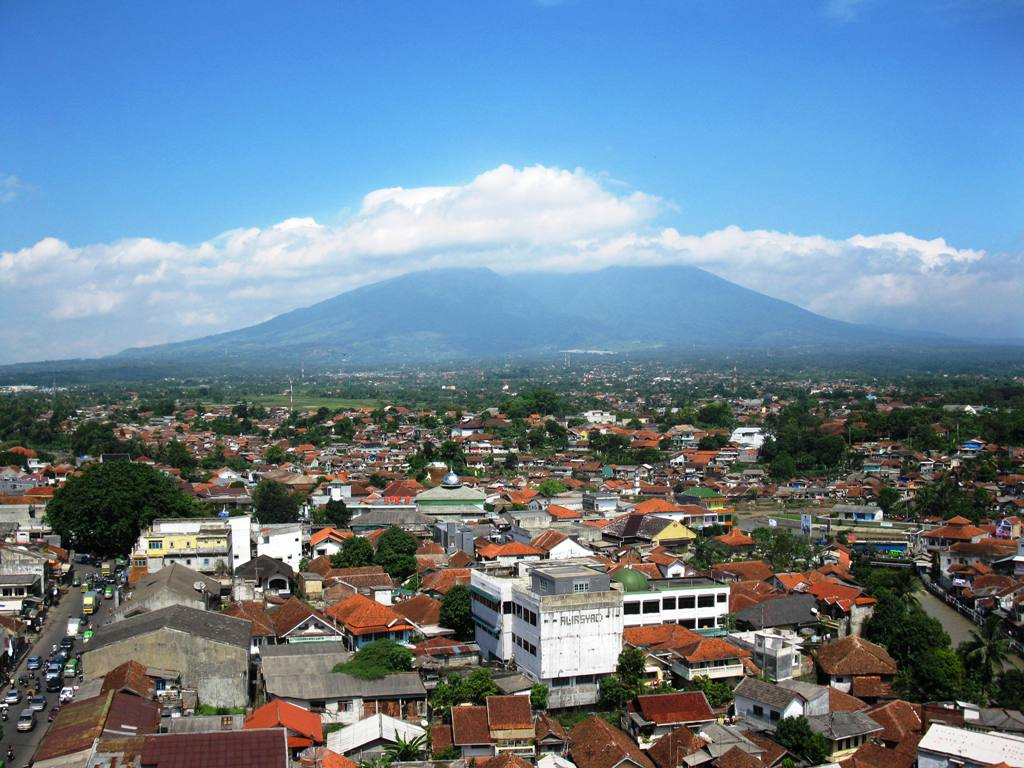
The City of Bogor with Mount Salak (Gunung Salak) in the background

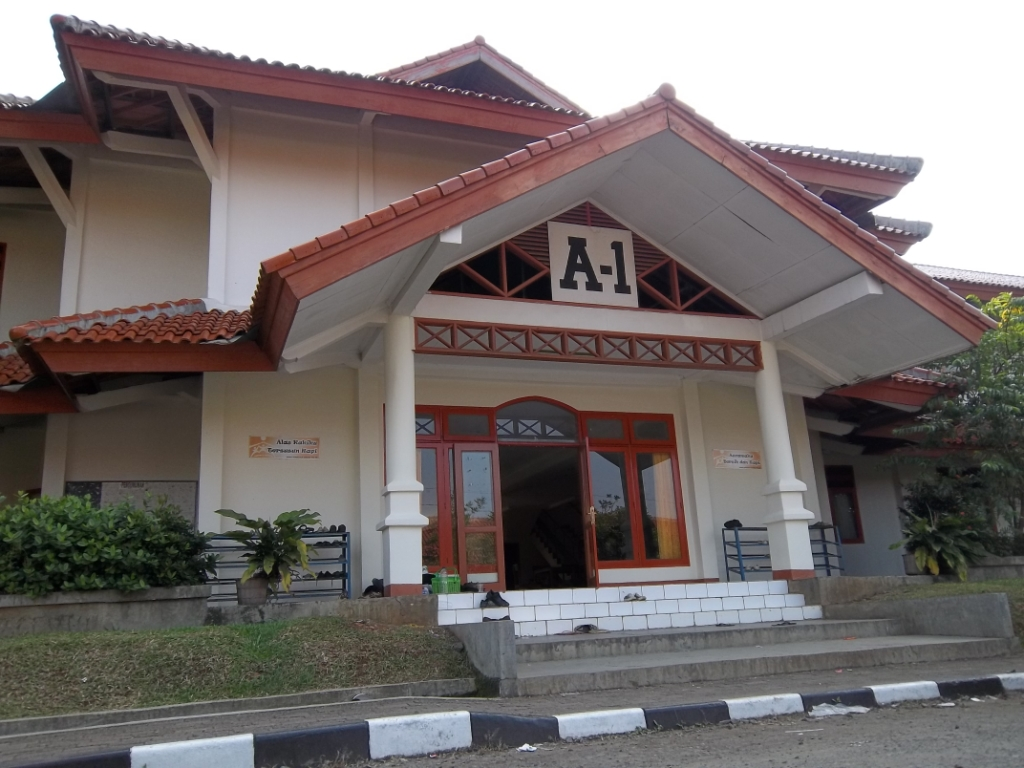
Dormitory at Bogor Agricultural University (Asrama Tingkat Persiapan Bersama IPB)
