= Kudi (knife) =

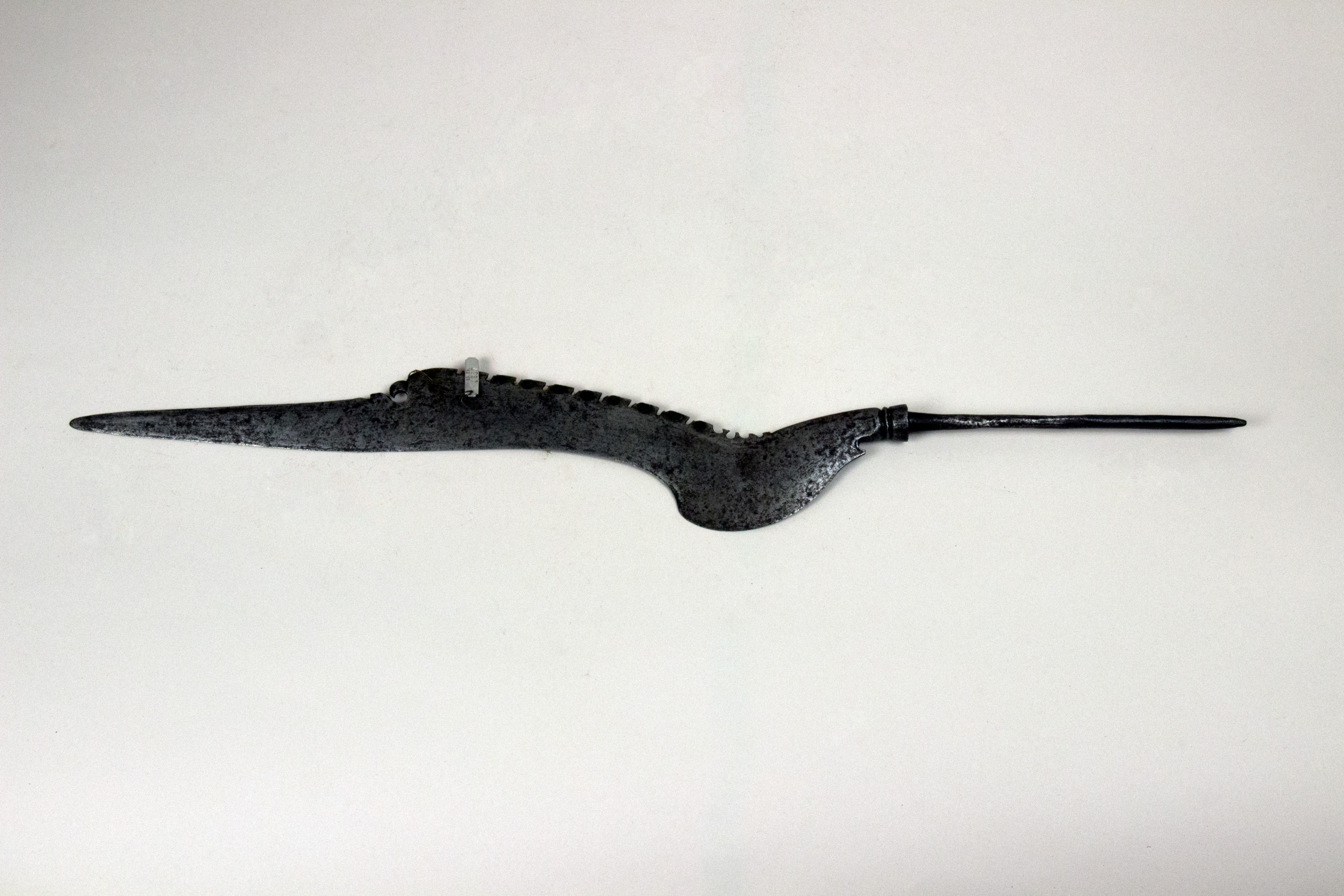
- Kudi Tranchang (or Kudi Rancang), a talisman kudi with elaborate blade.
- Type: Billhook-Axe hybrid
- Place of origin: Indonesia (Central Java) Banyumas

Service history
- Used by: Banyumasan people

Specifications
- Length: 30–60 cm (12–24 in) (blade), up to 180 cm (71 in) (handle)
- Blade type: Single edge, convex grind
- Hilt type: Wooden
- Scabbard/sheath: Wooden

A kudi or kudhi is a bladed tool from Banyumas, Indonesia.

== Description ==
Like a parang, a kudi only has one sharp edge, however, it has a rather curved shape blade tip like a sickle, with an enlarged base. Similarly to the parang, kudi can be used to chop or cut wood and bamboo. Kudi with a slimmer blade may be used as a weapon. The hilt is usually made of wood that is at least as long as the blade. Some kudi blades are also fitted to a spear handle. In spear form, the length of the handle is usually between 65–180 cm (26–71 in).

== Culture ==
The kujang is often considered a development of the kudi. It is said that the word "kujang" came from "kudi hyang" (Gods' kudi). Banyumas version of Bagong puppet figures, called Bawor, depicted carrying a kudi (called curiga) as a weapon. Kudi is considered one of the cultural identities of the Banyumas people. The kudi is typically worn as part of the Banyumasan traditional attire by girding on the back of the waist.

== Images ==
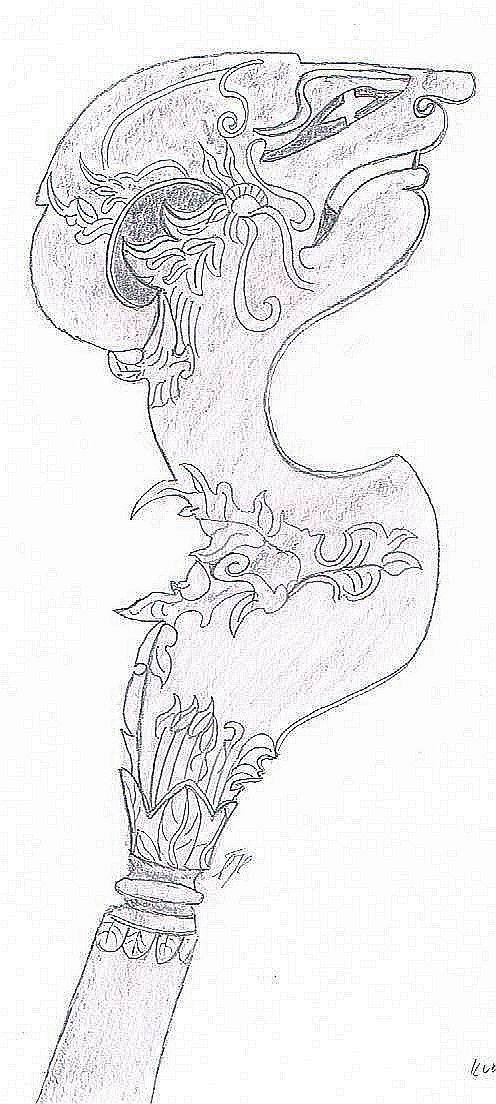
Kudi Wayang, kudi with blade shaped like a wayang puppet figure.

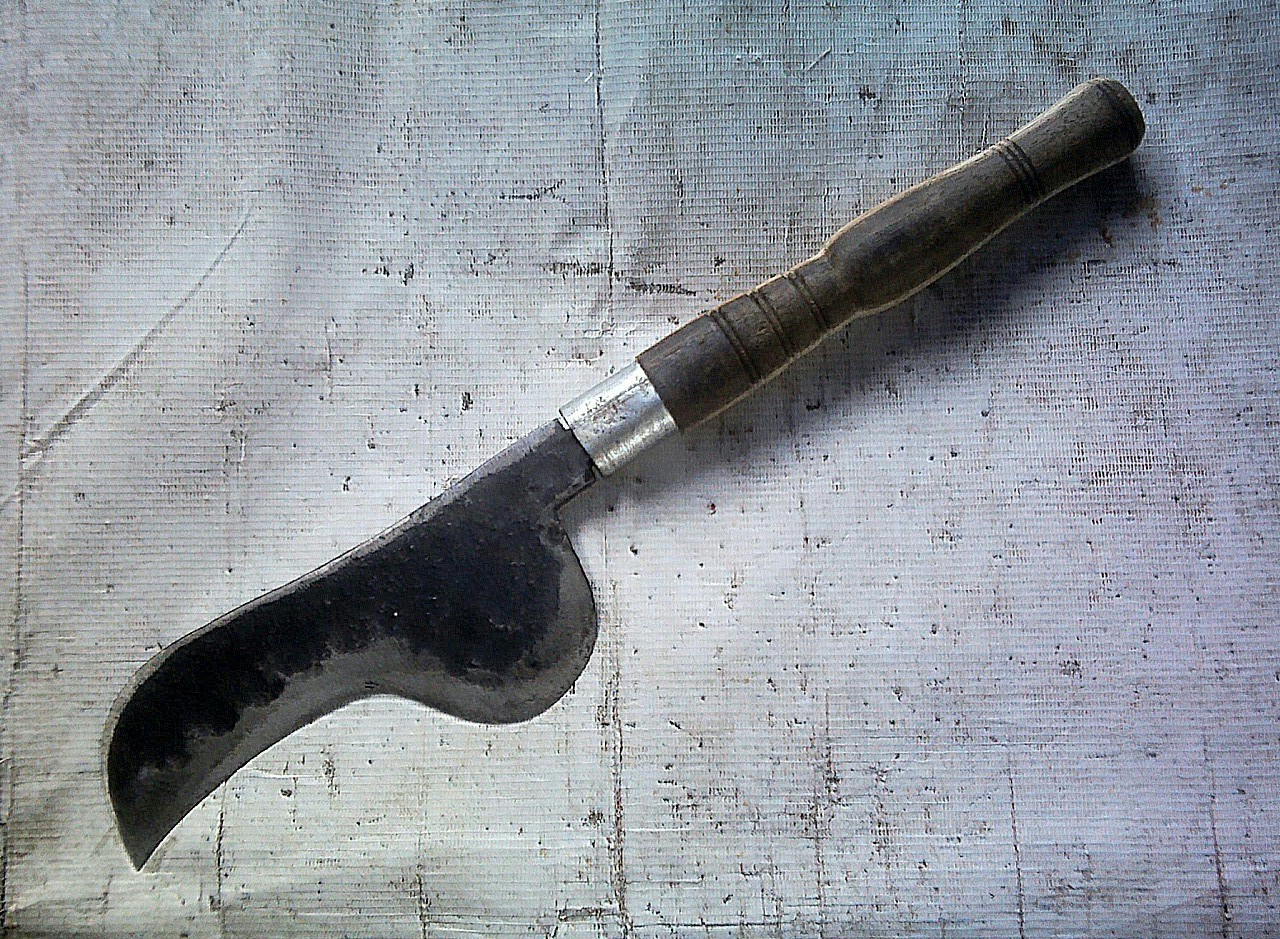
Common Banyumasan kudi.

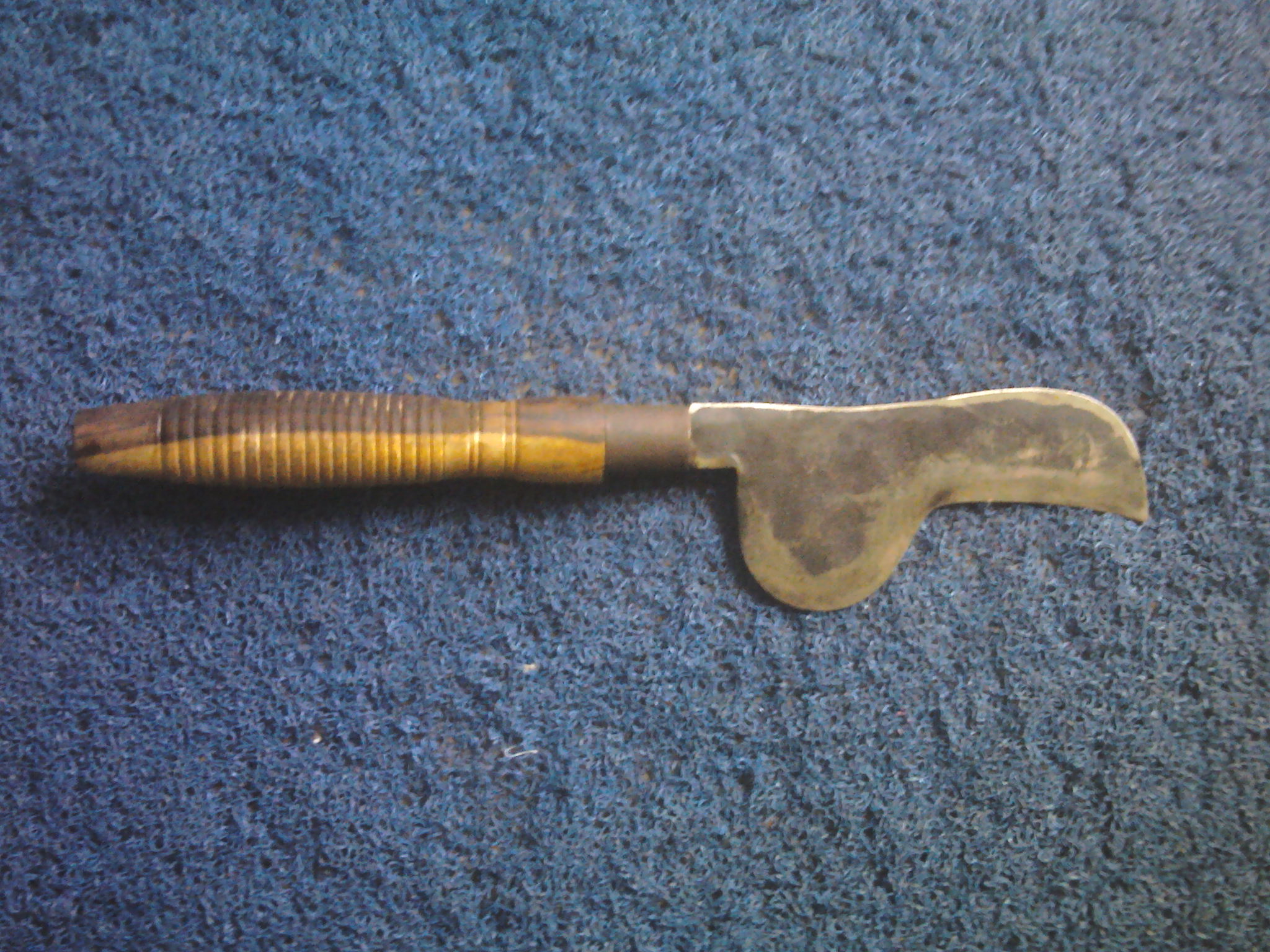
Common Banyumasan kudi.

== See also ==
- Keris
- Celurit
