= Bill (weapon) =

Polearm weapon used by infantry in medieval Europe

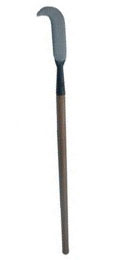
A common variety of bill. Some variants have projections on the backs of the main blades.

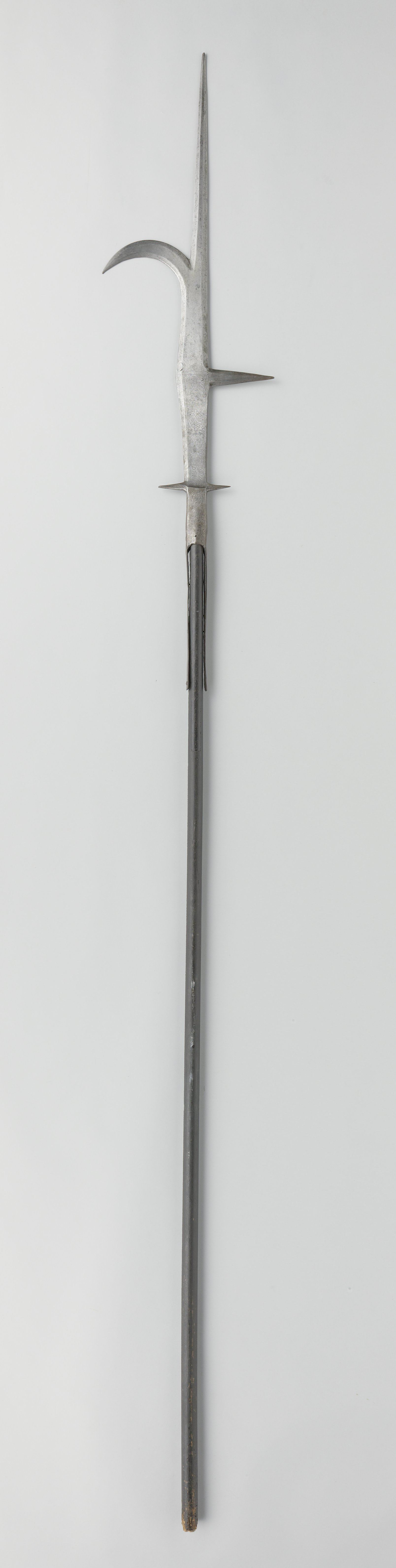
An Italian bill (roncone) with a spike and a hook

A bill is a class of infantry polearm developed from the billhook, an agricultural implement used for trimming tree limbs. Billhooks were adapted to military use through addition of various projecting blades.

In English, the term 'Italian bill' is applied to the similar roncone or roncola, but the Italian version tended to have a long thrusting spike in addition to the cutting blade. 16th and 17th century English texts and inventories distinguished among several varieties of bill, including the black, brown and forest bills, but the differences between them are currently not fully understood. Other variants include the bill hook and bill-guisarme.

Along with the longbow, the bill is often associated with late medieval English armies of the Hundred Years' War and Wars of the Roses.

== Disambiguation ==
The bill is similar in size, function and appearance to the halberd, and might be said to represent convergent evolution to fill a common niche: a polearm with a point to thrust with, a hook to drag with, and a spike/axe to cut with. The bill should not be conflated with a war-scythe, another polearm adapted from an agricultural implement, the scythe.

Bills have been found in Frankish graves from the Merovingian period.

George Silver, writing in 1599, stated that the black bill should be 5 or 6 feet (1.5 or 1.8 m) long, while the forest bill should be 8 or 9 feet (2.4 or 2.7 m).

During the early 16th century, when most European states were adopting the pike and arquebus, the English preferred to stick with the combination of bill and English longbow. Even in the Tudor period, bills were still common with levies sent to fight the Scots. The Battle of Flodden in 1513 was a classic match between continental-style pike formations (Scots) and billmen (English). When the English army fought in the Italian War of 1542–1546, the bill was the main polearm of the English.

The English increasingly transitioned to pike and shot formations from the mid-16th century, but kept the billhook in use in the same capacity as other armies used greatswords and halberds. In 1588, the English trained bands consisted of 36% arquebusiers, 6% musketeers, 16% bowmen, 26% pikemen, and 16% billmen. Lansdowne MS 56, attributed to Lord Burghley, states that ideally infantry formations should consist of 50% shot, 30% pikes, and 20% bills.

Along with the pike, the bill is mentioned as being one of the main weapons of the Irish rebels in Ulster during the 1798 rebellion.

Although obsolete as a military weapon by the 17th century, bills were sent (along with other obsolete arms and armour) to the New World with English colonists to provide defence against Native Americans and Spanish military expeditions. Examples of bills have been excavated at the site of Jamestown, Virginia.

== Variants ==
The shorthanded bills were used by the army of historic India as well, mainly by infantrymen of Bengal.

An agricultural version, commonly known as either a brush-axe, bush-axe, or brush-hook, is readily available in rural hardware and farm-supply stores in the United States today, and is available in the United Kingdom as a "long bill". It has a 4-foot-long (1.2 m) handle, and a 16-inch (41 cm) head. It is useful for clearing undergrowth and unwanted hedgerows. Both the concave and convex edges may be sharpened edges, but spear-points and back-hooks are not available. Expertly used, the brush-axe can fell a 3-inch (7.6 cm) tree with a single blow.

In Brazil, the bill (foice) is a very common tool in rural areas as tool and sometimes as a self-defence weapon.

== See also ==
- Billhook
- Falx
- Siege hook
- Voulge
