= Billhook =

Cutting tool

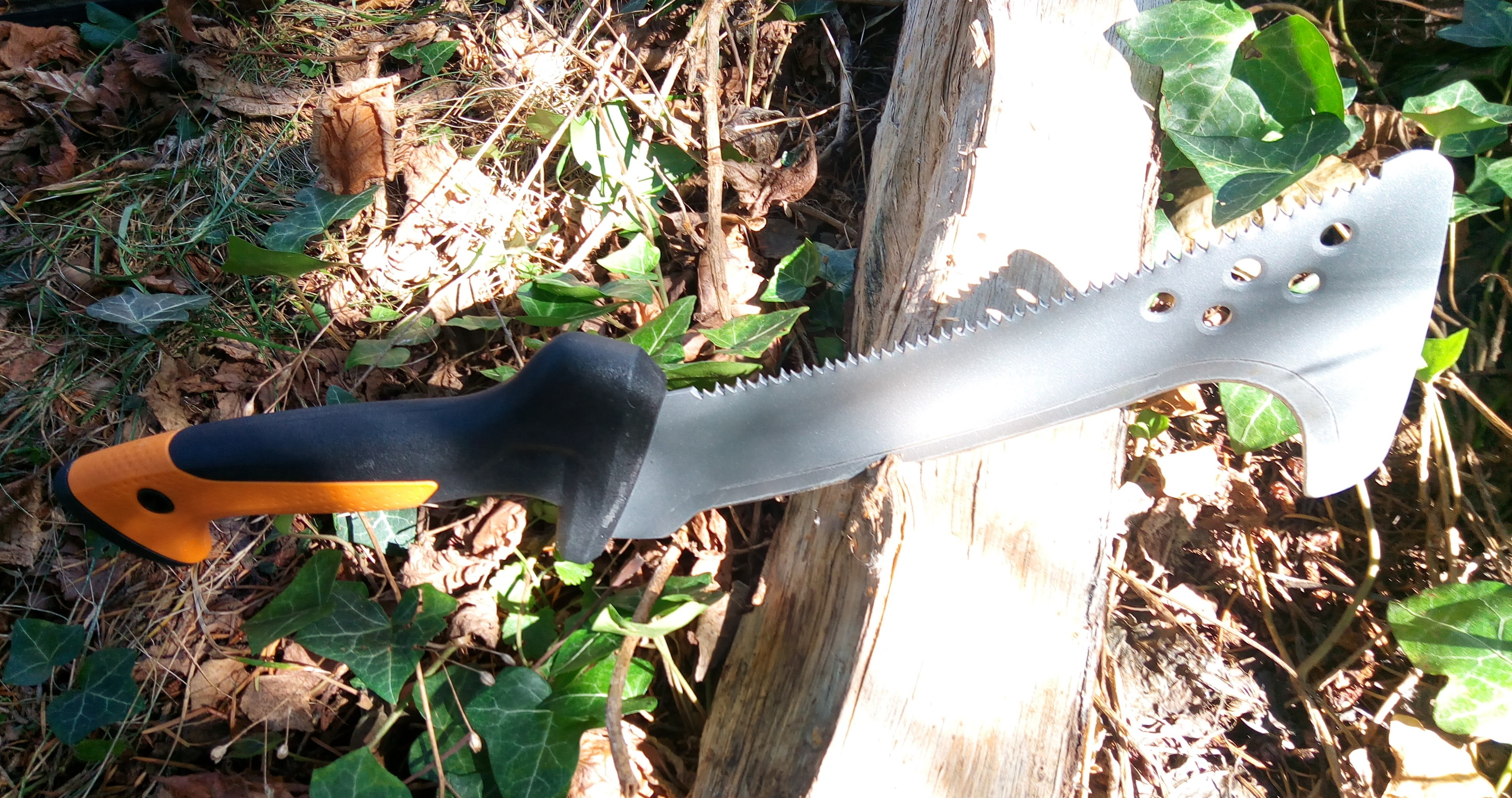
Modern billhook with saw blade, used in bushcraft activities

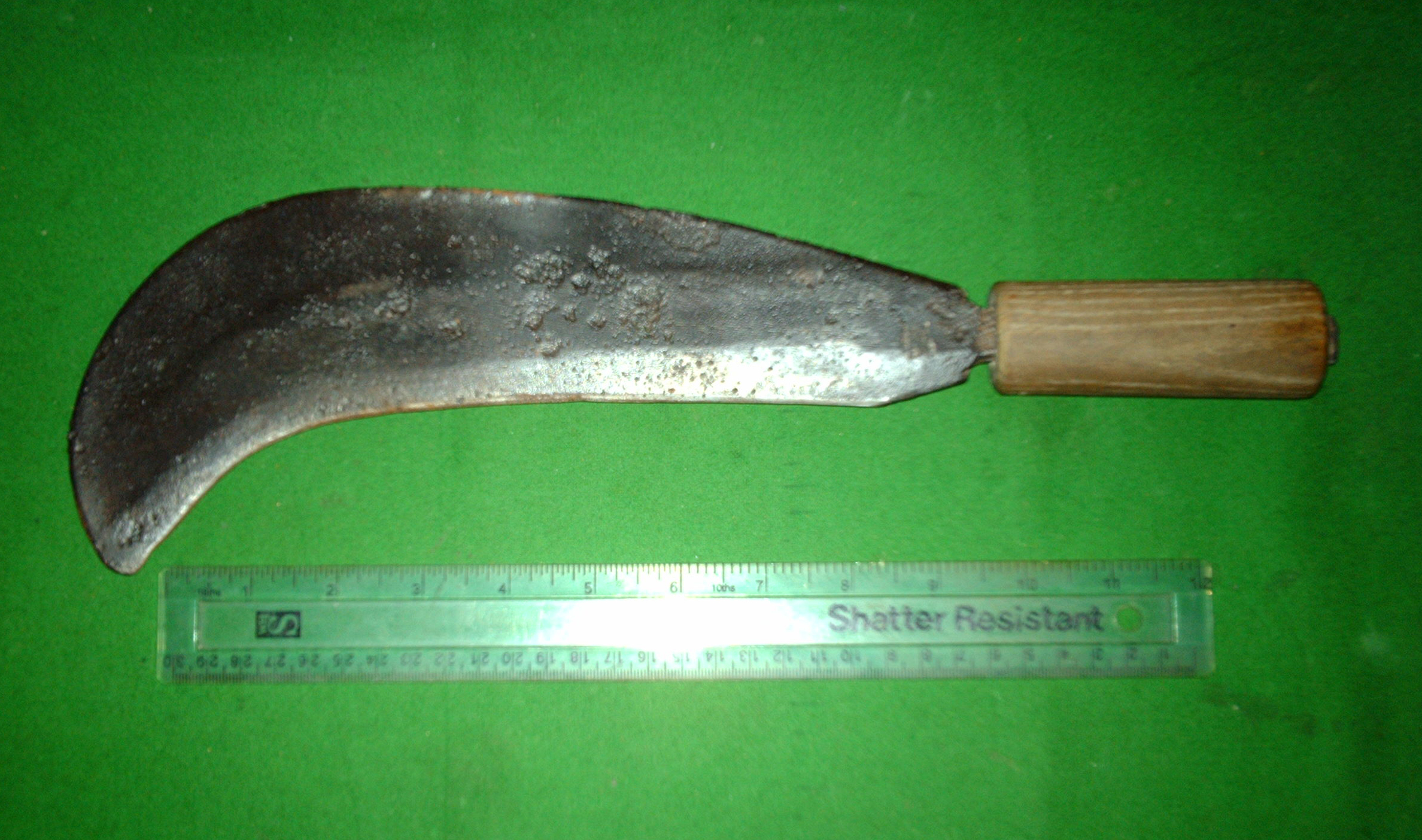
Traditional Devon pattern billhook made by W. Gilpin in 1918; original handle has been replaced. 12-inch/30 cm ruler shown for reference.

A billhook or bill hook (Note: Also called a pruning knife, or spar hook.) is a versatile cutting tool used widely in agriculture and forestry for cutting woody material such as shrubs, small trees and branches. It is distinct from the sickle. It was commonly used in Europe with an important variety of traditional local patterns. Elsewhere, it was also developed locally such as in the Indian subcontinent, or introduced regionally as in the Americas, South Africa, and Oceania by European settlers.

== Design ==
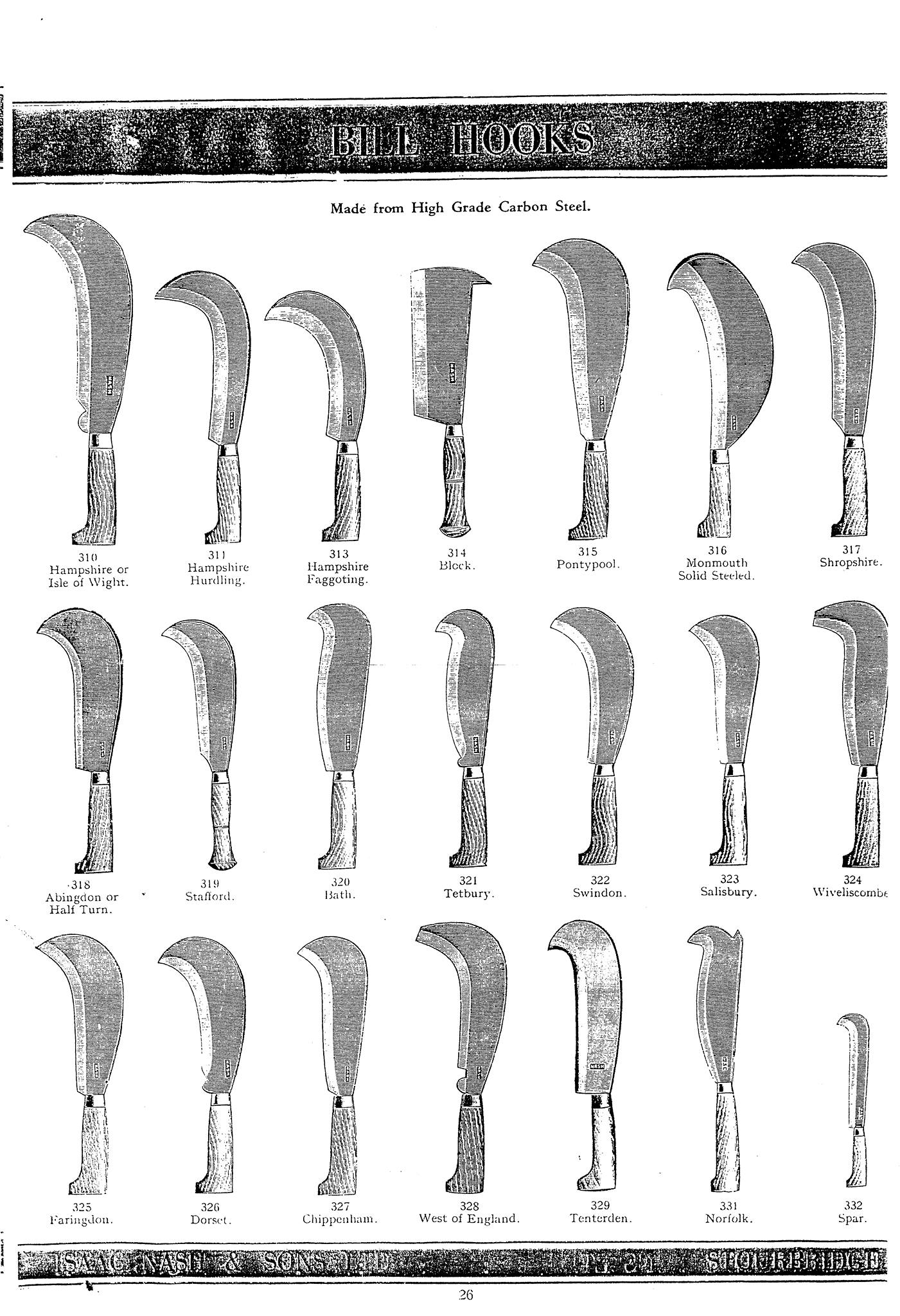
Page from the 1939 Nash–Fussells catalogue, showing a variety of types of bill hook with caulked handles

The blade is usually made from a medium-carbon steel in varying weights and lengths, but typically 20 to 25 centimetres (7.9 to 9.8 in) long. Blades are straight near the handle but have an increasingly strong curve towards the end. The blade is generally sharpened only on the inside of the curve, but double-edged billhooks, or "broom hooks", also have a straight secondary edge on the back.

The blade is fixed to a wooden handle, in Europe usually made from ash due to its strength and ability to deal with repeated impact. Handles are mostly 12 to 15 centimetres (4.7 to 5.9 in) long and may be "caulked" or round. ("Caulked" handles have a knob sticking out on one side at the bottom of the handle, intended to help keep the tool from slipping out of your hand. See sidebar.) Longer handles are sometimes used for heavier patterns, making the tool double-handed. The blade and handle are usually linked by a tang passing through the handle, but sometimes a socket that encloses the blade. Some styles of billhook have scales of hardwood or horn fitted to the handle.

Some billhooks (for example the Kent pattern) have a single-bevelled blade, available in both right- and left-handed versions, others (such as the Machynlleth pattern) have dished blades (concave one side and convex the other), or a pronounced thickened nose (such as the Monmouth pattern). The reasons for many of these variations are now lost.

The use of a billhook is between that of a knife and an axe. It is often used for cutting woody plants such as saplings and small branches, for hedging and for snedding (stripping the side shoots from a branch). In France and Italy it is widely used for pruning grape vines. The billhook is the European equivalent of tools such as machetes, parangs, and kukris. Prior to the advent of chainsaws, billhooks were used to clear brush and undergrowth from around the base of a tree that was to be felled by either axe or crosscut saw.

The billhook's use as a cutting tool goes back to the Bronze Age, and a few examples survive from this period, for example, found in the sea around Greece. Iron examples from the later Iron Age have been found in pre-Roman settlements in several English counties, as well as in France and Germany, where it is called "Hippe" or "Sechsle", and Switzerland, where it is called "Gertel".

The tool has developed a large variety of names in different parts of Britain, including bill, hedging bill, hand bill, hook bill, billhook, billook, brushing hook and broom hook. In American English a billhook may sometimes be called a "fascine knife".

Made on a small scale in village smithies and in larger industrial sites, e.g. Old Iron Works, Mells, the billhook is still relatively common throughout most of western Europe. During the 19th and early 20th centuries the larger manufacturers offered up to 200 or so different regional styles and shapes of blade, sometimes in a range of different sizes from 6 to 11 inches (15 to 28 cm) long in 0.5-inch (1.3 cm) steps. The French firm of Talabot boasted in their 1930 catalogue that they held over 3000 different patterns in their archives.

== Styles ==
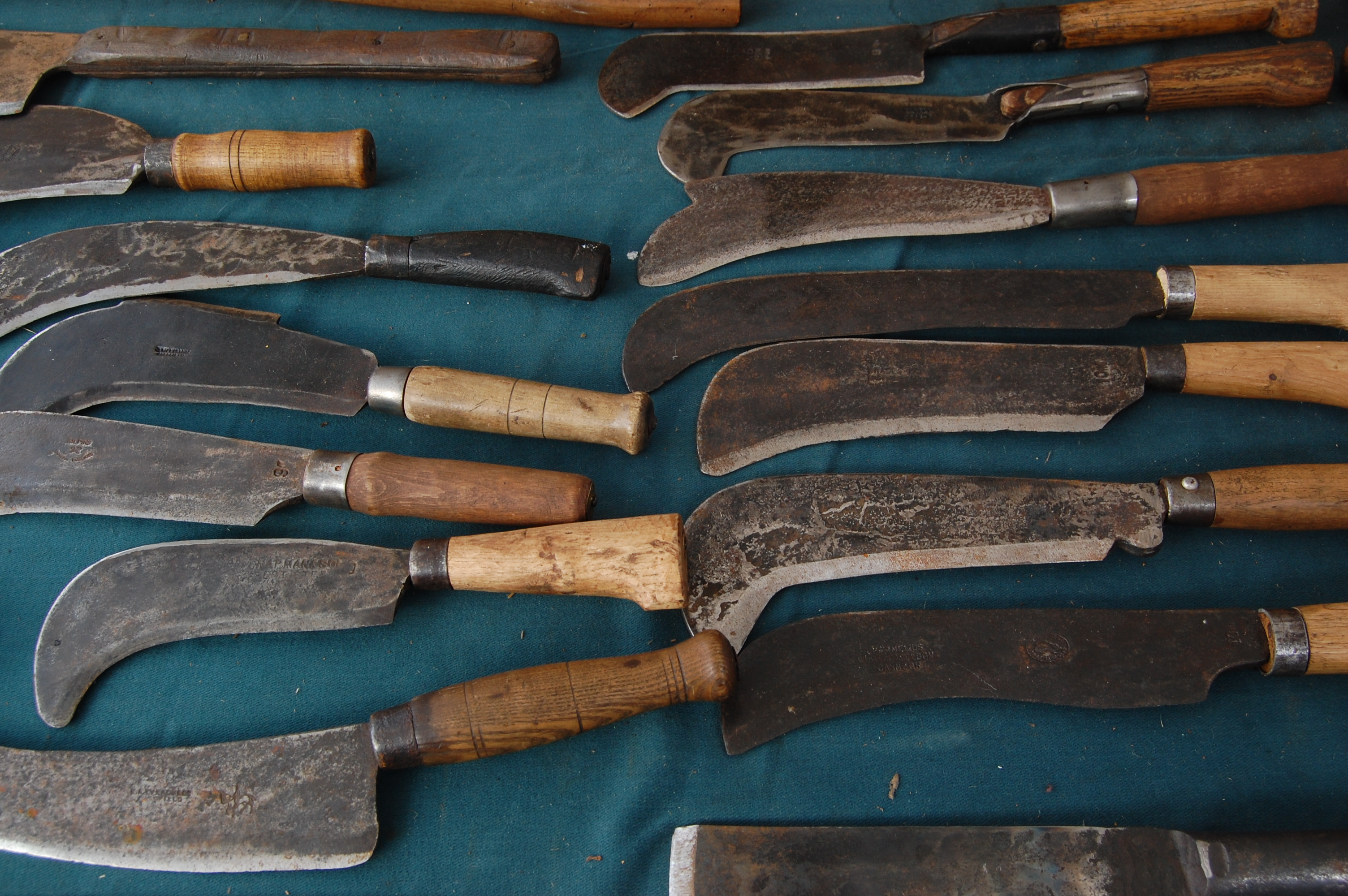
Billhooks for sale at Ludlow market, Shropshire, England

=== Principles of design ===
Billhooks would have once been made by the local smith to the user's specifications but now sizes and shapes are largely standardised. The handles are mostly rat-tail tang, except the Yorkshire having such a long handle that a tang is just not practical – they have a socket instead. The smaller hooks have variations in the shape of the handle: round, oval and pistol-grip.

Billhooks are almost universally made from ordinary steel of a moderate carbon content. High-carbon steel is not often used since an extremely sharp and hard edge is not necessary, and a slightly lower carbon content makes the hook easier to sharpen in the field. Hygiene and cosmetic appearance are unimportant so more expensive stainless steel is not used.

Billhooks have a relatively thick blade since they are typically used for cutting thick and woody vegetation. The nose is sometimes also thickened to bring the sweet spot further forward and to optimise the chopping action. The edge of a billhook is not bevelled to a very narrow angle to avoid binding in green wood.

The hooked front of the blade is designed to prevent the sharpened inner edge from hitting the ground, which would quickly damage or blunt it. Billhooks were the tool of choice for clearing areas of brush and shrubs, since this activity requires chopping close to the ground. In German speaking countries, the billhook is known as a Rodeaxt, which translates to "clearing axe".

A billhook may vary in shape depending from which part of the UK it originates; there are eleven main types.

=== Northern, Midland and Welsh designs (UK) ===
Leicester/Warwickshire
Favoured by Midlands-style hedgers, this is a one handed tool with a 6-inch (15 cm) handle and a 10-inch (25 cm) blade. It has a curved front edge and a shorter straight edge at the back, the front edge being used for general purpose and the back edge kept extremely sharp for delicate trimming, topping off stakes and other work that will not damage the blade.
Yorkshire
Used by a small percentage of Midlands-style hedgers, this is generally a two-handed tool with a 14-inch (36 cm) handle and 10-inch (25 cm) blade; again, it has the curved front and straight back edges. In some cases the handle can be up to 36 inches (91 cm) long. The disadvantage of this variety of tool is its weight.
Llandeilo and Carmarthenshire
Have a 9-inch (23 cm) handle and a 10-inch (25 cm) blade. They lack a back edge, but have a small notch at the top, known as a hedge grip, which allows hedgers to push pleachers and brash into place without using the hands.
Pontypool and Monmouthshire
Have a 6-inch (15 cm) handle and a 10-inch (25 cm) blade, but lack the back edge or the hedge grip of the Llandeilo.
Knighton/Radnorshire
With similar measurements to the Pontypool/Monmouthshire style, this style has the least curvature of any hook and is almost a straight blade.
Newtown/Montgomeryshire
Has slightly more curvature than the Knighton. The top picture shows a Newtown pattern billhook.

=== Southern designs (UK) ===
The southern group of hedgers use hooks often designed for other woodland work besides hedging. They are all single-edged and vary from moderately heavy to very light.

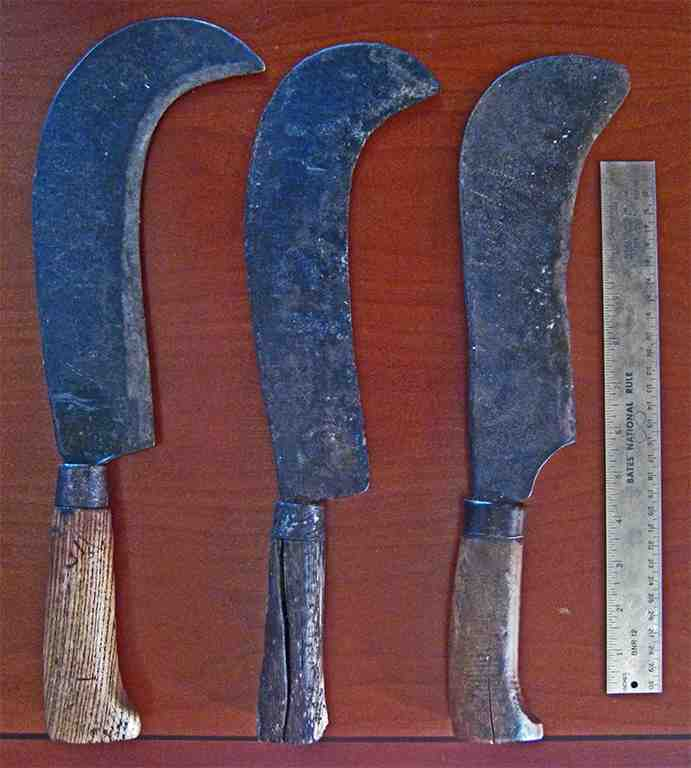
Kentish brishing hooks

Devon/Dorchester half turn
Has a heavily weighted nose, a 6-inch (15 cm) handle and a 10-inch (25 cm) blade.
Bristol
Slightly lighter than the Devon with a bulge in the middle that accentuates the curve further up the hook. It has the same measurements as the Devonshire.
West Country
Lighter again than the Bristol with its much more traditional shape and identical measurements to the Devonshire.
Spar-hook
Very light with a 6-inch (15 cm) handle and a 6-to-7-inch (15 to 18 cm) blade. Too light to be used for snedding of anything except the smallest of side-shoots, its main use is the splitting of spars (or spits or broaches, depending upon the region), made from hazel gads for use by thatchers in pegging down the layers of thatch.
Kent
Also known as brishing hook.

=== Other hooks ===
Block hooks: With a straight or slightly convex cutting edge, they were often used in urban environments for cutting against a wooden block, similar to the back edge of a broom hook, used for trimming the head of a birch besom to length. Often found with a small hook at the back of the blade – useful for pulling the wood towards the user. Dutch hooks commonly have a straight blade and are shown in Renaissance paintings of carpenter's shops, where they would most probably have been used for rough shaping of timber, similar to the side axe.

A variety of other hooks were also made by most edge-tool makers, including pea and bean hooks, gorse or furze hooks, trimming hooks, staff hooks, slashers, pruning hooks, that are closely related to the billhook, although they may differ in shape, width or thickness of blade, length of handle, etc. For example, a slasher has a long handle. Another very close relation is the meat cleaver – sizes and handle-fixing of these are often very similar to billhooks. In some other European countries the same name is used for both tools, and it can be difficult to identify whether the tool is intended for cutting wood or animal bones.

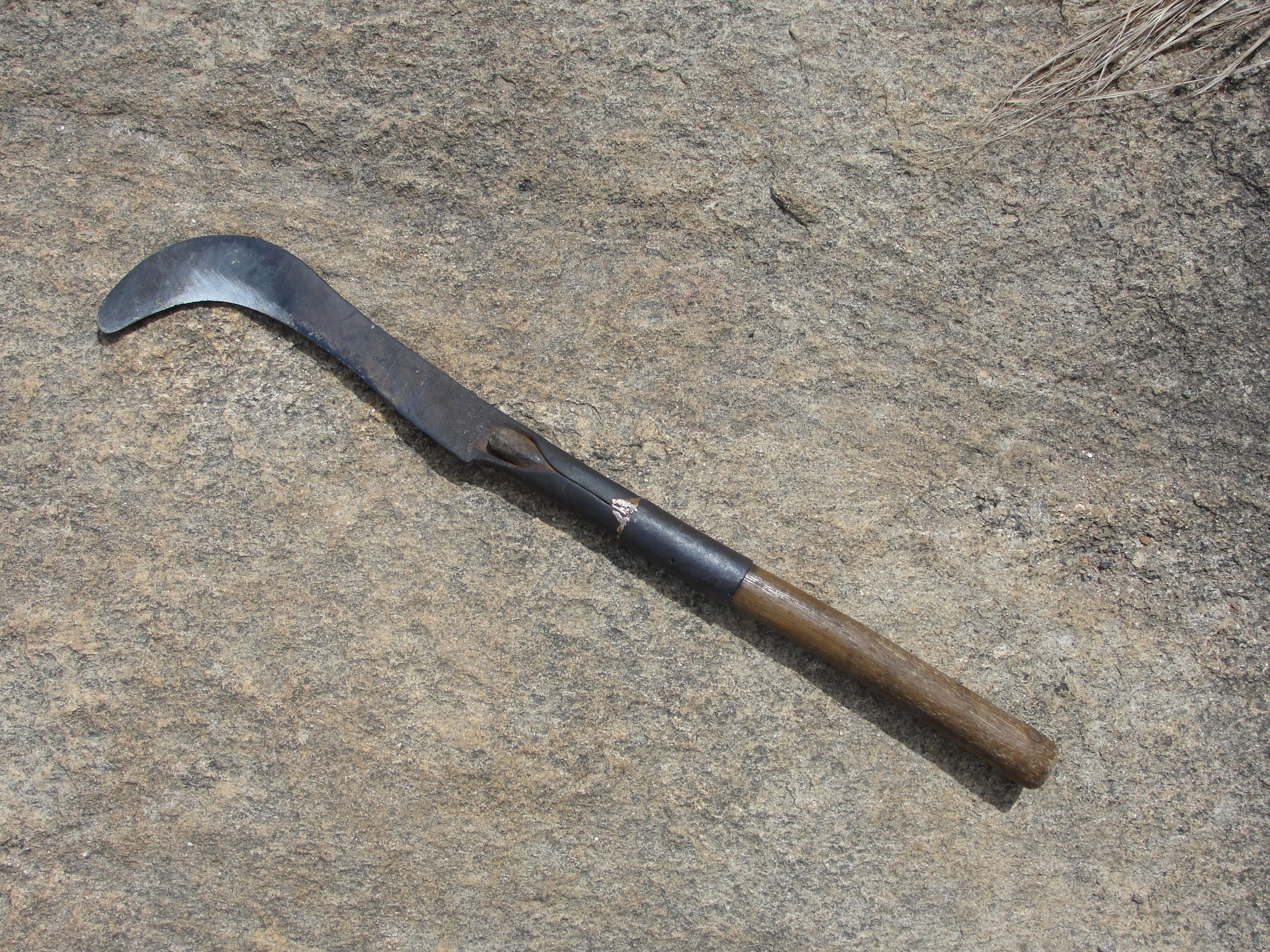
A slasher or long-handled billhook

Usage of billhooks also varies from country to country – in Sweden they were often used for cutting fodder for livestock, whereas in the UK a gorse or furze hook would have been used. In France and Italy they were widely used for pruning vines (only recently has wine making come back to the UK), and miniature billhooks were used for harvesting grapes during the vendange in France. In the Netherlands they were often used in a carpenter's workshop (in the UK use of a small hand axe was more common), and they were also found in the coopers' workshops in France, where they were known as a cochoir, and used in the making of wooden barrel hoops. In the Balkans they were used for harvesting maize. In Finland they are used to cut branches from trees and cutting down small trees, known as vesuri. Images of billhooks often appear on coats of arms of towns and villages, particularly in winemaking areas of Alsace, the Black Forest, Hungary and Switzerland, and have been found carved into boundary stones in parts of Germany and onto rock faces in Italy.

== Modern usage ==
Billhooks are currently in common use by thatchers, coppicers, agricultural hurdle makers, charcoal burners and often by other traditional craftsmen, bushcraft, farmers and woodsmen. They are also the primary tool for hedgelayers.

In the French Republican calendar, February 8 was named Serpette "Billhook".

== Military use ==
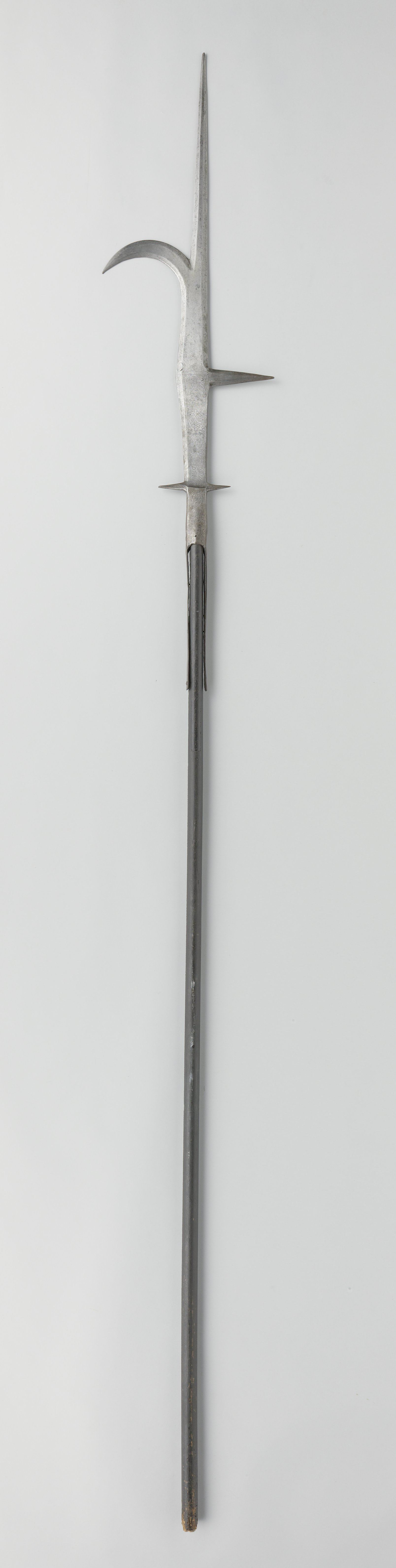
Medieval billhook

In the medieval period a weapon similar to the halberd was called a bill or billhook. It consisted of a pole with a bill-like blade mounted below a spearhead, with spikes added to the back of the blade to increase the versatility of the weapon against cavalry and armour. The English, in particular, were known for using massed billmen rather than pikes or halberds in the Renaissance period, notably at the Battle of Flodden in 1513, when the Scottish king James IV was felled by an arrow and bill.

The billhook is an issued tool in some armed forces (see fascine knife). It is used for cutting brushwood for making fascines (brushwood bundles) and gabions – originally for the construction of cannon emplacements, and later for machine gun emplacements. It is also issued to the pioneer corps of most regiments. In the Indian Army, it is given the name "knife gabion".

A non-military use as a weapon was a "pruning bill", described as the weapon used in the Pierre Rivière parricide case of 1835.

Finnish military engineer NCOs have a billhook as the part of their personal gear instead of an entrenching tool. It also doubles as a sidearm. Officers have a field axe.

== See also ==
- Aruval
- Bagging hook, similar to the sickle
- Bill (weapon)
- Brush hook
- Fascine knife, which was sometimes shaped like a billhook
- Falx
- Harpe, a Greek or Roman long sickle or scythe
- Kama, a Japanese and Okinawan tool used like a bill hook, though shaped more like a small scythe, also used as a weapon in some martial arts
- Kudi, an Indonesian billhook-axe hybrid, used as tool as well as weapon
- Linoleum knife
- Machete
- Scythe
- Sickle, the archetypal forerunner of the scythe
- Sling blade or Kaiser blade
