= Sling blade =

Tool for cutting brush and the like

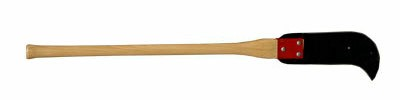
Kaiser blade

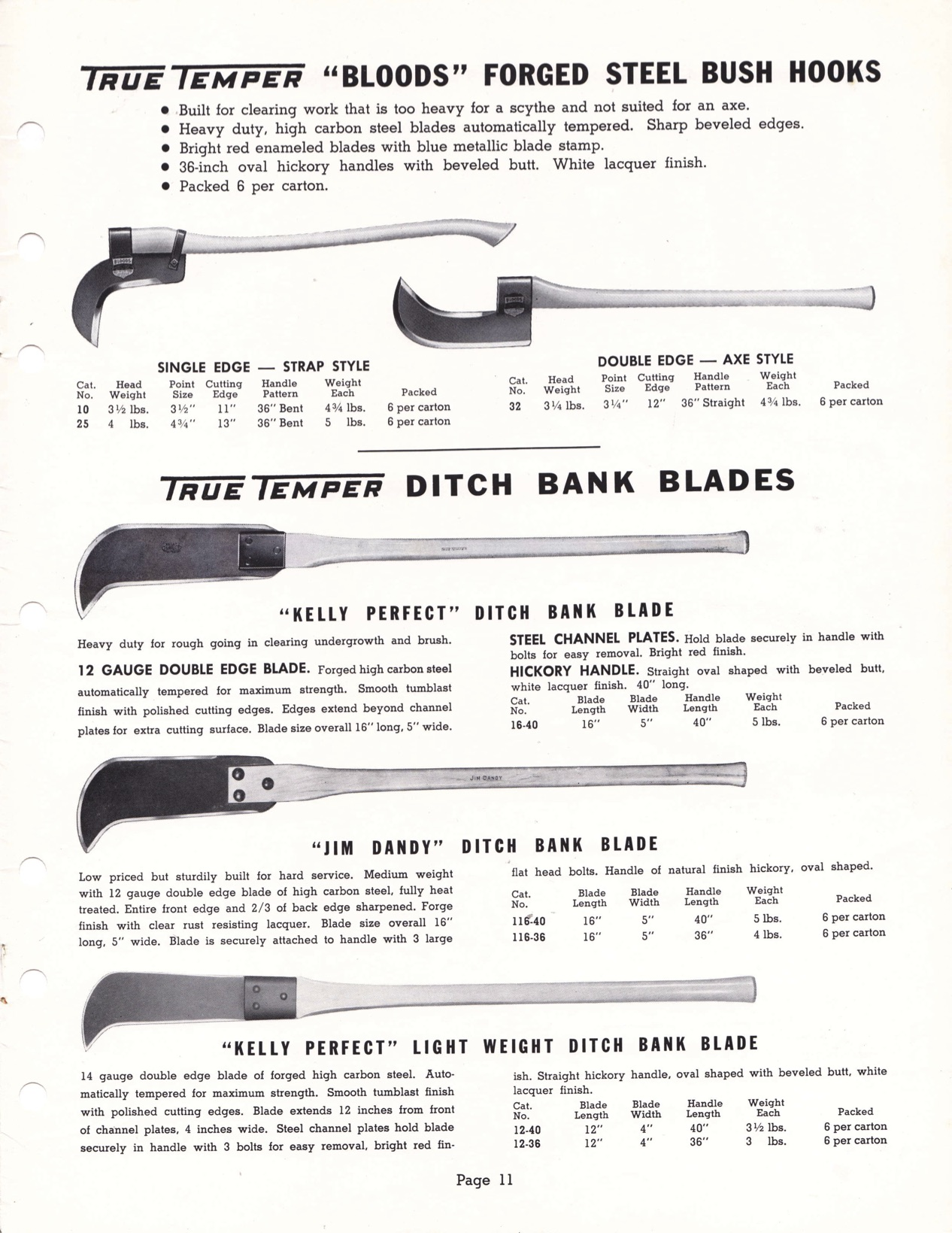
Page from the 1954 True Temper catalogue, showing a variety of types of sling blades

A sling blade or kaiser blade is a hand tool comprising a heavy, hooked steel blade at the end of a long (around 100-centimetre (40 in)) handle that is usually made of wood. The blade is double-edged, and both sides are usually kept sharp. The tool is used to cut brush, briar, and undergrowth. Its use is somewhat similar to that of an axe, and it is sometimes viewed as a type of axe. Other common names for the tool are bush knife, ditch bank blade, briar axe, and surveyor's brush axe. On the East Coast of the United States some farmers call it a bush axe. The Plover, Wisconsin, dialect refers to it as a ditch witch. It was also historically used as a wildland firefighting tool to cut fireline, known as a brush hook. It is also sometimes referred to as a bush hook in south eastern North Carolina. Its use in wildland firefighting has been substantially superseded by the chainsaw.

It generally has a 12-inch (30 cm) to 16-inch (41 cm) curved blade and a 36-inch (91 cm) to 48-inch (120 cm) handle. It is commonly used by surveying crews and firefighters to clear out heavy undergrowth from trails, as well as by homeowners and gardeners to clear thick brush.

== In popular culture ==
- In the film Sling Blade, Karl Childers (Billy Bob Thornton), the main character, recounts an incident from his childhood in which he killed his mother and her paramour with this tool. Childers describes it as, "Some folks call it a sling blade, I call it a kaiser blade. It's kinda got a long wooden handle, kind of like an axe handle. With a long blade on it shaped kinda like a bananer. Mhm. Sharp on one edge, and dull on the other. Mhm. It's what the highway boys use to cut down weeds and whatnot."
- In the novel Red Rising, Helldivers are equipped with sickle-like weapons called slingBlades, crude cutting weapons intended to sever the Helldiver's limbs if they are caught in machinery. The protagonist, Darrow, later acquires a slingBlade during the course of a war game. After breaking the rules of the game and attacking the Proctors, he gains popularity as "The Reaper", with the slingBlade acting as his sigil. While the term slingBlade is utilized throughout the novel and series, promotional materials show a blade more similar to a traditional sickle blade with a handle for single hand use or a blade shaped like an egyptian khopesh rather than a sling blade.

== See also ==
- Billhook
- Bill (weapon)
- Slasher (tool)
