= Kujang Monument =

Coordinates: 6°36′05″S 106°48′18″E

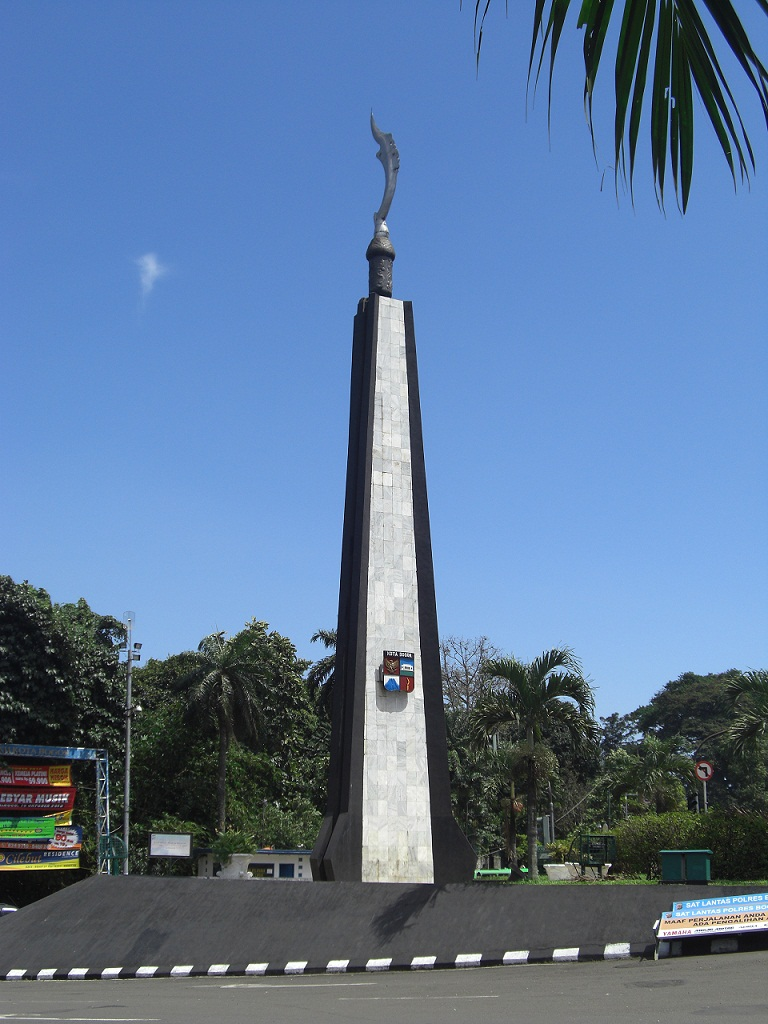
Kujang Monument

The Kujang Monument (Indonesian: Tugu Kujang) is a 25 metres (82 ft) obelisk located in Bogor, West Java, Indonesia. It features a Kujang on top and the Bogor city coat of arms on the centre. The Kujang is a traditional weapon of the Sundanese people. The obelisk is located at the intersection of two roads: Pajajaran and Otto Iskandardinata road, near the Bogor Botanical Garden. It was built in 4 May 1982 during the rule of mayor Achmad Sobana.

== See also ==
- Architecture of Bogor
