= Kujang (weapon) =

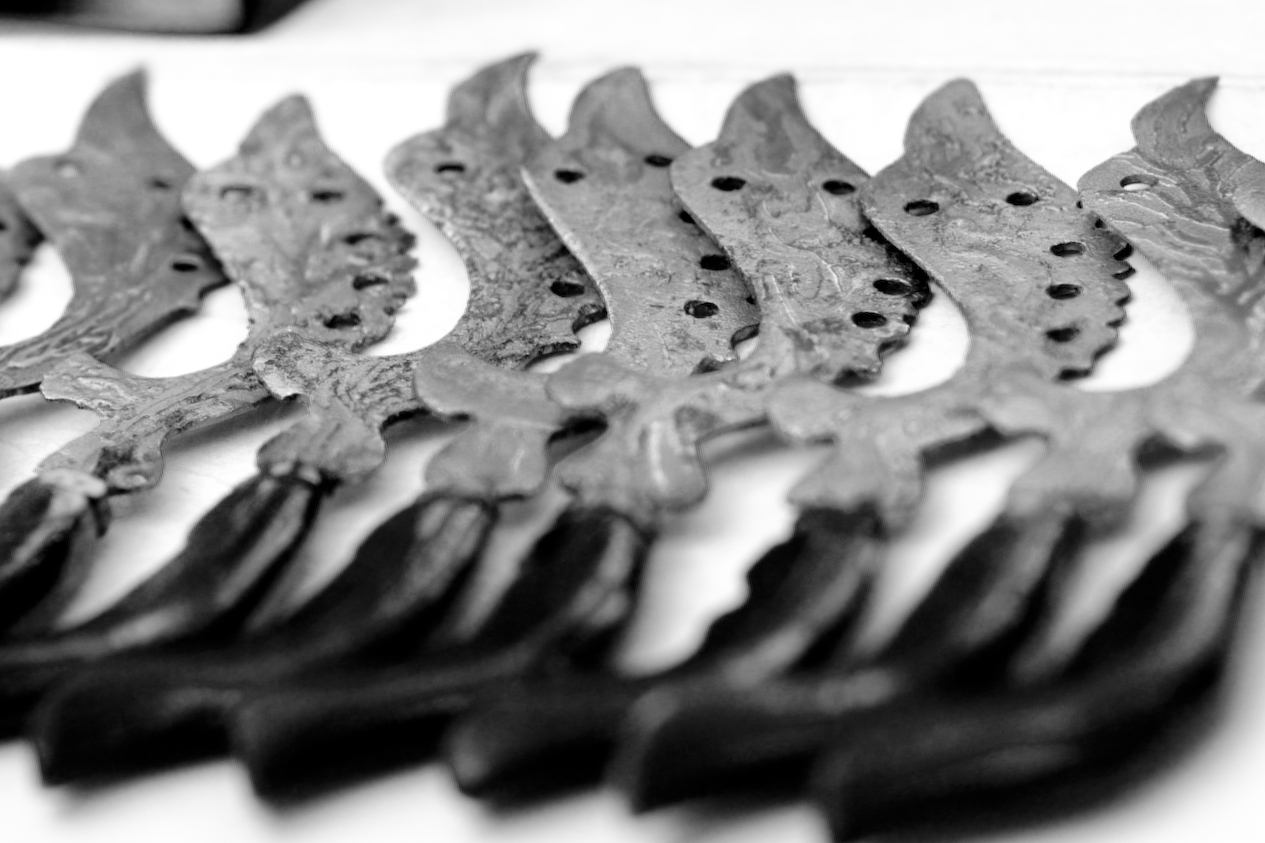
- Kujang, a typical weapon of Sundanese.
- Type: Dagger, Ceremonial Knife
- Place of origin: Indonesia

Service history
- Used by: Sundanese people

Specifications
- Mass: 300 g (11 oz) approximately
- Length: 20–25 cm (7.9–9.8 in)
- Blade type: Single edge, convex grind
- Hilt type: Water buffalo horn, wooden
- Scabbard/sheath: Water buffalo horn, wooden

The kujang is a bladed weapon native to the Sundanese people of Indonesia. The earliest kujang made is from around the 8th or 9th century. It is forged out of iron, steel, and pattern welding steel with a length of approximately 20–25 cm and weighs about 300 grams. According to Sanghyang siksakanda ng karesian canto XVII, the kujang was the weapon of farmers and has its roots in agricultural use. It is thought to have originated from its predecessor, a kudi. The kujang is one of the traditional weapons in the Sundanese school of pencak silat. The kujang, like the keris, is a blade of sentimental and spiritual value to the people of Indonesia.

== Description ==
Characteristics of a kujang include a cutting edge and other parts such as papatuk / congo the tip of the blade, eluk / silih the bulging curve at the base of the blade, tadah the inward curve at the belly of the blade, and mata small holes on the blade that are covered with gold or silver. Apart from its unique characteristics that tend to be thin, the material is dry, porous and contains many natural metal elements.

In Bogor poem as it is spoken by Anis Djatisunda (1996–2000), the kujang has many functions and shapes. Based on functions there are four of them namely, kujang pusaka (symbol of grandeur and safety protection), kujang pakarang (warfare), kujang pangarak (ceremonial), and kujang pamangkas (agricultural tool). As for the shapes, there is the kujang jago (shape of a rooster), kujang ciung (shape of a Javan cochoa bird), kujang kuntul (shape of an egret bird), kujang badak (shape of a rhinoceros), kujang naga (shape of a mythical dragon), and kujang bangkong (shape of a frog). Apart from that, there are shapes of the kujang blade that resemble female characters of wayang kulit as a symbol of fertility.

== See also ==
- Kujang Monument
- Keris
- Kudi
