= Forlorn hope =

Military trope

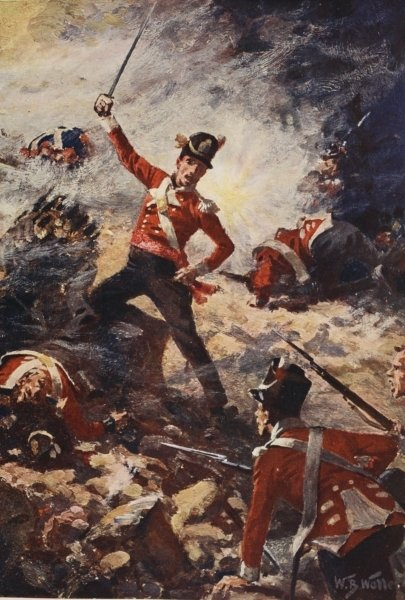
Colin Campbell leading the British forlorn hope at the siege of San Sebastián

A forlorn hope is a band of soldiers or other combatants chosen to take the vanguard in a military operation, such as a suicidal assault through the breach of a defended position, or the first men to climb a scaling ladder against a defended fortification, or a rearguard, to be expended to save a retreating army, where the risk of casualties is high. Such men were volunteers motivated by the promise of reward or promotion, or men under punishment offered pardon for their offenses, if they survived.

== Etymology ==
The term comes from the Dutch verloren hoop, literally "lost heap": the term hoop was used in military contexts to denote a troop formation. In the 16th century, when English-speakers first encountered the phrase, it was misheard as "forlorn hope", giving an added meaning to the term. While verloren is correctly identified with the English "forlorn" (both words stemming from the Proto-Germanic ferliusan), the Dutch word hoop (in its sense of "heap" in English) is not cognate with English "hope": this is an example of folk etymology. This folk etymology has been strengthened by the fact that in Dutch, the word hoop is a homograph meaning "hope" as well as "heap", although the two senses have different etymologies.

In German, the term was Verlorener Haufen, which has the same meaning as the Dutch term (i.e., lost heap), the word Haufen itself being a general term for a company of Landsknecht.

In French such a band was known as enfants perdus – "lost children".

== History ==
The notion of a band of volunteers undertaking a near-suicidal mission to lead an advance or guard a retreat is possibly as old as warfare itself; the story of Horatius at the bridge, in Roman times, is an early example.

In the New Model Army of the English Civil War, the "forlorn hopes" could lead a storming attack, be positioned in advance of the vanguard, or be left behind to protect the rearguard. Men were assigned to these roles by the drawing of lots, on the principle that divine providence would intervene in the selection and also decide the fate of those selected. The royalist forces also used the tactic.

In the German mercenary armies of the Landsknecht, these troops were called the verlorene Haufen, and carried long double-handed swords, with which they had to hew their way through the massive pike formations opposing them. Alternatively, a small force of verlorene Haufen could be used as "bait", to draw forward enemy formations and so expose them to the main force of Landsknecht behind. They also had to withstand the first wave of attacks when defending a breastwork. Members of the verlorene Haufen earned double pay, thus giving them the name of Doppelsöldner ('Double-wagers'). Since there were not enough volunteers for this assignment, criminals who had been sentenced to death were taken into the ranks as well. As a field sign, the verlorene Haufen carried a red Blutfahne ('Blood Banner').

By extension, the term forlorn hope became used for any body of troops placed in a hazardous position, e.g., an exposed outpost, or the defenders of an outwork in advance of the main defensive position. This usage was especially common in accounts of the English Civil War, as well as in the British Army in the Peninsular War of 1808–1814. In the days of muzzle-loading muskets, the term was most frequently used to refer to the first wave of soldiers attacking a breach in defenses during a siege.

While it was likely that most members of the forlorn hope would be killed or wounded, the intention was that some would survive long enough to seize a foothold that could be reinforced, or, at least, that a second wave with better prospects could be sent in while the defenders were reloading or engaged in mopping up the remnants of the first wave. That said, such soldiers were rarely suicidal or foolhardy: British troops of the forlorn hope at the 1812 Siege of Badajoz carried a large bag (5–6 feet (1.5–1.8 m) by 2 feet (0.61 m) in diameter) stuffed with hay or straw, which was thrown down into the enemy trenches to create a cushion and prevent injury as they jumped down.

A forlorn hope may have been composed of volunteers and conscripted criminals, and were frequently led by ambitious junior officers with hopes of personal advancement: if the volunteers survived, and performed courageously, they would be expected to benefit in the form of promotions, cash gifts, and added glory to their name (a military tradition at least as old as the Roman Republic). The commanding officer was virtually guaranteed both a promotion and a long-term boost to his career prospects if he survived.

In consequence, despite the grave risks involved for all concerned, there was often serious competition for the opportunity to lead such an assault and to display conspicuous valor.

The French equivalent of the forlorn hope, called Les Enfants Perdus ('The Lost Children'), were all guaranteed promotion should they survive. Both enlisted men and officers joined the dangerous mission as an opportunity to raise themselves in the army.

== See also ==
- Banzai charge
- Battle of Sari Bair
- Berserker
- Second Battle of Fort Wagner
- Battle of Stony Point
- Jauhar
- Cannon fodder
- Battle of Halidzor
- Forlorn Hope of the Donner Party
- Frontal assault
- Inghimasi
- Kamikaze
- Last stand
- Penal military unit
- Shock troops
- Suicide attack
- Suicide mission
