= Rodeleros =

Spanish 16-century shield-and-swordsmen

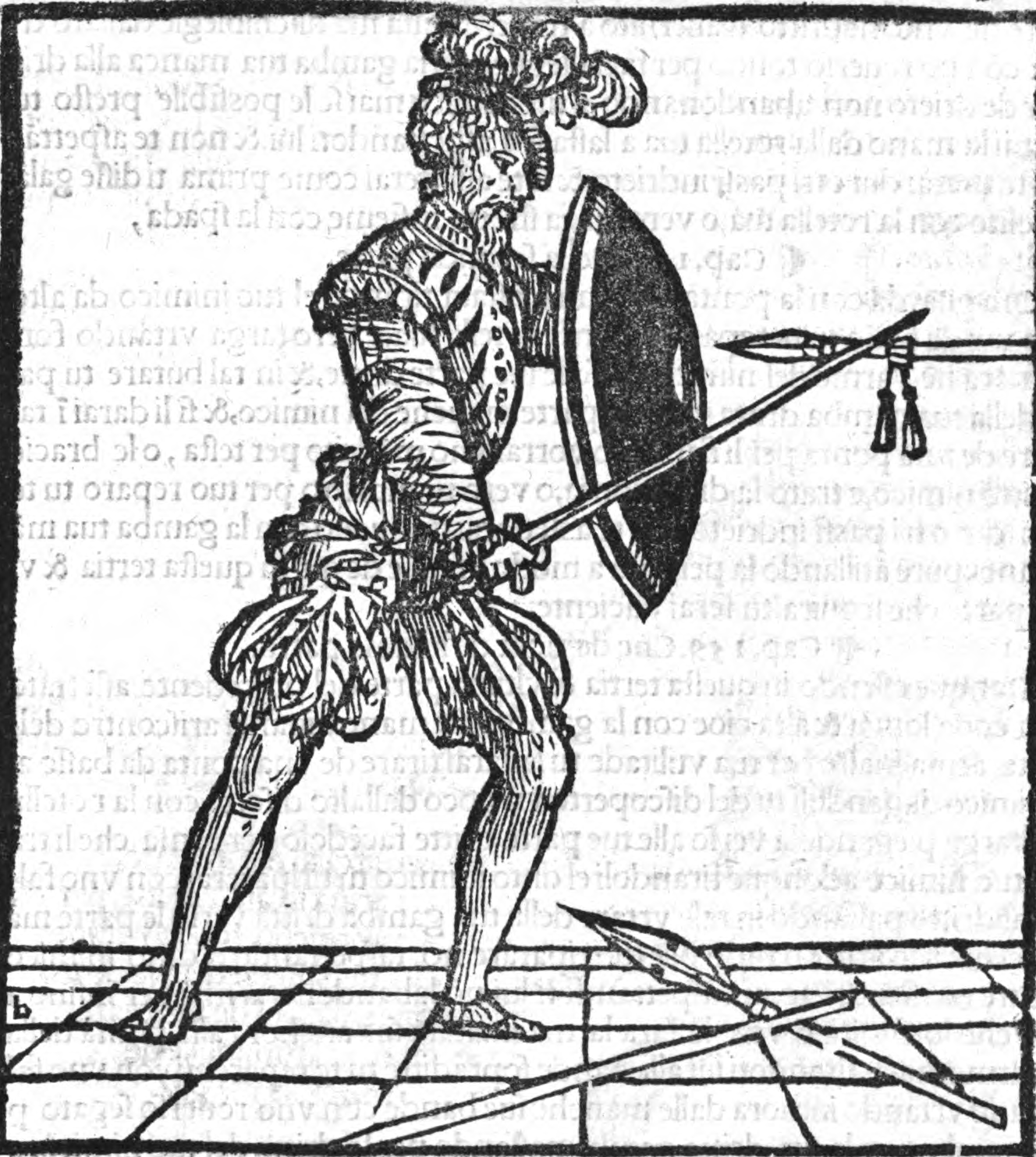
16th century woodcut of an Italian fencer wielding a Rodela/Rotella

Rodeleros ("shield bearers"), also called espadachines ("swordsmen") and colloquially known as "Sword and Buckler Men", were Spanish troops in the early 16th (and again briefly in the 17th) century, equipped with steel shields known as Rodela and swords (usually of the side-sword type). Originally conceived as an Italian attempt to revive the legionary swordsman, they were adopted by the Spanish and used with great efficiency in the Italian Wars during the 1510s and 1520s, but discontinued in the 1530s.

The majority of Hernán Cortés' troops during his campaigns in the New World were rodeleros: in 1520, over 1000 of his 1300 men were so equipped, and in 1521 he had 700 rodeleros, but only 118 arquebusiers and crossbowmen. Bernal Díaz, the author of an account of Cortés' conquest of the Aztecs, served as a rodelero under Cortés.

When the Spanish adopted the colunella (the first of the mixed pike and shot formations), they used small groups of sword and buckler men to break the deadlock of the push of pike, as the Swiss and Germans used halberdiers, comparable to the role of the German Doppelsöldner during the same period. At the Battle of Ravenna in 1512, they proved to be very effective with this tactic; however, when facing a fresh, well-ordered pike square, they were vulnerable as at the Battle of Seminara. They were also very vulnerable to attack by cavalry, while halberdiers were not. Halberdiers also had greater reach with their weapons than did swordsmen.

As battlefield tactics evolved during the early 16th century, the Spanish ultimately concluded that the vulnerability of the rodeleros on the battlefield outweighed their strengths, and they were dropped as a troop type when the Spanish infantry were reorganized into tercios in the 1530s. Their role was replaced by halberdiers. While Spanish infantry formations were 50% pikes, 33% swords, and 17% firearms in 1502, their ratios had shifted to 10% halberds, 30% pikes, and 60% firearms by the end of the 16th century.

Occasional attempts were made to revive them, such as by Maurice of Nassau, who armed his guard troops with a sword and buckler in addition to a pike. Later during the Thirty Years War, some military theorists proposed deploying swordsmen equipped with large iron shields in front of the pikemen to protect them from being shot by enemy musketeers, but it is doubtful whether this fanciful tactic was either successful or much employed in practice.

== See also ==
- Landsknechts
- Pikemen
- Swashbuckler
- Swiss mercenaries
- Tercio
- Knights
