= Push of pike =

Late medieval form of combat

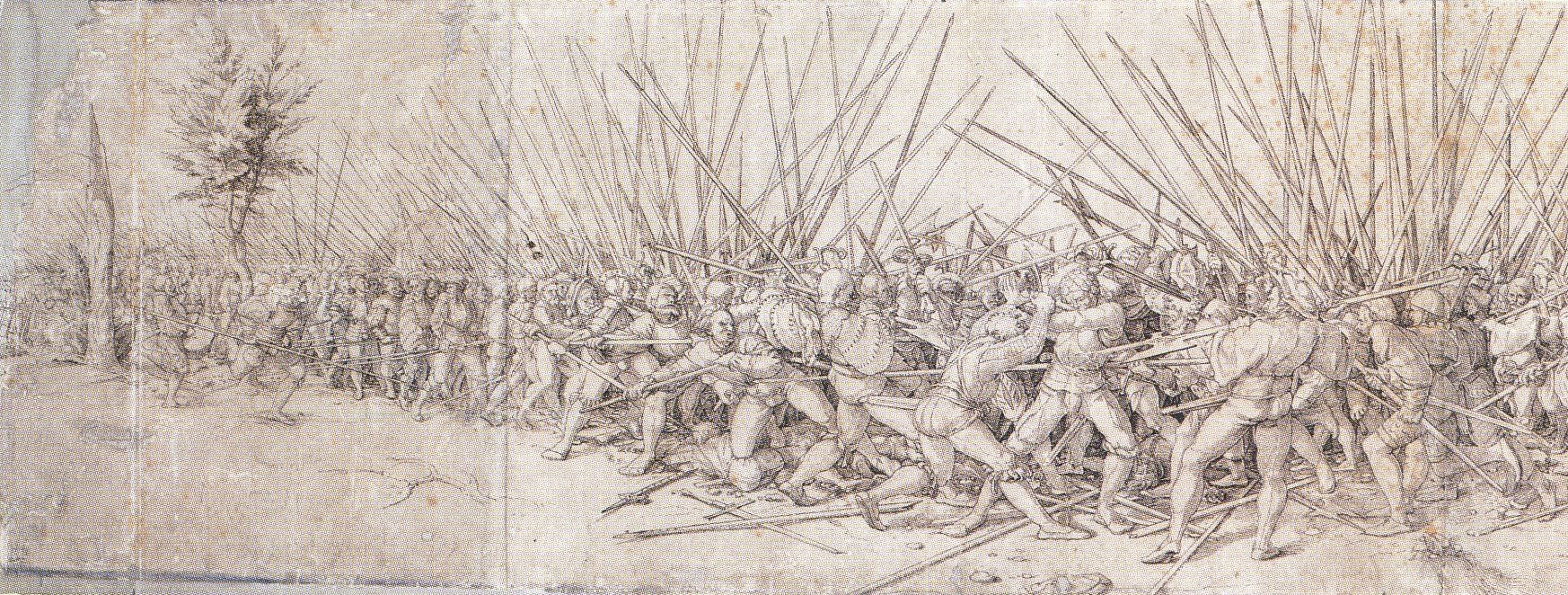
Swiss mercenaries and Landsknechte engaged in a push of pike (engraving by Hans Holbein the Younger, early 16th century)

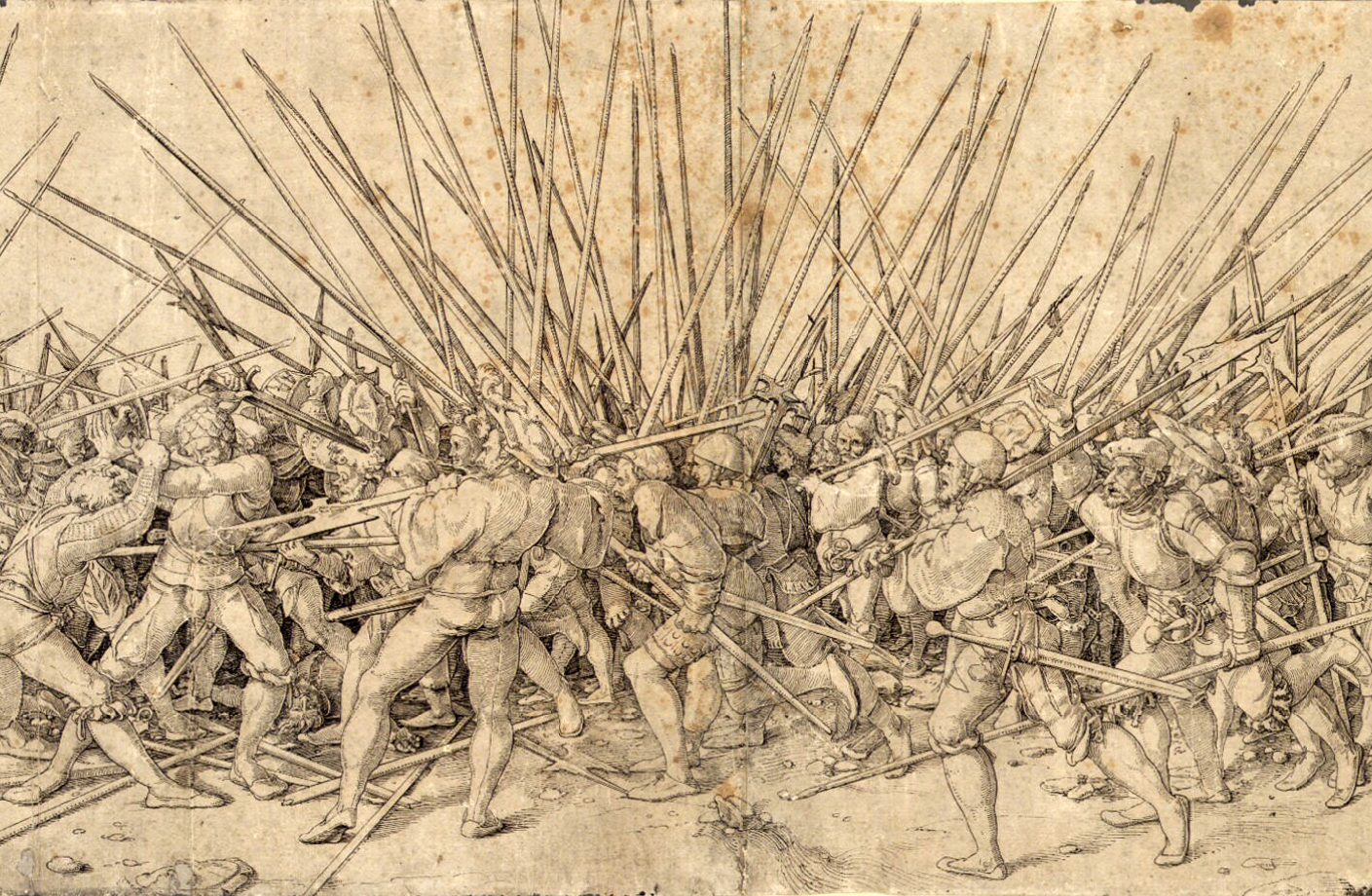
Right hand section of preceding drawing

The push of pike was a particular feature of Late Middle Ages and early modern warfare that occurred when two opposing columns of pikemen (often Swiss Reisläufer or German Landsknechte) met and became locked in position along a front of interleaved pikes.

== Shoving match ==
During push of pike, opposing blocks of pikemen would advance with their pikes "charged" horizontally at shoulder level to jab at one another until bodily contact was made. The two sides would then push physically until one or other of them gave way. The push of pike would continue until one of the opposing formations routed or fled, which generally led to massive casualties. Each man pressed on the one in front, and so sometimes the formations would crush against each other and many pikemen would have to fight in closer melee combat. The rear ranks would sometimes join the fray but their primary role was to add more weight to the push. Aside from getting impaled by enemy pikes, those in the front ranks died from getting crushed or suffocated due to the sheer number of bodies pressing from each side.

There are instances when both sides agreed to a break for a short rest then the pikemen resumes their clash. Rodeleros along with the Doppelsöldner were used in order to break push of pike engagements. The push of pike still played a role in the English civil war; two-thirds of the infantry consisted of pikemen at the start of the war, declining to one-third as the war progressed and the matchlock gained dominance. Pikemen often cut down the lengths of their pikes in order to make them more manageable. This habit had on many occasions disastrous consequences as the side with the longest pikes had the advantage during push of pike.

The push of pike was still crucial and it decided the outcome of many battles from the 14th to the early 18th century.

== Battles involving push of pike ==
- Battle of Arbedo (1422)

Italian Wars:

- Battle of Ravenna (1512)
- Battle of Novara (1513)
- Battle of Pavia (1525)
- Battle of Ceresole (1544)

Marian civil war:

- Battle of Langside (1568)

Anglo-Spanish War (1585–1604):

- Battle of Santo Domingo (1586)

Eighty Years' War:

- Battle of Zutphen (1586)
- Battle of Nieuwpoort (1600)

Wars of the Three Kingdoms:

- Battle of Stratton (1643)
- Battle of Inverlochy (1645)
- Battle of Torrington (1646)
- Battle of Dunbar (1650)

Irish Confederate Wars:

- Battle of Benburb (1646)
