= Montante =

Iberian longsword

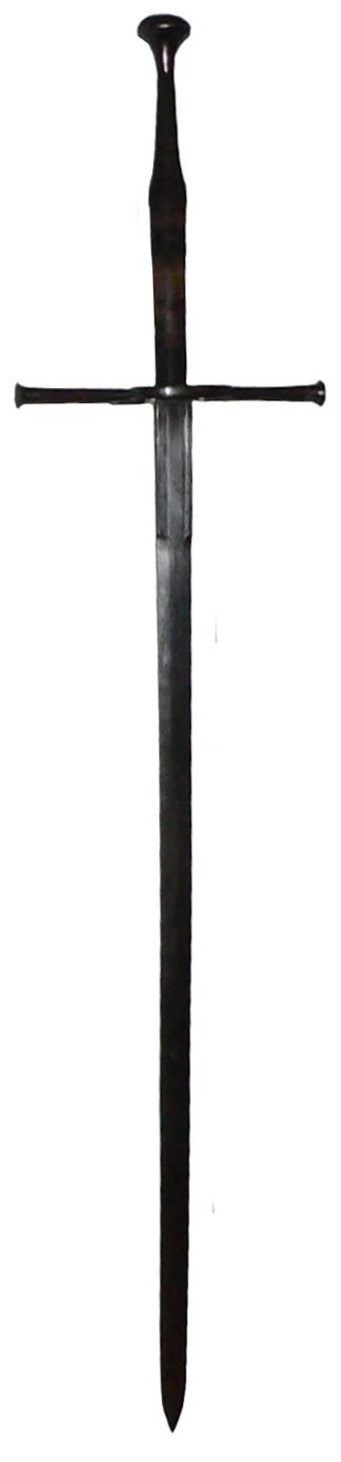
Montante from 15th or 16th centuries.

The montante is a two-handed sword used primarily in Spain and Portugal during the 15th to 17th centuries.

It developed from the longswords of the Late Middle Ages and the Renaissance. Its characteristics are a middle step between a standard European longsword and a German zweihänder, which it developed simultaneously with.

== History ==
Montantes were widely used in Spanish arms schools. It was also a ceremonial function, being used by the master of arms to signal the end of a duel or a spar between two alumns, leading to the idiom meter el montante ("get the montante in"). Masters of arms would wear a montante-shaped red patch in the right side of their jackets.

The montante met profuse usage on the battlefields, but was eventually phased out along with rodeleros and other types of soldiers armed with swords throughout the 16th century, when the tercios took main stage. However, even after the espada ropera became the Spanish sword par excellence, the montante was retained as a weapon, used by masters of arms, by bodyguards and occasionally in self-defense situations.

Contact between the Spanish Empire and the Holy Roman Empire, which peaked during the double reign of Charles I and V, caused the montante to be compared to the Swiss-German zweihänder. The weapons' name became confusingly interchangeable up to the 18th century, when writer Gregorio Mayans considered them different names for essentially the same weapon (the same was applied for mandoble, a word born in 1569 to refer to any kind of two-handed sword).

== Bibliography ==
- Díaz de Viedma, Luis (1639), Metodo de enseñanza de maestros en la ciencia filosofica de la verdadera destreza matematica de las armas, Barcelona.
- Figueyredo, Diogo Gomes (1651), Memorial Da Prattica do Montante Que inclue dezaseis regras simples, e dezaseis compostas Dado em Alcantara Ao Serenissimo Principe Dom Theodozio q. Ds. G.de Pello Mestre de Campo Diogo Gomes de Figueyredo, seu Mestre Na ciencia das Armas Em 10 de Mayo de 1651, Biblioteca da Ajuda (Lisbon), MS Av. 49-III-20, n.o 2.
- Leguina y Vidal, Enrique (1904), Bibliografía y historia de la esgrima española, Fortanet.
- Leguina y Vidal, Enrique (2000), Bibliografia e Historia de la Esgrima Espanola, ed. Mansfield Centre, Martino Publishing.
- Myers, Eric (2009), Memorial Of the Practice of the Montante by Diogo Gomes de Figueyredo.
- Oakeshott, Ewart (1980), European weapons and armour: From the Renaissance to the industrial revolution.
