= Pike and shot =

Infantry formation

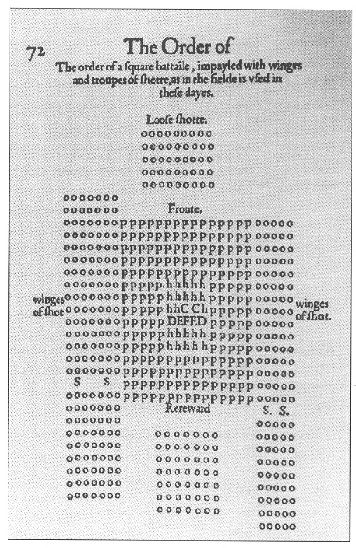
A 16th-century pamphlet showing a mixed pike and shot formation. Pikemen are represented by the letter "p", the two "winges of shot" by the letter "o". (The letter "h" represents halberdiers.) A group of "loose shotte" has been pushed forward into the front of the formation.

Pike and shot was a historical infantry tactical formation that first appeared during the late 15th and early 16th centuries, and was used until the development of the bayonet in the late 17th century. This type of formation combined soldiers armed with pikes and soldiers armed with arquebuses and/or muskets. Other weapons, such as swords, halberds, and crossbows, were also sometimes used. The formation was initially developed by the Holy Roman (Landsknechte) and Spanish (Tercios) infantries, and later by the Dutch and Swedish armies in the 17th century.

== Origin ==
By the 16th century, late-medieval troop types that had proven most successful in the Hundred Years' War, Burgundian Wars and the late phase of the Reconquista, dominated European warfare, especially the heavily armoured gendarme (a professional version of the medieval knight), the Swiss, the Spanish Tercio musketeers and the Landsknecht mercenary pikemen. The emerging artillery corps of heavy cannons was a rapidly improving technology.

Emperor Maximilian I opposed the French armies in the War of the Burgundian Succession and the Italian Wars and established the Landsknechte units. Many of their tactics were adapted from the Swiss mercenaries, but the use of firearms was added. The firearms, in conjunction with the pike formations, gave the Imperials a tactical edge over the French. Those pike and shot regiments were recruited in Germany, Austria, and Tyrol.

In 1495, at the Battle of Seminara, the hitherto-successful Spanish Army was trounced while opposing the French invasion of Naples by an army composed of armoured gendarme cavalry and Swiss mercenary infantry. The chastened Spanish undertook a thorough reorganization of their army and tactics under the great captain Gonzalo Fernández de Córdoba ("El Gran Capitán"). Realizing that he could not match the sheer offensive power of the French gendarmes and Swiss pikes, he took advantage of the shooting power of firearms, an emerging technology at the time, with the defensive strength of the pike, and to employ them in a mutually-supporting formation, preferably in a strong defensive position. At first, this mixed infantry formation was referred to as a colunella ("colonelcy") and was commanded by a colonel. It interspersed formations of men in close order armed with the pike and looser formations armed with the firearm, initially the arquebus. They reappeared during the conquest of Granada with "El Gran Capitán". The arquebusiers could shoot down their foes, and could then run to the nearby pikemen for shelter if enemy cavalry or pikes drew near. This was especially necessary because the firearms of the early 16th century were inaccurate, took a very long time to load and only had a short range, meaning the shooters were often only able to get off a few shots before the enemy was upon them.

This new tactic resulted in triumph for the Spanish and Fernández de Córdoba's colunellas at the Battle of Cerignola, one of the great victories of the Italian Wars, in which the heavily outnumbered Spanish pike-and-shot forces, in a strong defensive position, crushed the attacking gendarmes and Swiss mercenaries of the French army.

== History ==
=== Ratios ===
The proportion of melee weapons to shot varied depending on the state and era, as did the exact weapons used. In general, the later the date, the more prominent firearms were. Due to this, the role of the pike changed over time. In the late 15th century and the first half of the 16th, the pike was an offensive weapon; by the end of the 16th and into the 17th, its niche was primarily defensive, though this did not preclude fights between pikemen. The push of pike became rare and battles were increasingly resolved by shooting. Directly linked to this was halberds becoming less common, as their primary role in breaking the push became less relevant and their secondary role (repulsing cavalry) was better filled by more pikes: the French regulars abandoned the halberd in 1568 (aside from NCOs), and the Dutch not long after, while the Spanish army, as well as those of various Holy Roman Empire states, would continue to use the halberd in limited numbers into the mid-17th century (the English used the similar billhook). However, the predominance of shooting was not a universal advancement. For example, in the Wars of Religion of the 1560s and 1570s, 54% of wounds suffered by French soldiers were inflicted by swords, these being the most common weapons on the battlefield as pikemen, halberdiers, arquebusiers, musketeers, and cavalry all carried them as sidearms.

In 1471, the Burgundian State organized its army into 1,250 lances of nine men each, thus its forces were 2/8 heavy cavalry (men-at-arms and sergeants), 3/8 mounted archers (who also carried hand weapons and could fight dismounted), 1/8 pikemen, 1/8 crossbowmen, and 1/8 handgunners; the last man in each lance was a noncombatant page.

The Black Army of Hungary was one of the first forces to use the arquebus to a large degree. During its wars from 1477 to 1488, 25 percent of its soldiers had firearms (both arquebuses and more primitive handgonnes), an unusually high ratio for the time. The average in Europe by the end of the 15th century was that 10 percent of the infantry were equipped with firearms.

According to a Castilian ordinance for "people of war" of 1497, Spanish foot soldiers were divided into three categories. One-third of the infantry carried pikes; one-third had swords and shields; and the final one-third consisted of crossbowmen and gunmen. It is in this configuration that the Spanish army won the first Italian Wars. In preparation for the Third Italian War of 1502 to 1504, Spanish general Gonzalo Fernández de Córdoba set his companies at 50% pikes, 33% swords and shields, and 17% arquebuses. This ratio was flexible and could be changed as tactics required. The Battle of Cerignola, which demonstrated the power of the arquebus, had the Spanish army roughly following this ratio, with the infantry being 25% arquebusiers.

Following its 1506 military reforms, Florence had an army armed 70% with pikes, 10% with muskets, and the remaining 20% with halberds, hog-spears, or other close-combat weapons.

In 1515, the Black Band's companies consisted of 70% pikes, 12% arquebuses, 12% two-handed swords, and 6% halberds. For landsknechts in general, the usual arrangement was that one Fähnlein, the standard unit, had 400 men, of whom 300 were pikemen (75%), 50 were arquebusiers (12.5%), and 50 were halberdiers or two-handed swordsmen (12.5%). Arquebusiers, halberdiers, and swordsmen all received double pay compared to pikemen.

The Spanish army standardized the tercio arrangement in 1534. At this time, a tercio was 14 companies of two types. The first type, numbering twelve per tercio, had 219 pikemen and 20 musketeers. The second, comprising the remaining two companies, had 224 arquebusiers and 15 musketeers. Thus, at full strength, a tercio had 2,628 pikemen (79%), 448 arquebusiers (13%), and 270 musketeers (8%). However, in practice, muster rolls showed that tercios averaged 1,500-strong and had a ratio of 31% shot to 69% pikes. The musketeers used a particularly heavy firearm, which fired balls twice the size of an arquebus's.

In Venice, the proportions were first fixed in 1548, at 10% halberds, 30% arquebuses, and 60% pikes. French contracts of 1562 simply specified 33% of arquebusiers. For the English 1571-2 campaign in France, the recommended balance in newly formed companies was 6% halberds, 20% muskets, 34% arquebuses, and 40% pikes; this was adjusted in 1589 to 10% halberds, 30% pikes and 60% unspecified firearms. By 1600, France set a 1:1 ratio of pikes to firearms, and Spain 10% halberds, 30% pikes, 25% muskets, and 35% arquebuses. In 1560, following an order to increase the proportion of firearms, Spanish units in Italy became 54% pikes and 46% firearms. The Spanish average throughout the 16th century was 2 pikes for every firearm.

In the 1570s, the standard infantry company in Dutch service (whether they be Dutch or foreign hires, such as Germans and English) had about 150 men, including 4 officers (a captain, lieutenant, quartermaster, and barber-surgeon), 5 NCOs (two sergeants and three corporals), 15 musketeers, 65 arquebusiers, 45 pikemen, 12 halberdiers and targeteers, and 3 musicians (two fifers and a drummer). A study of a selection of Dutch companies from 1587, standardized by William of Orange, showed 34% pikes, 9% halberds, 5% swords and bucklers, and 52% firearms. Bucklers disappeared from the ranks by the end of the 16th century, as did halberds except in the hands of NCOs and bodyguards.

In 1588, the English Trained Bands consisted of 36% arquebusiers, 6% musketeers, 16% bowmen, 26% pikemen, and 16% billmen. Lansdowne MS 56, attributed to Lord Burghley, states that ideally infantry formations should consist of 50% shot, 30% pikes, and 20% billhooks.

In 1601, Spanish regiments in the Low Countries were 44% pikes and 56% muskets and arquebuses. German ones had far fewer firearms, with 79% pikes to 21% arquebuses and muskets. Proportions changed and, by 1625, the field infantry of the German Catholic League were 58% muskets and arquebuses, 36% pikes, and 6% halberds; this changed again in 1627 to 65% muskets, 20% pikes, and 15% halberds. The ideal field ratio often deviated from the usual combat experience; skirmishes, sieges, and minor actions were far more common than large pitched battles, and pikes were not as useful in these engagements due to the pike's low value as a personal weapon (indeed, in the English Civil Wars, only 15% of battle deaths occurred in major battles, whereas nearly half occurred in battles with fewer than 250 total casualties). In 1632, the Spanish army standardized their infantry companies at 68% arquebuses and muskets and 32% pikes.

Contemporary Japanese units, while heavily focused on firearms by East Asian standards, had higher ratios of other weapons to arquebuses compared to late 16th to early 17th century European formations. When Japan invaded Korea in 1592, 30% of Japanese soldiers had firearms, and the rest were equipped with pikes, swords, and bows. Firearms usage declined after 1603.

In 1618–1629, the pike to shot ratio fluctuated between 1 and 2 muskets per pike for various Western European armies. 1631–1632 saw an increased proportion of firearms, with some formations being more than 80% gunmen. The standard in the Imperial Army of the Holy Roman Empire in 1641 was 66% muskets and 33% pikes. As pike-on-pike clashes became less common in field battles, so did armor. By 1660, body armor had mostly disappeared in pike and shot formations; the pikes themselves had also shortened, from 18 feet to 13 feet. Brandenburg-Prussia was still issuing armor to its pikemen as late as 1674.

During the English Civil Wars (1642–1651), both sides preferred 2 guns to 1 pike, though this ratio was flexible.

A standard Dutch infantry company of 100 men in 1671, just prior to the Franco-Dutch War, was provided with 62 muskets, 34 pikes (and sets of armor), 2 halberds (for the company's sergeants) and 2 drums.

At the 1683 Battle of Vienna, the Imperial Army had set its infantry companies at 61% firearms, 33% pikes, and 6% shieldmen. The English army of the Nine Years War in the 1690s still had 2 muskets for every pike. Meanwhile, by 1687, the French army's ratio was set at 75–80% muskets and 20–25% pikes.

At the start of the Great Northern War in 1700, Russian line infantry companies were 83% muskets and 17% pikes. The musketeers were initially equipped with sword-like plug bayonets; they did not fully switch to socket bayonets until 1709. A Swedish infantry company at the start of the war consisted of 66% muskets and 33% pikes. While they all carried swords, Swedish musketeers were not completely equipped with bayonets until 1704.

The rapidly rising percentage of firearms spurred by pike-and-shot battles, until reaching near-100% by the 18th century, was generally not mirrored in non-European countries that did not adopt such tactics. Nor was the proliferation of the flintlock; matchlocks remained the most common firearms in India, China, and Southeast Asia until about the mid-19th century due to being far less complicated to manufacture. For example, by the mid-17th century, only 10–13% of Javanese soldiers used firearms, and by the 1680s, 20% of Thai soldiers used firearms. By 1825, 50% of Burmese soldiers had firearms, and as late as 1858, only 15% of the Vietnamese soldiers summoned to fight the Cochinchina campaign had firearms. By the 1840s, only 30–40% of Chinese soldiers had firearms (all matchlocks), the rest being armed with polearms, swords, and bows.

=== Spanish and Imperial developments ===
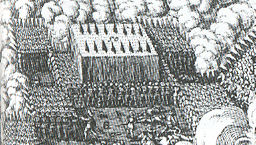
A tercio in "bastioned square"

Pike and shot formations were adopted by Afonso de Albuquerque in Portuguese India, influenced by Portuguse veterans who had fought in the Spanish side during the early Italian Wars.

The armies of Charles V, Holy Roman Emperor and King of Spain, further developed the pike and shot formation. The front line of Charles' German Landsknechte consisted of doppelsöldner, renowned for their use of arquebus and zweihänder during the Italian wars. The Spanish colunellas continued to show valuable flexibility as the Italian Wars progressed, and the Spanish string of battlefield successes continued. The colunellas were eventually replaced by the tercios in the 1530s by order of Charles. The tercios were originally made up of one-third pikemen, one-third arquebusiers and one-third swordsmen. Tercios were administrative organizations and were in charge of up to 3,000 soldiers. These were divided into ten companies that were deployed in battle. These companies were further subdivided into small units that could be deployed individually or brought together to form great battle formations that were sometimes called "Spanish squares".

As these squares matured in usage during the 16th century, they generally took on the appearance of a "bastioned square" – that is, a large square with smaller square "bastions" at each corner. The large square in the center was made up of the pikemen, 56 files across and 22 ranks deep. The outer edges of the central pike square were lined with a thin rank of arquebusiers totaling 250 men. At each corner of this great pike square were the smaller squares of arquebusiers, called mangas (sleeves), each 240 men strong. Finally, two groups in open order, each of 90 men and armed with the longer musket, were placed in front of, and to the sides of, the arquebusiers.

Normal attrition of combat units (including sickness and desertion) and the sheer lack of men usually led to the tercios being far smaller in practice than the numbers above suggest but the roughly 1:1 ratio of pikemen to shooters was generally maintained. The tercios for all armies were usually of 1,000 to 2,000 men, although even these numbers could be reduced by the conditions already mentioned. Tercio-type formations were also used by other powers, chiefly in the Germanic areas of the Holy Roman Empire.

To modern eyes, the tercio square seems cumbersome and wasteful of men, many of the soldiers being positioned so that they could not bring their weapons to bear against the enemy. However, in a time when firearms were short-ranged and slow to load, it had its benefits. It offered great protection against cavalry – still the dominant fast-attack arm on the battlefield – and was extremely sturdy and difficult to defeat. It was very hard to isolate or outflank and destroy a tercio by maneuver due to its great depth and distribution of firepower to all sides (as opposed to the maximization of combat power in the frontal arc as adopted by later formations). The individual units of pikemen and musketeers were not fixed and were re-ordered during battle to defend a wing or to bring greater fire power or pikes to bear in a certain direction. Finally, its depth meant that it could run over shallower formations in a close assault – that is, should the slow-moving tercio manage to strike the enemy line.

Armies using the tercio generally intended to field them in brigades of at least three tercios, with one in the front and two behind, the rearward formations echeloned off on either side so that all three resembled a stepped pyramid. The word tercio means "a third" (that is, one third of the whole brigade). This entire formation would be flanked by cavalry. The musketeers, and those arquebusiers whose shooting was not blocked by friendly forces, were supposed to keep up a continuous fire by rotation. This led to a fairly slow rate of advance, estimated by modern writers at roughly 60 meters a minute (60 m/hr.?). Movement of such seemingly unwieldy groups of soldiers was difficult but well-trained and experienced tercios were able to move and manoeuvre with surprising facility and to great advantage over less-experienced opponents. They would be co-ordinated with each other in a way that often caught attacking infantry or cavalry with fire coming from different directions from two or more of these strong infantry squares.

=== The French failure to keep pace ===
The great rivals of the Spanish/Habsburg Empire, the Kings of France, had access to a smaller and poorly organized force of pike and shot. The French military establishment showed considerably less interest in shot as a native troop type than did the Spanish until the end of the sixteenth century, and continued to prefer close combat arms, particularly heavy cavalry, as the decisive force in their armies until the French Wars of Religion; this despite the desire of King Francis I to establish his own pike and shot contingents after the Battle of Pavia, in which he was defeated and captured. Francis had declared the establishment of the French "Legions" in the 1530s, large infantry formations of 6,000 men which were roughly composed of 60% pikemen, 30% arquebusiers and 10% Halberdiers. These legions were raised regionally, one in each of Normandy, Languedoc, Champagne and Picardy. Detachments of around 1,000 men could be sent off to separate duty, but in practice the Legions were initially little more than an ill-disciplined rabble and a failure as a battlefield force, and as such were soon relegated to garrison duty until they matured in the seventeenth century.

In practice, pike and shot formations that the French used on the sixteenth-century battlefield were often of an ad hoc nature, the large blocks of Swiss mercenary, Landsknecht, or, to a lesser extent, French pikemen being supported at times by bands of mercenary adventurer shot, largely Gascons and Italians. (The Swiss and Landsknechts also had their own small contingents of arquebusiers, usually comprising not more than 10–20% of their total force. The French were also late to adopt the musket, the first reference to their use being at the end of the 1560s—twenty years after its use by the Spanish, Germans and Italians.

This was essentially the condition of the French Royal infantry throughout the French Wars of Religion that occupied most of the latter sixteenth century, and when their Huguenot foes had to improvise a native infantry force, it was largely made up of arquebusiers with few if any pikes (other than the large blocks of Landsknechts they sometimes hired), rendering formal pike and shot tactics impossible.

The French and their Imperial rivals after the Spanish and Imperial adoption of the tercio, the Battle of Ceresole, the Imperial pike and shot formations shot down attacking French gendarmes, defending themselves with the pike when surviving heavy cavalry got close. Although the battle was ultimately lost by the Spanish and Imperial forces, it demonstrated the self-sufficiency of the mixed pike and shot formations, something sorely lacking in the French armies of the day.

=== Dutch reforms ===
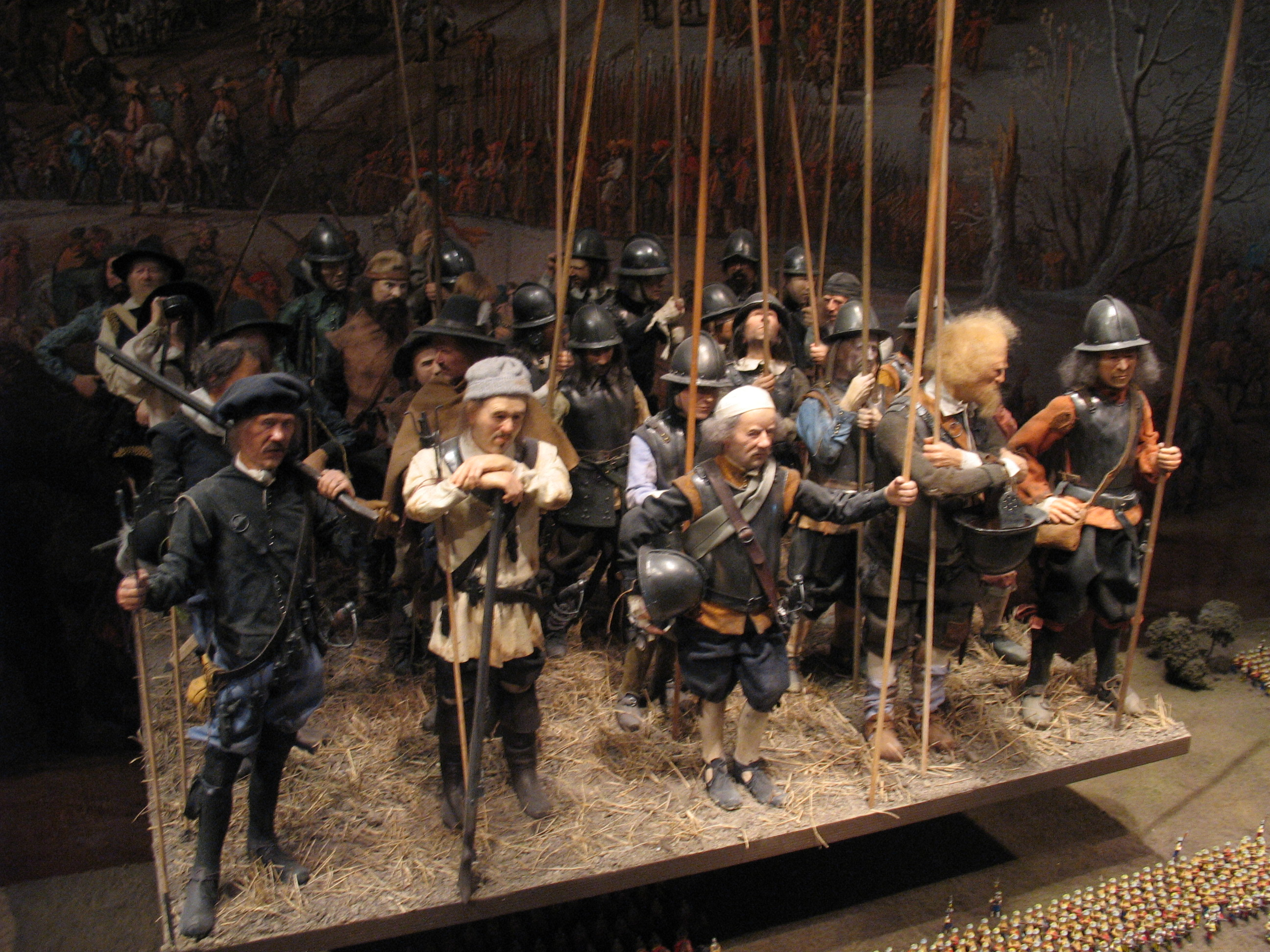
A model of a section of a pike and shot formation from the Thirty Years' War on display at the Army Museum in Stockholm. Consistent (uniform) dress was not common for military troops at the time.

Foremost amongst the enemies of the Spanish Habsburg empire in the late 16th century were the Seven Provinces of the Netherlands (often retroactively known as the "Dutch"), who fought a long war of independence from Spanish control starting in 1568. After soldiering on for years with a polyglot army of foreign-supplied troops and mercenaries, the Dutch took steps to reform their armies starting in 1590 under their captain-general, Maurice of Nassau, who had read ancient military treatises extensively.

In addition to standardizing drill, weapon caliber, pike length, and so on, Maurice turned to his readings in classical military doctrine to establish smaller, more flexible combat formations than the ponderous regiments and tercios which then presided over open battle. Each Dutch battalion was to be 550 men strong, similar to the size of the ancient Roman legionary 480-man cohort described by Vegetius. Although inspired by the Romans, Maurice's soldiers carried the weapons of their day—250 were pikemen and the remaining 300 were arquebusiers and musketeers, 60 of the shot serving as a skirmish screen in front of the battalion, the rest forming up in two equal bodies, one on either side of the pikemen. Two or more of these battalions were to form the regiment, which was thus theoretically 1,100 men or stronger, but unlike the tercio, the regiment had the battalions as fully functional sub-units, each of mixed pike and shot which could, and generally did, operate independently, or could support each other closely.

These battalions were fielded much less deep than the infantry squares of the Spanish, the pikemen being generally described as five to ten ranks deep, the shot eight to twelve ranks. In this way, fewer musketeers were left inactive in the rear of the formation, as was the case with tercios which deployed in a bastioned-square.

Maurice called for a deployment of his battalions in three offset lines, each line giving the one in front of it close support by means of a checkerboard formation, another similarity to Roman military systems, in this case the Legion's Quincunx deployment.

In the end, Maurice's armies depended primarily on defensive siege warfare to wear down the Spanish attempting to wrest control of the heavily fortified towns of the Seven Provinces, rather than risking the loss of all through open battle. On the rare occasion that open battle occurred, this reformed army, as many reformed armies have done in the past, behaved variably, running from the Spanish tercios one day, fighting those same tercios only a few days later, at the Battle of Nieuwpoort, and crushing them. Maurice's reforms are more famous for the effect they had on others—taken up and perfected, and would be put to the test on the battlefields of the seventeenth century.

=== Swedish innovations ===
After bad experiences with the classic tercios formations in Poland, Gustav II Adolf decided to reorganize his battlefield formations, initially adopting the "Dutch formations", but then adding a number of innovations of his own.

He started by re-arranging the formations to be thinner, typically only four to six ranks deep, spreading them out horizontally into rectangles instead of squares. This further maximized the number of musketeers near the front of the formation. Additionally, he introduced the practice of volley fire, where all of the gunners in the ranks would fire at the same time. This was intended to bring down as many members of the opposing force's front line as possible, causing ranks moving up behind them to trip and fall as they were forced forward by the ranks further back. Finally, he embedded four small "infantry guns" into each battalion, allowing them to move about independently and not suffer from a lack of cannon fire if they became detached.

Gustav also placed detached musketeers in small units among the cavalry. In traditional deployments, the infantry would be deployed in the middle with cavalry on both sides, protecting the flanks. Battles would often open with the cavalry attacking their counterparts in an effort to drive them off, thereby opening the infantry to a cavalry charge from the side. An attempt to do this against his new formations would be met with volley fire, perhaps not dangerous on its own, but giving the Swedish cavalry a real advantage before the two forces met. Under normal conditions, detached musketeers without pikemen would be easy targets for the enemy cavalry, but if they did close to sabre range, the Swedish cavalry would be a more immediate concern.

The effect of these changes was profound. Gustav had been largely ignored by most of Europe after his mixed results in Poland, and when he arrived in Germany in 1630 he was not immediately challenged. He managed to build up a force of 24,000 regulars and was joined by a force of 18,000 Saxons of questionable quality under von Arnim. Battle was first joined in major form when Johann Tserclaes, Count of Tilly turned his undefeated 31,000-man veteran army to do battle, meeting Gustav at the Battle of Breitenfeld in 1631. Battle opened in traditional fashion, with Tilly's cavalry moving forward to attack the flanks. This drove off the Saxons on the one flank, but on the other Gustav's new combined cavalry/musket force drove off any attempt to charge. With one flank now open, Tilly nevertheless had a major positional advantage, but Gustav's smaller and lighter units were able to easily re-align to face the formerly open flank, their light guns cutting into their ranks while the heavier guns on both sides continued to exchange fire elsewhere. Tilly was soon driven from the field, his forces in disarray.

Follow-up battles had similar outcomes, and Tilly was eventually mortally wounded during one of these. By the end of 1632, Gustav controlled much of Germany. However, his successes were short-lived, as the opposing Imperial forces quickly adopted similar tactics. From this point on, pike and shot formations gradually spread out into ever-wider rectangles to maximize firepower of the muskets. Formations became more flexible, with more firepower and independence of action.

=== Outside of Europe ===
Meanwhile in East Asia, the utility of pike and shot style formations were still being tested. The Japanese army in the Imjin War supported their gunmen (25–30% of their initial force) with spear and bow levies, but the pike was not as emphasized as it was in contemporary Europe due to the lack of a large cavalry threat in either Japan or Korea. At the 1619 Battle of Sarhū, the Koreans (drawing on lessons from 1592 to 1598) deployed an all-shot formation (10,000 arquebusiers and 3,000 archers) using volley fire against the cavalry-heavy Manchus. The arquebusiers inflicted many losses on the Manchus, but were routed. This prompted a revision of military tactics in Korea. After the defeat at Sarhū, the Joseon forces revised their doctrine to have spearmen supporting the arquebusiers to better withstand shock cavalry. The new Korean force was tested against the Manchus again in 1627 and 1636–1637. Both times, they were defeated, but their performance left a strong impression on the Manchus. The first emperor of the newly declared Qing dynasty later wrote: "The Koreans are incapable on horseback but do not transgress the principles of the military arts. They excel at infantry fighting."

== Decline ==
After the mid-seventeenth century, armies that standardized the adoption of the flintlock musket began to abandon the pike altogether (flintlocks and proto-flintlocks, such as the miquelet lock, had been in use since the early 16th century, but remained less common than matchlocks until the late 17th), or to greatly decrease their numbers. A bayonet could be affixed to the musket, turning it into a spear, and the musket's firepower was now so deadly that combat was often decided by shooting alone. Moreover, the flintlock could be loaded and fired approximately twice as fast as the matchlock, and misfired far less. The abandonment of the pike, together with the faster firing rate made possible by the standardization of the flintlock musket and paper cartridge, resulted in the abandonment of the deeper formations of troops more ideal for the melee-oriented pikemen. Military thinking switched to shallower lines that maximized the firepower of an infantry formation. By one calculation, a formation equipped entirely with mid-18th century flintlocks could output ten times as many shots in an equivalent period of time as a typical early 17th century pike and shot formation equipped with matchlocks (pike:shot ratio of 3:2), enormously changing the tactical calculus of the infantry's armament. From 1688 to 1696, 3 out of every 5 Austrian and British soldiers had a flintlock musket, the rest mostly had matchlocks.

After the Battle of Rocroi fought on 19 May 1643, the Spanish abandoned the Tercio system and adopted the line infantry doctrine used by the French. A common end date for the use of the pike in infantry formations is 1700, although some armies, such as the Prussians, had already abandoned the pike decades prior, whereas others, such as the Swedish and Russians, continued to use it for several decades afterward—the Swedes of King Charles XII in particular were using it to great effect until 1721. The Army of the Holy Roman Empire officially stopped using pikemen in 1699. It had been progressively phasing out both pikes and lances since the Thirty Years War. Following Montecuccoli's reforms in the 1660s, the paper strength of an Imperial infantry company was 48 pikemen, 88 musketeers, and 8 shieldmen. The Imperial Army used this configuration during the Great Turkish War, most famously at the Battle of Vienna, where flintlock muskets were outnumbered by matchlocks (the flintlock would not enter regular service until 1699). During the same conflict, the Polish-Lithuanian army also made extensive use of pikes. In 1703, the French Royal Army also discontinued the use of the pike, followed in 1704 by the English Army and in 1708 by the Dutch States Army. Between 1699 and 1721, all infantry regiments of the army of Peter the Great were converted into line infantry.
