= Tross =

16th century German camp followers

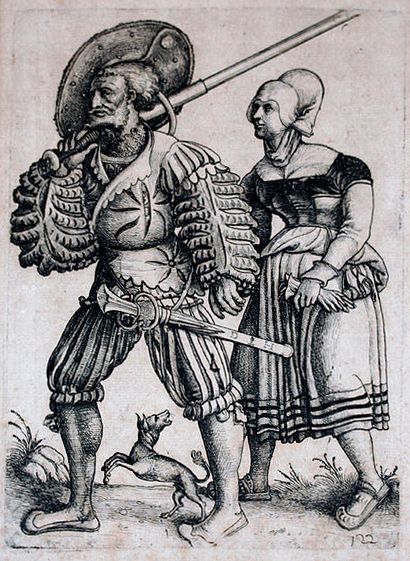
Landsknecht with his Wife. Etching by Daniel Hopfer.

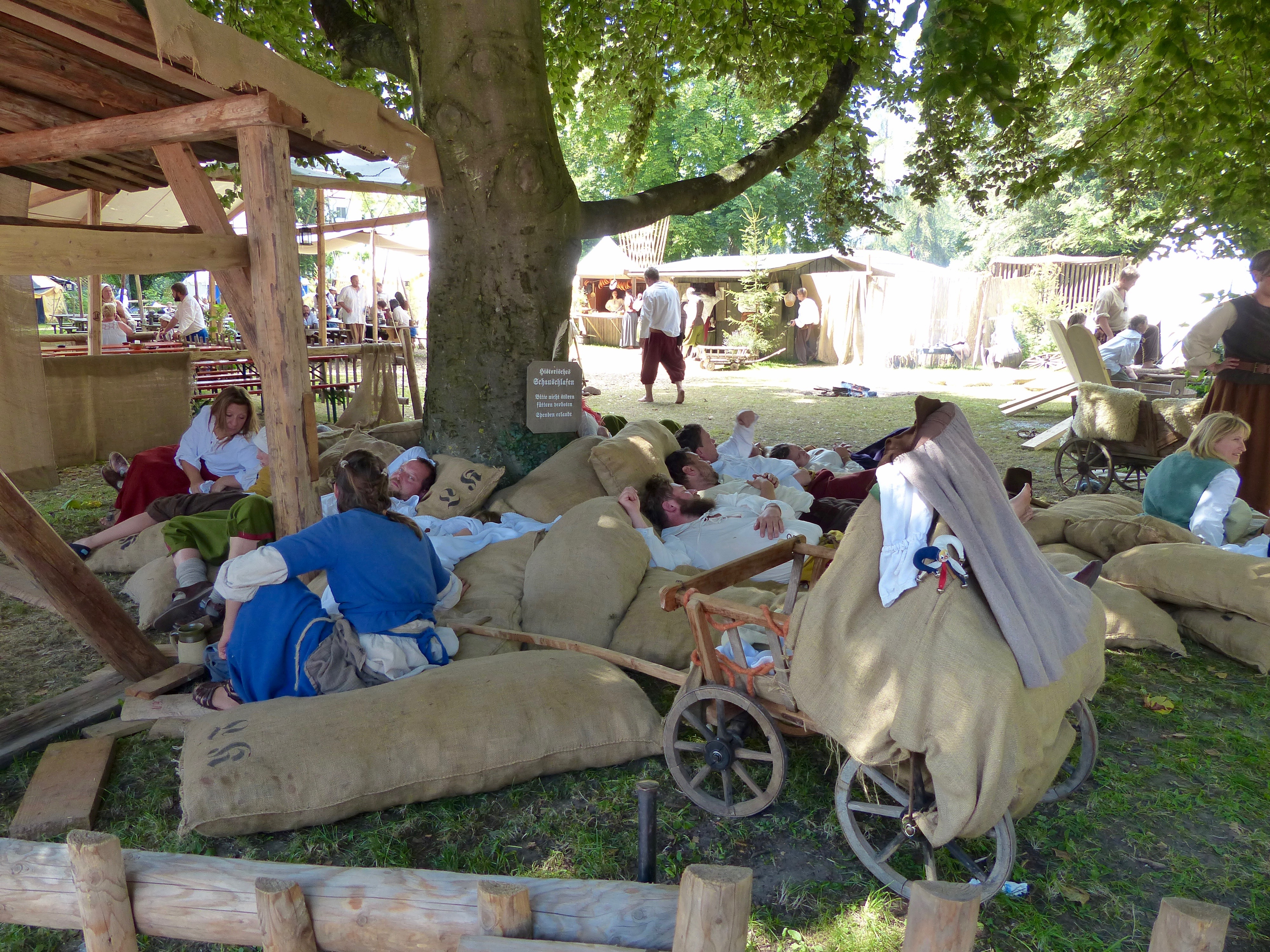
Tross at a medieval reenactment

The Tross was the camp follower contingent of the Landsknecht mercenary regiments which originated at the end of the fifteenth century, and were the dominant form of infantry mercenary force throughout the sixteenth century. Each Landsknecht unit traveled with a Tross contingent, which followed behind. They carried the military and fighting necessities, the food and the belongings of each "Soldat" ("soldier") and his family. Members of the Tross were made up of women, children, craftsmen and day laborers. The term "support staff" can be used to give the German word a clearer meaning, although its true English translation is "unit train" or "baggage train". Sometimes spelled Dross, the term derives from Middle High German trosse, from French trousse ("kit"); it is not related to English dross (Old English drōsna, drōsne, "dregs, sediment").

Many women of the Tross were wives of the soldiers, or other family members such as sisters, nieces, or daughters. Some of the women were betrothed to a member of the military unit. Very few single, unattached women were permitted into the ranks of the Tross in fear that their possible turn to prostitution would cause unrest in the baggage train by disrupting family relationships. Unattached women allowed into the Tross were those who possessed a skill or trade which made them a valuable asset, not only to the Tross unit, but to the military unit as well. However, they were closely watched until they took a legitimate husband.

The custom of a regiment being followed by the Tross continued beyond the period of the Landsknechte. During the Thirty Years' War, it could occur that a 1,000-man regiment would be accompanied by 500 women and 300 children. The Tross was indispensable for supply purposes, although it limited the freedom of movement of the army. At times, the Tross fell prey to opposing armies.

== Notes ==
Portions of this article were translated from the German Wikipedia.
