= Daniel Hopfer =

German artist (1470–1536)

Daniel Hopfer (c. 1470 – 1536) was a German artist who is widely believed to have been the first to use etching in printmaking, at the end of the 15th century. He also worked in woodcut. Although his etchings were widely ignored by art historians for years, more recent scholarship is crediting him and his work with "single-handedly establishing the salability of etchings" and introducing the print publisher business model.

Unlike most later prints, etched on copper plates, Hopfer's printed etching continued to use the iron plates he was used to working with in steel plate armour, the material he was trained in, and with which he continued to work.

== Life ==
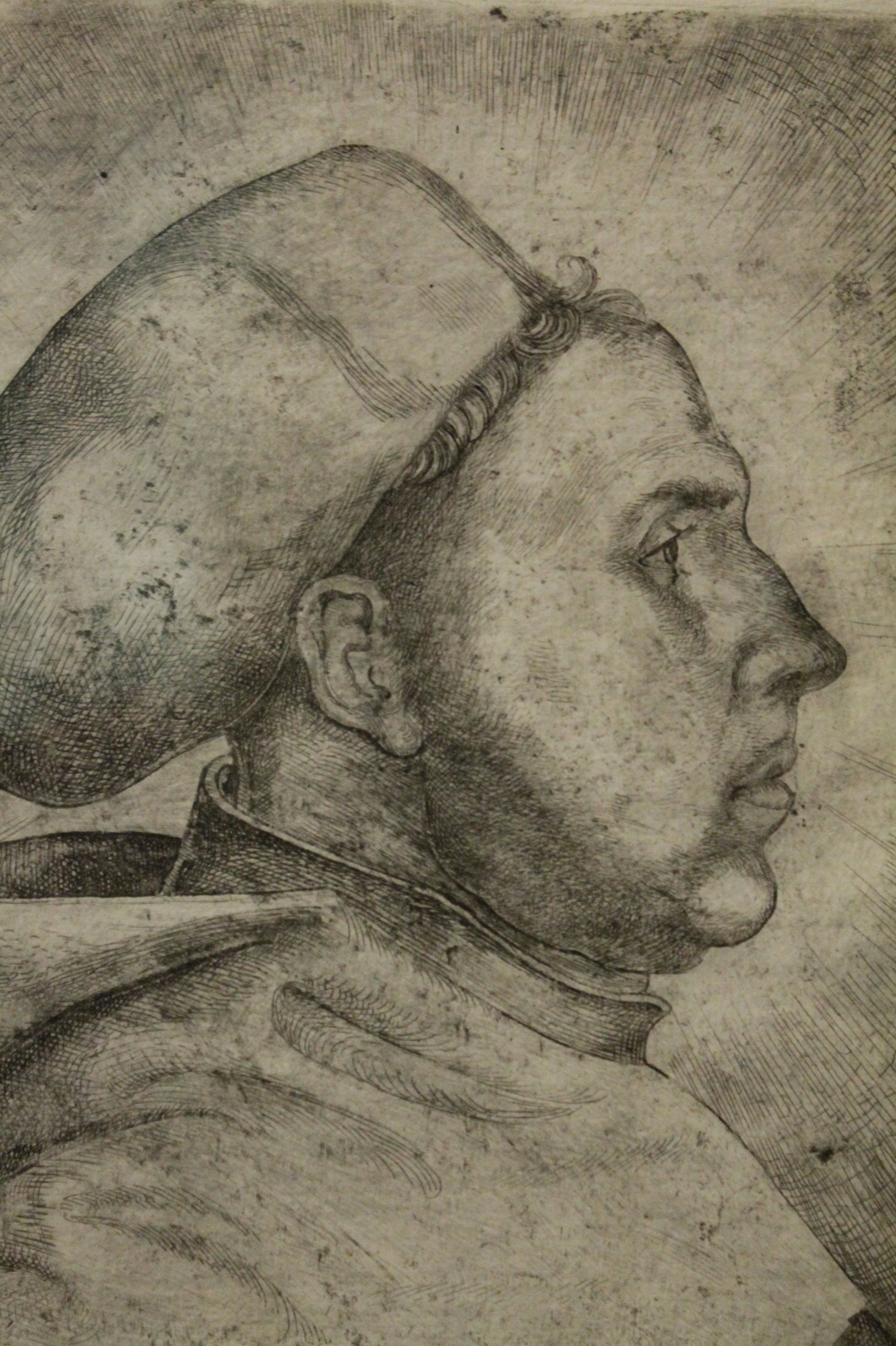
Martin Luther by Hopfer 1523, Martin Luther's House, Wittenberg

Hopfer was born in Kaufbeuren. The son of Anna Sendlerin and painter Bartholomäus Hopfer, Daniel moved to Augsburg early in his life, and acquired citizenship there in 1493. In 1497 he married Justina Grimm, sister of the Augsburg publisher, physician and druggist Sigismund Grimm. The couple had three sons: Jörg, Hieronymus and Lambert, the last two of whom carried on their father's profession of etching, Hieronymus in Nuremberg and Lambert in Augsburg. Jörg's sons Georg and Daniel (junior), also became distinguished etchers, patronised by no less than the Emperor Maximilian II, whose successor, Rudolf II, raised Georg to the nobility.

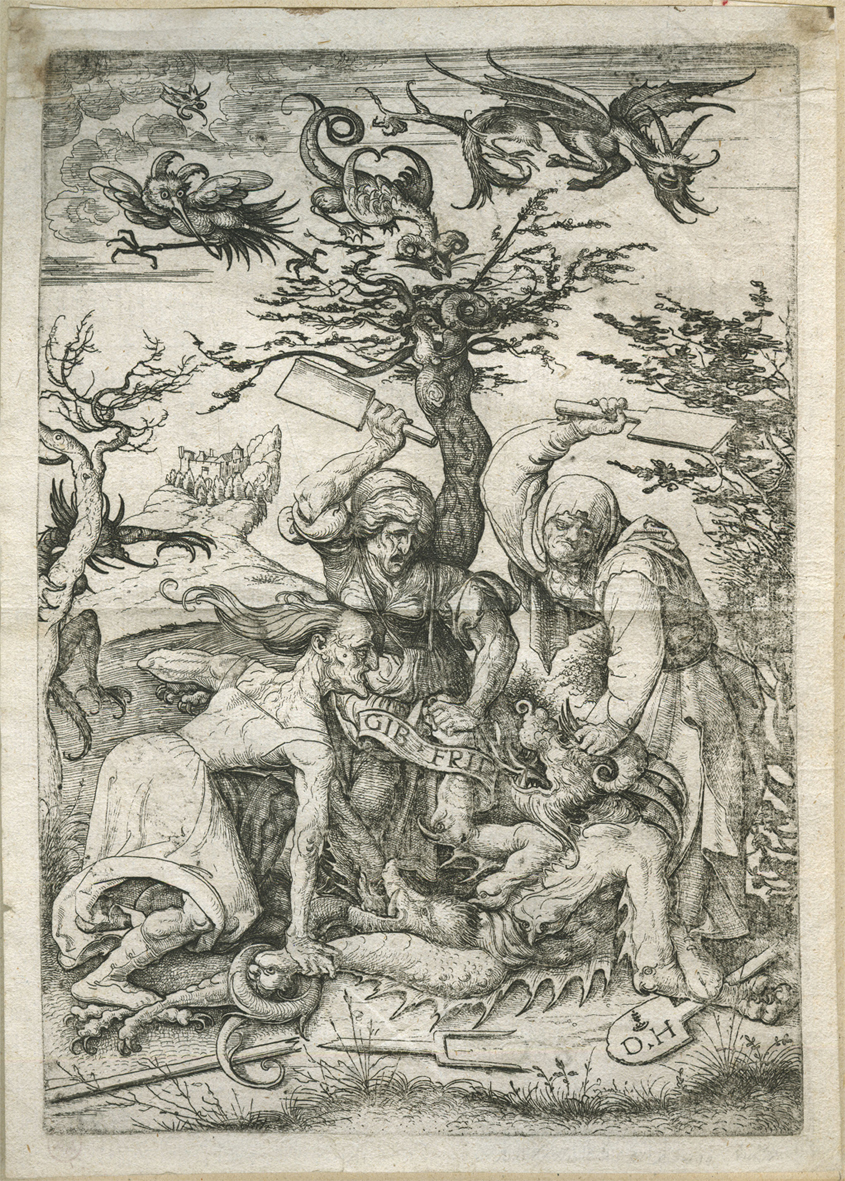
Daniel Hopfer: Gib Frid – three old women beating a devil on the ground. Before the Funck number

Daniel was trained as an etcher of armour. There are only two proven examples of his own work on armour: a shield from 1536 now in the Royal Armoury museum (La Real Armería) of the Royal Palace of Madrid and a sword in the Germanisches Nationalmuseum of Nuremberg. An Augsburg horse armour in the German Historical Museum, Berlin, dating to between 1512 and 1515, is decorated with motifs from Hopfer's etchings and woodcuts, but this is no evidence that Hopfer himself worked on it. The etching of metals with acid was known in Europe from at least 1400, but the elaborate decoration of armour (in Germany at the least) was an art probably imported from Italy around the end of the 15th century — little earlier than the birth of etching as a printmaking technique. Although the first extant dated etchings are the three by Albrecht Dürer of 1515, and despite the fact that none of his works are dated, stylistic evidence suggests that Daniel Hopfer was using this technology as early as 1500. It is often thought that Hopfer taught Dürer the technique.

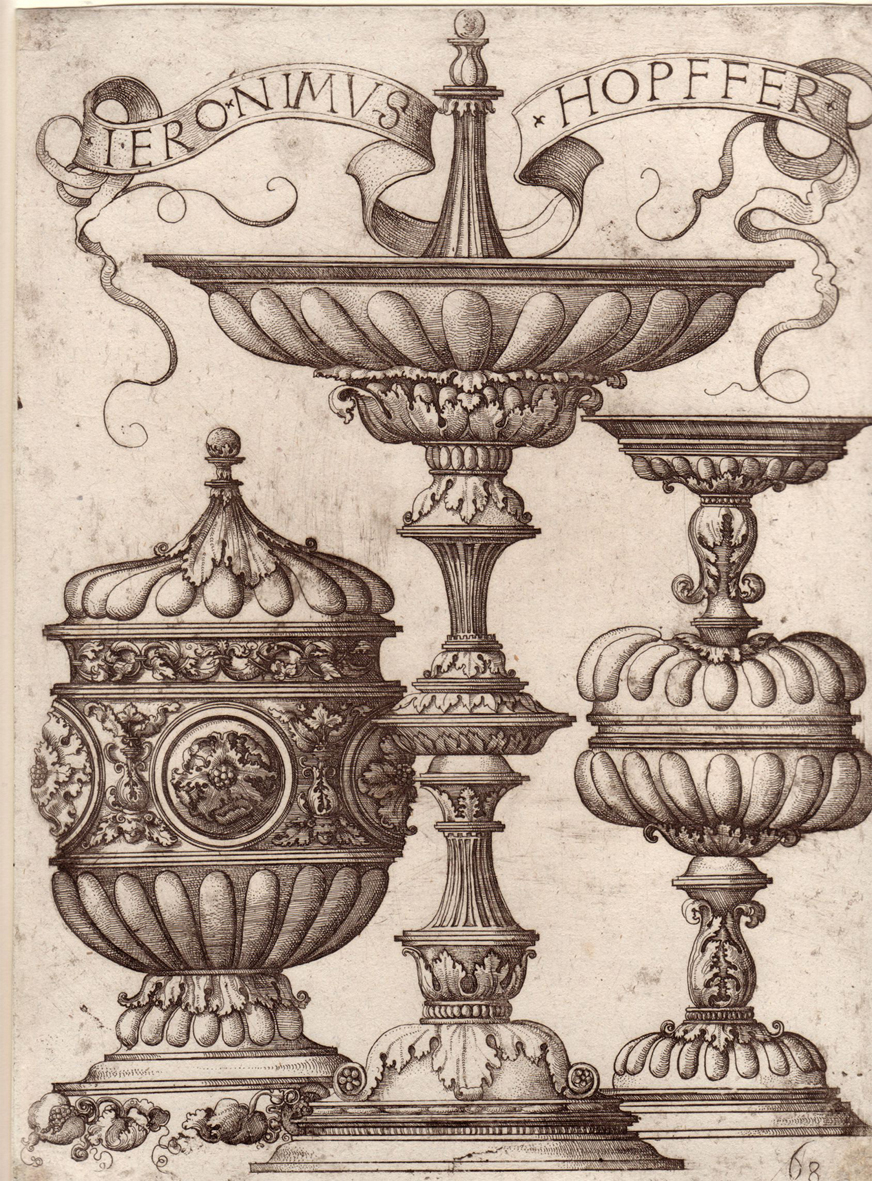
Hieronymus Hopfer: Three ornate vessels, probably a model for goldsmiths. With the Funck number, lower right: "68"

The Hopfers prospered in Augsburg, and by 1505 Daniel owned a house in the city centre. He sat on the committee of the Augsburg guild of smiths, which at this time included painters and etchers, probably because these crafts were uniquely connected in the town, one of Europe's principal manufacturing places of arms and armour.

Daniel died in Augsburg in 1536. His achievements had been widely recognized during his life, and in 1590 he was posthumously named as the inventor of the art of etching, with the imperial patent of nobility bestowed upon his grandson Georg.

== Works ==
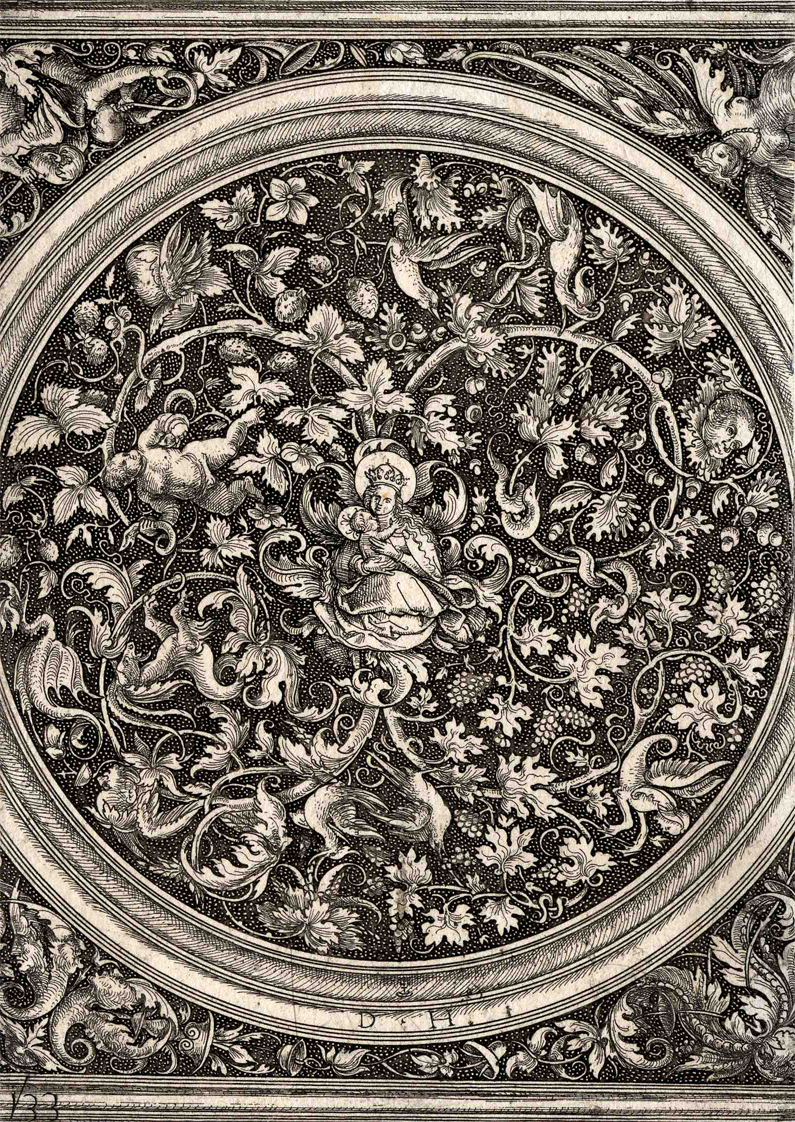
Daniel Hopfer: Mary with Jesus, an example of the "Hopfer style". Note the Funck number lower left: "133".

Daniel Hopfer's early etchings were done in line-work, but he and his sons soon developed more sophisticated techniques, referred to by armour historians as the Hopfer style. Applied to prints, this produced silhouetted designs on a black ground, doubtless by multiple bitings of the plates. The technically demanding procedure seems to have been both delicate and labour-intensive, and no other artists are known to have used this exact method. Their plates were all iron, rather than the copper that the Italians later introduced once appropriate acids had been discovered. Iron plates had to be handled carefully to be kept free of rust, which could develop quickly from even a fingerprint.

None of the Hopfer family were trained artists, or natural draughtsmen: their designs show a certain naïveté that never gained an artistic following. But the extraordinary diversity of the Hopfers' works have made them collector's items. From religious prints to designs for goldsmiths, secular subjects such as peasants, military figures (especially Landsknechts), portraits of contemporary worthies, mytholological and folkloric themes, the sheer range of the Hopfers' productions are both remarkable and unique, designed to appeal to a clientele far wider than the metalsmiths who bought their patterns to create their wares. However, the Hopfer family did not hesitate to plagiarize the work of their contemporaries: of Daniel's 230 known prints, 14 are copies of other masters, mainly Mantegna, whilst only a minority of Hieronymus' 82 plates are his original work — no fewer than 21 are copies of Dürer's works, and around 30 others are copies from Jacopo de' Barbari, Raimondi and Altdorfer among others.

In the next century, David Funck (1642–1705), a distant relative of the Hopfers and a bookseller of Nuremberg, acquired 230 of the Hopfers' iron plates and reprinted these under the title Operae Hopferianae. He added a scratched number, known as the Funck number, to each one, thus creating a second state of the hitherto un-retouched plates.

A further print run of 92 plates was made in 1802 by the publishers C. W. Silberberg of Frankfurt under the title Opera Hopferiana. The quality of the prints is a tribute to the care with which the Hopfer family maintained these rust-prone plates, many of which are now in the Berlin print cabinet.

== Gallery ==
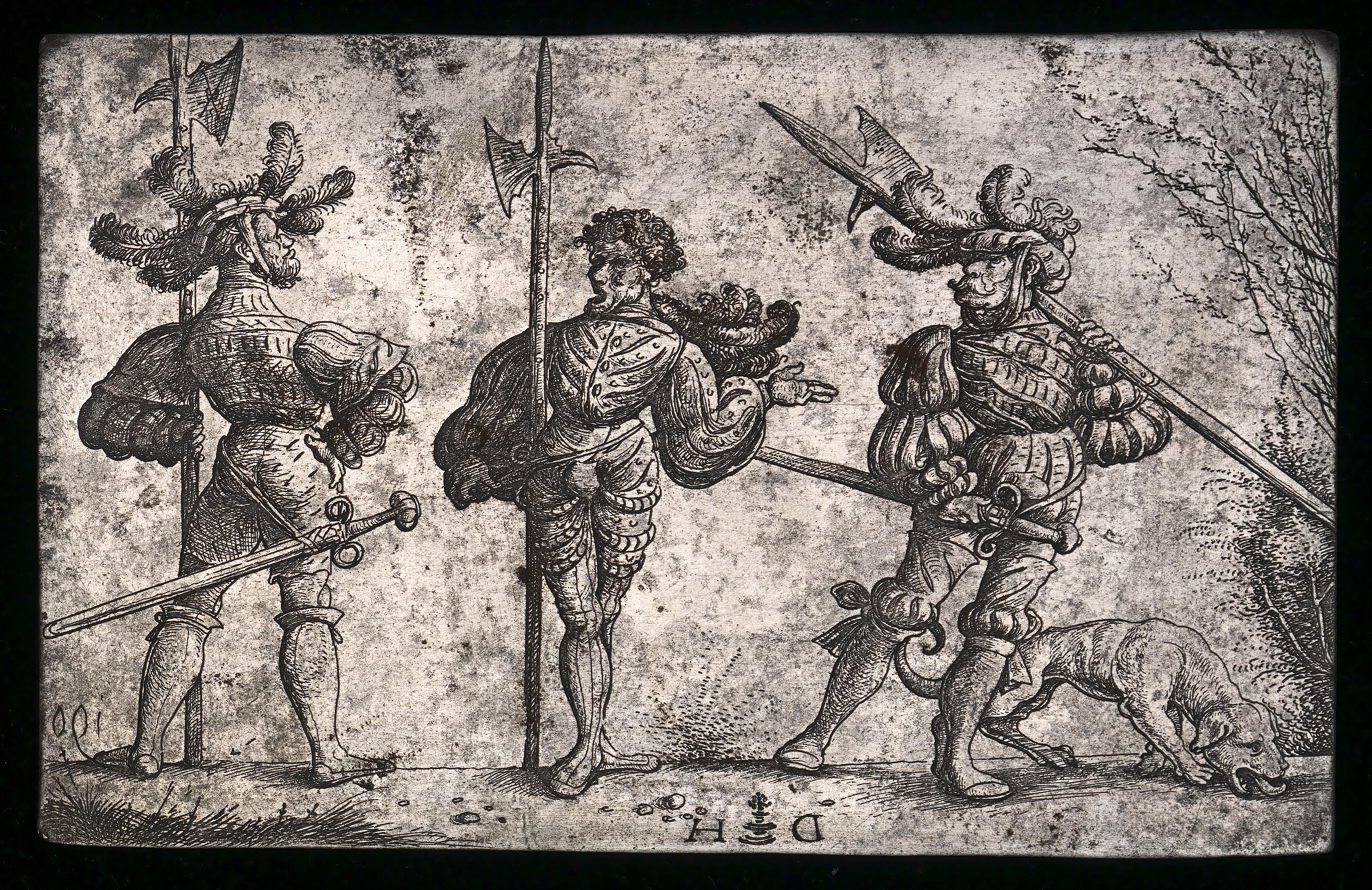
Three German Soldiers Armed with Halberds, c. 1510. An original etched iron plate from which prints would be made. National Gallery of Art

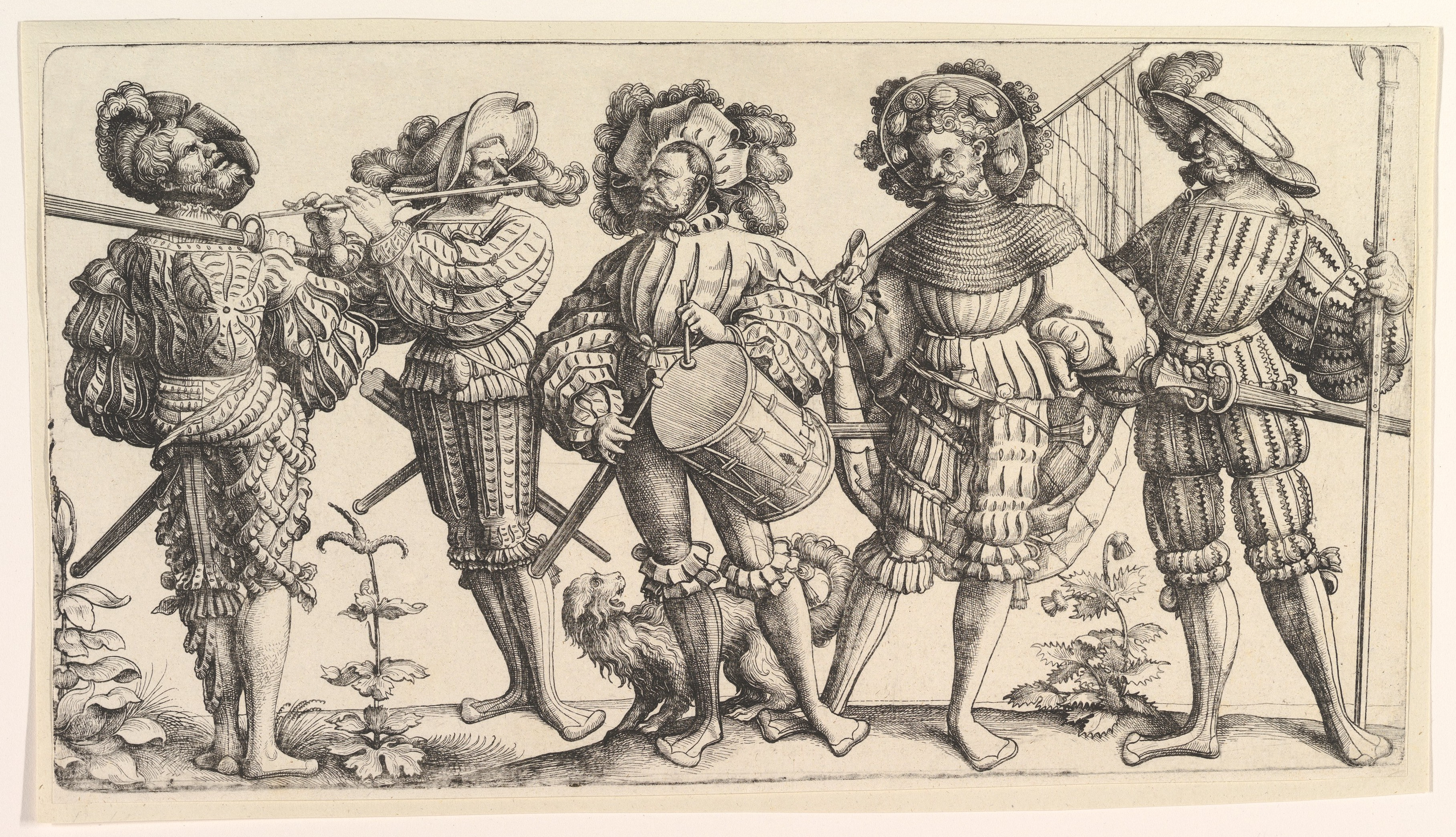
Five Landsknechte 1530

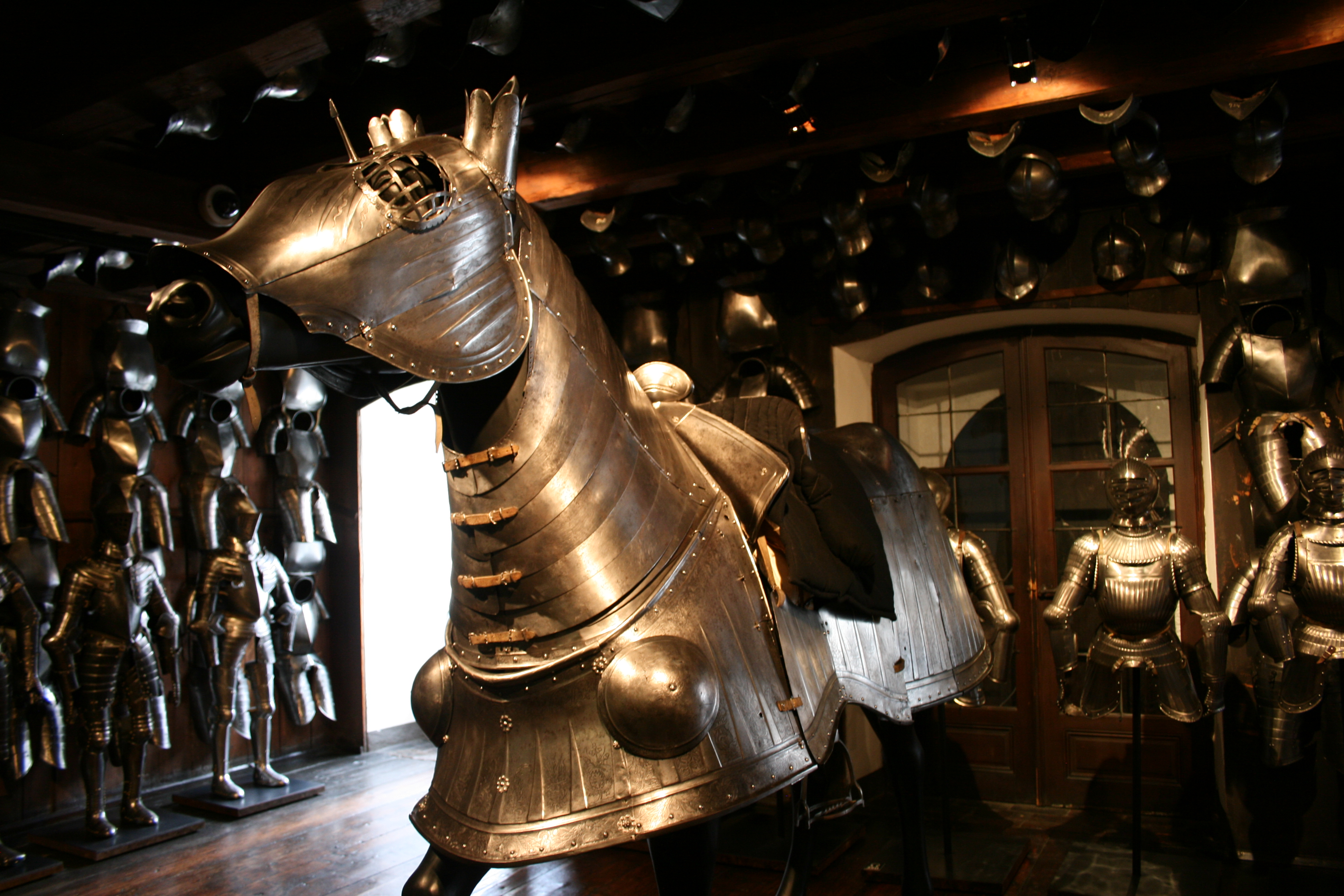
Decorated steedarmor of Daniel Hopfer

== Sources ==
- Daniel Hopfer von Kaufbeuren, Meister zu Augsburg 1493-1536. Ed. Eyssen: Dissertation, Ruprecht-Karls-Universität, Heidelberg, 1904
- Hollstein's German Engravings Etchings and Woodcuts 1400-1700. Vol. XV. A.L. Van Gendt B.V., Blaricum, 1986.
- The Renaissance Print 1470-1550. David Landau and Peter Parchall. Yale University Press, 1994. ISBN 0-300-06883-2
