= Landsknecht =

Type of mercenary infantry in 16th-17th century Europe

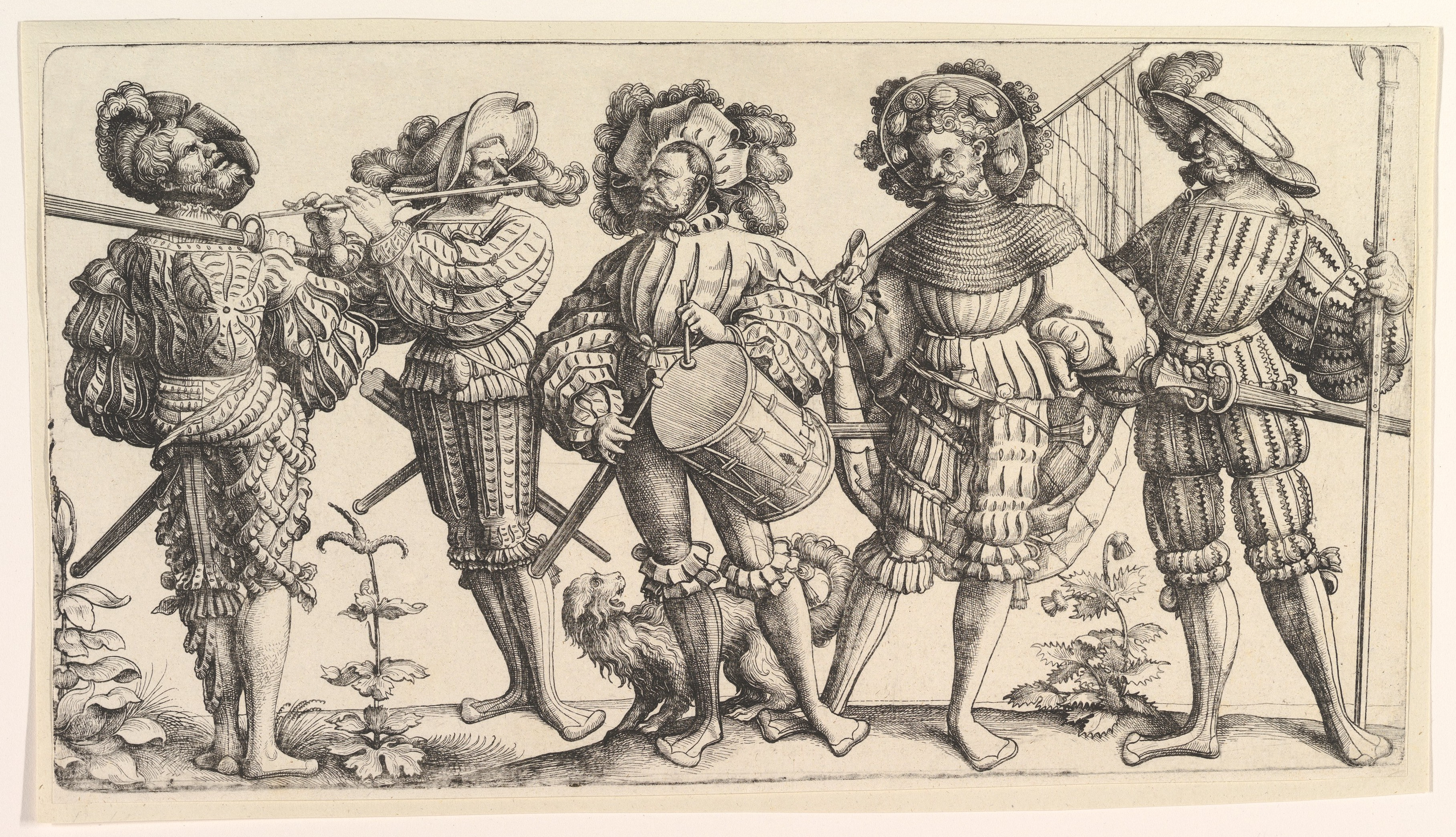
Landsknechte, etching by Daniel Hopfer, c. 1530

The Landsknechte (singular: Landsknecht, pronounced [ˈlantsknɛçt]), also rendered as Landsknechts or Lansquenets, were German mercenaries used in pike and shot formations during the early modern period. Consisting predominantly of pikemen and supporting foot soldiers, their front line was formed by Doppelsöldner ("double-pay men") renowned for their use of Zweihänder and arquebus. They formed the bulk of the Holy Roman Empire's Imperial Army from the late 15th century to the early 17th century, fighting in the Habsburg-Valois wars, the Habsburg-Ottoman wars, and the European wars of religion.

The Landsknechte were well-armed and experienced warriors, recruitable in large numbers throughout Germany and Austria by the Holy Roman Emperor. This guaranteed both quantity and quality to the Imperial military for a century and a half. At their peak during the reign of Charles V of Habsburg, and under the leadership of notable captains such as Georg von Frundsberg and Nicholas of Salm, the Imperial Landsknechts obtained important successes such as the capture of the French King Francis I at the Battle of Pavia in 1525 and the resistance against the Ottoman Turks led by Suleiman the Magnificent at the Siege of Vienna in 1529, while also being responsible for the Sack of Rome in 1527 (committed by unpaid mutinous troops, including Lutherans hostile to the Papacy).

== Etymology ==
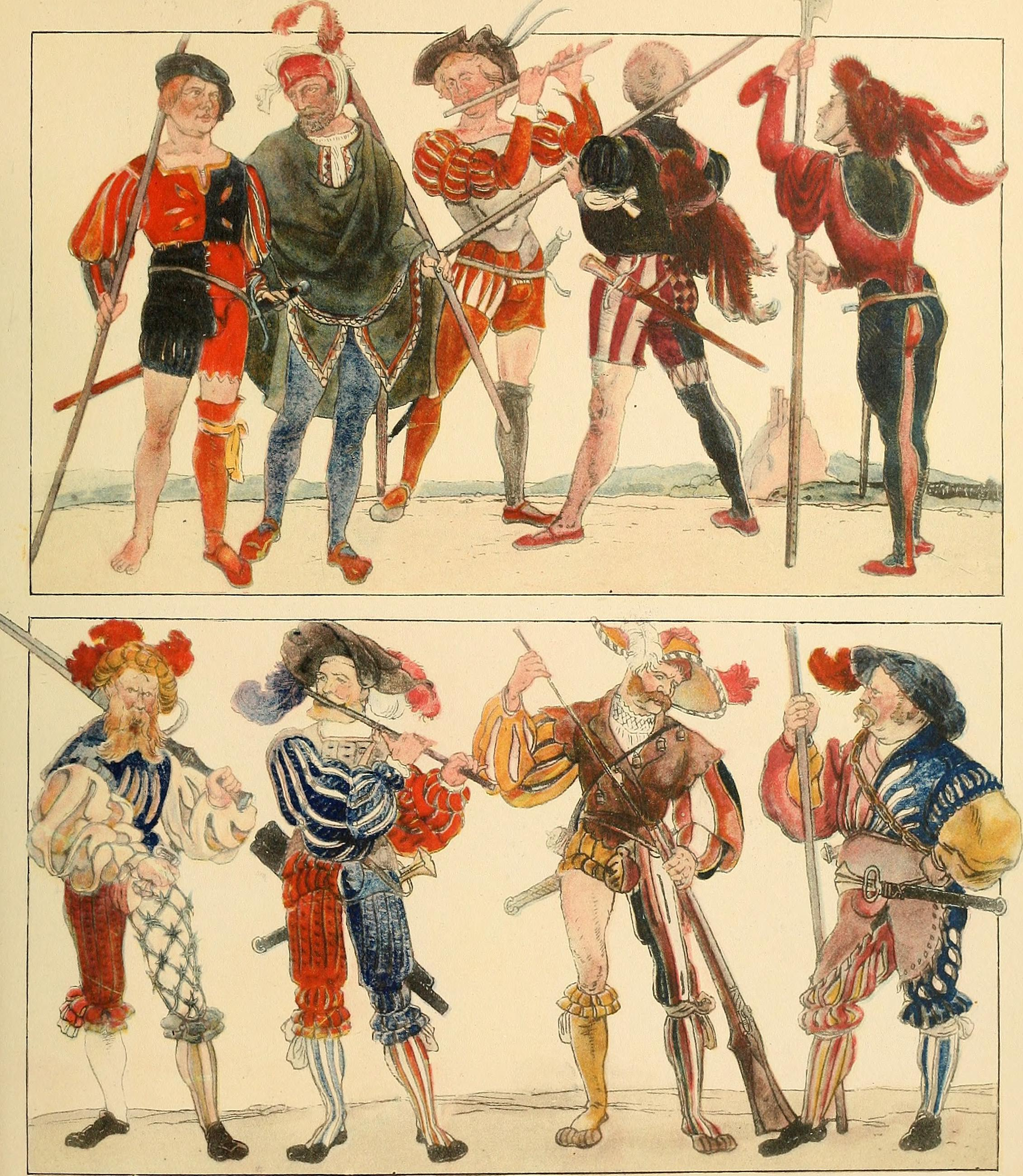
Image of Landsknechte in the Geschichte des Kostüms

The Germanic compound Landsknecht (earlier Lantknecht, without Fugen-"s") combines Land and Knecht to form "servant of the land". The compound Lantknecht was used during the 15th century for bailiffs or court ushers.

The word Landsknecht first appeared in the German language circa 1470 to describe certain troops in the army of Charles, Duke of Burgundy. As early as 1500, the term was morphed into Lanzknecht, referring to the unit's use of the pike as its main weapon.

== History ==
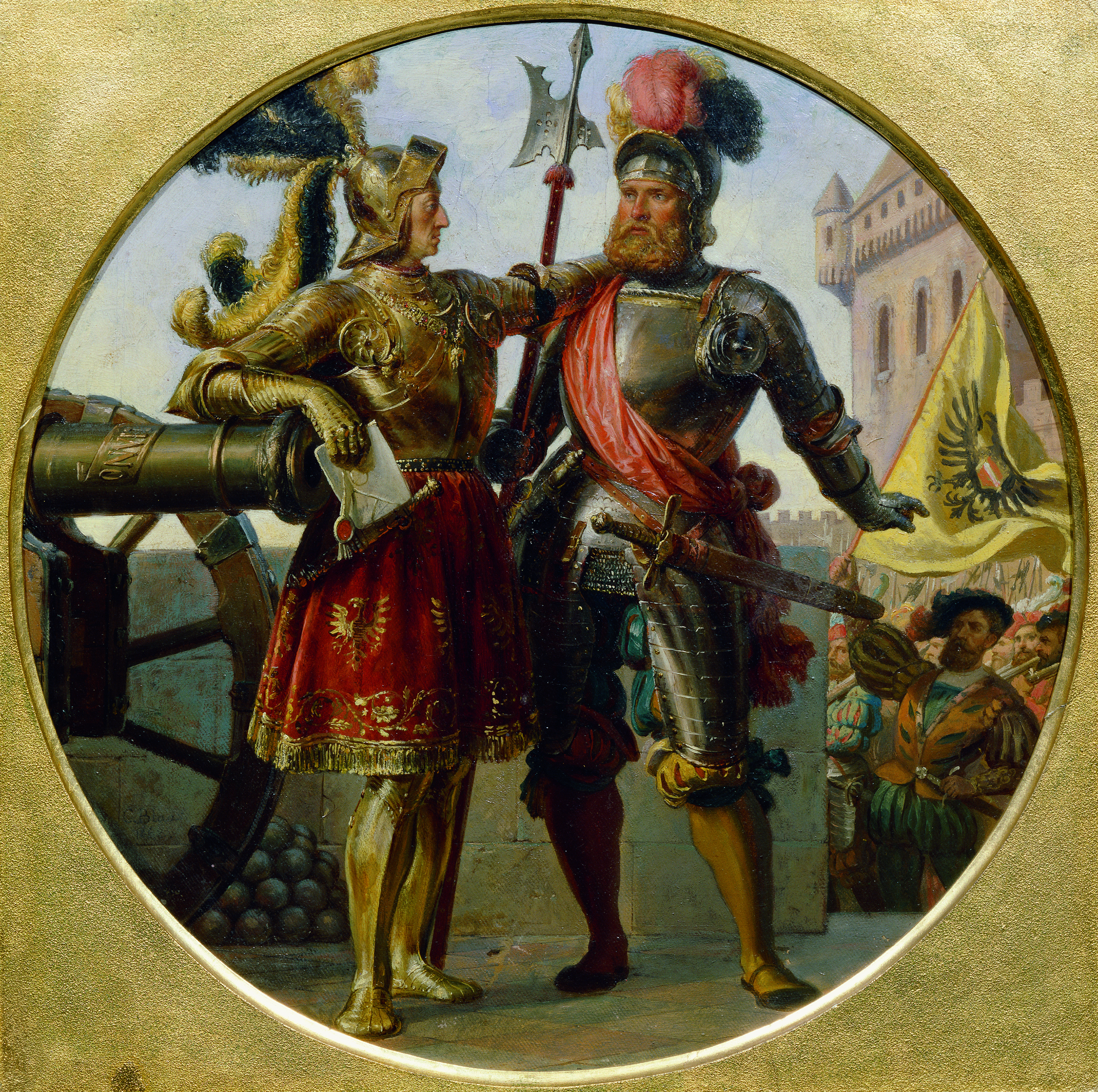
Kaiser Maximilian I. und Georg von Frundsberg, depicting Maximilian I and Georg von Frundsberg, founders of the Landsknechte, by Karl von Blaas. 1868. Kunsthistorisches Museum.

Over the Burgundian Wars, the well-organized and supplied armies of Charles the Bold were defeated again and again by the Old Swiss Confederacy, which wielded an ad hoc militia army. Charles's army lacked esprit de corps because of its composition by feudal lords, mercenaries, and levied gentry. The Swiss army, though poorly organized, were highly motivated, aggressive, and well-trained with their arms. The Swiss pikemen, called Reisläufer, repeatedly defeated and eventually killed Charles, eliminating Burgundy as a European power. Archduke Maximilian, who became co-ruler of Burgundian lands in 1477 by marrying Mary of Burgundy, was greatly influenced by the Swiss victories. When the French contested the inheritance, Maximilian levied a Flemish army and defeated the French in 1479 at the Battle of Guinegate, mixing Swiss-styled square infantry formation and Hussite wagon forts tactics. The dissolution of his levied army at war's end found Maximilian wanting a permanent and organized military force like the Confederation's to protect his domain. The existing Burgundian structure was inadequate to this end, however, and moreover the French wielded a monopoly on the hiring of Reisläufer.

Maximilian began raising the first Landsknecht units in 1486, amassing 6,000–8,000 mercenaries. One of these units he gave to Eitel Friedrich II, Count of Hohenzollern, who trained them with Swiss instructors in Bruges in 1487 to become the "Black Guard" (Note: The Black Guard, formed to defend the Habsburg Low Countries, fought around the North Sea until being annihilated at the Battle of Hemmingstedt after twelve years of service.) – the first Landsknechte. In 1488, Maximilian organized the Swabian League, creating an army of 12,000 infantry and 1,200 cavalry to deter Bavaria and Bohemia. This is considered to be the first Landsknecht army to be raised in Germany. Maximilian raised a strong army for the Austrian-Hungarian War of 1490, and succeeded in driving the Hungarians out of Austria. The Landsknechte in his army refused to serve after sacking Stuhlweissenburg (now Székesfehérvár, Hungary), citing lack of pay and stopping Maximilian's advance on Buda. To prevent a repeat of Stuhlweissenburg, Maximilian now sought to homogenize the Landsknechte into a fully professional, and mostly Germanic military force.

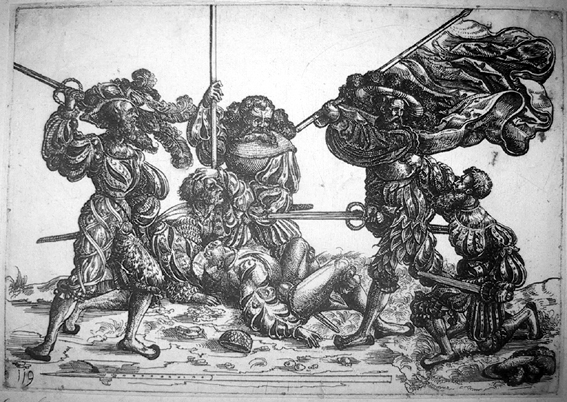
Standard bearer fighting against five Landsknechte (etching by Daniel Hopfer)

In the 1490s, the well-trained Landsknechte managed to defeat significantly greater Frisian armies. Paul Dolnstein wrote of the siege of Älvsborg Fortress in July 1502, fighting for the king of Denmark: "We were 1800 Germans, and we were attacked by 15000 Swedish farmers ... we struck most of them dead." After the Battle of Novara in 1513, the Swiss executed the hundreds of German Landsknecht mercenaries they had captured who had fought for the French. At the Battle of Bicocca and the Battle of Marignano (1515), the Landsknecht performed well, defeating the famed Reisläufer.

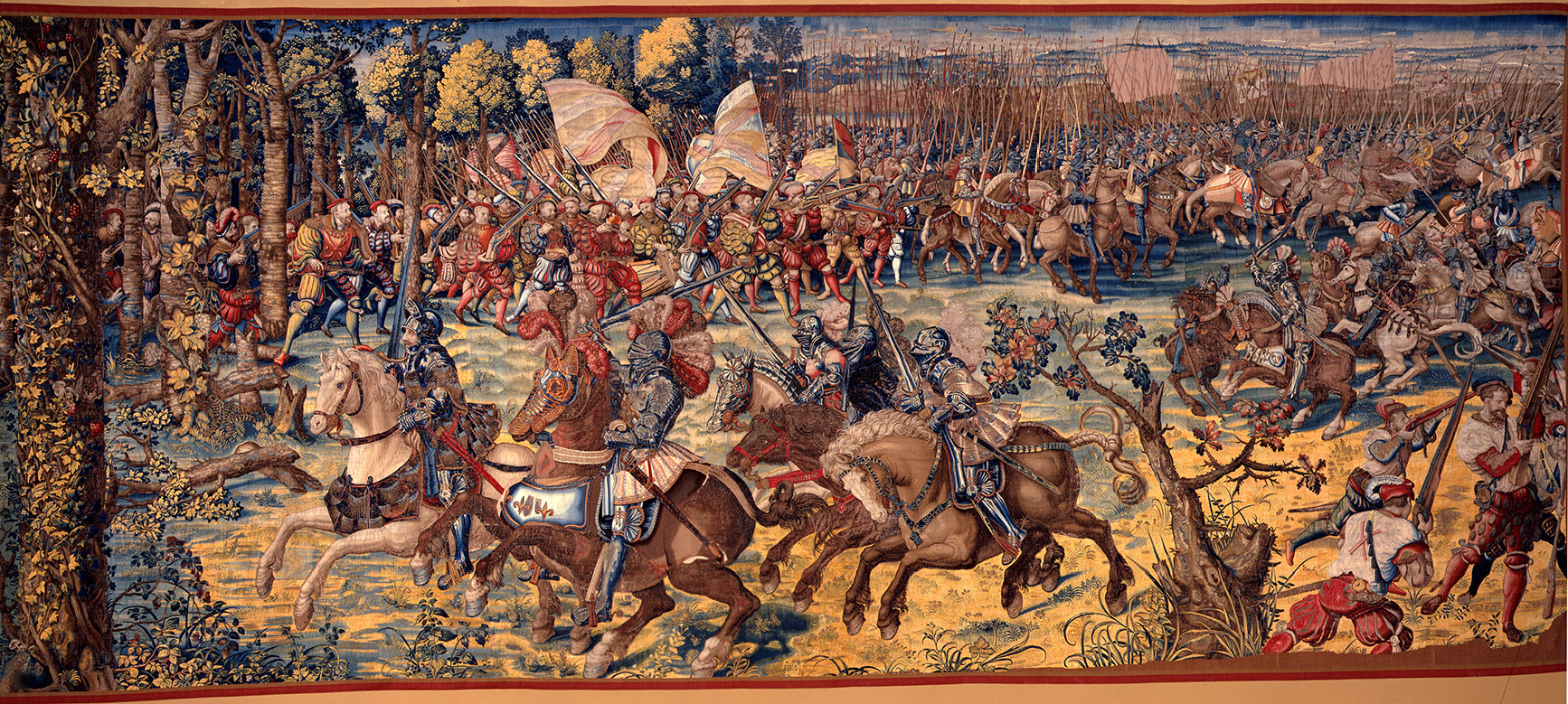
Landsknecht mercenaries with arquebuses (Tapestries of the Battle of Pavia by Bernard van Orley, between 1528 and 1531)

The Imperial Landsknechte were instrumental in many of the Emperor's victories, including the decisive Battle of Pavia in 1525. The same year, they also managed to defeat the peasants' revolt in the Empire. At their peak in the early 16th century, the Landsknechte were considered formidable soldiers who were often brave and loyal. However, these qualities may have declined afterward. The Landsknechte were also employed by the Habsburg emperor and the royal Valencian authorities in the suppression of the First Revolt of Espadà of 1526, which took place in the mountains of Espadà, in modern-day Spanish Castelló province (then in the Aragonese Kingdom of Valencia), where thousands of Valencian Muslim fellahs took up arms against the decree of forced conversion issued that very year by the emperor.

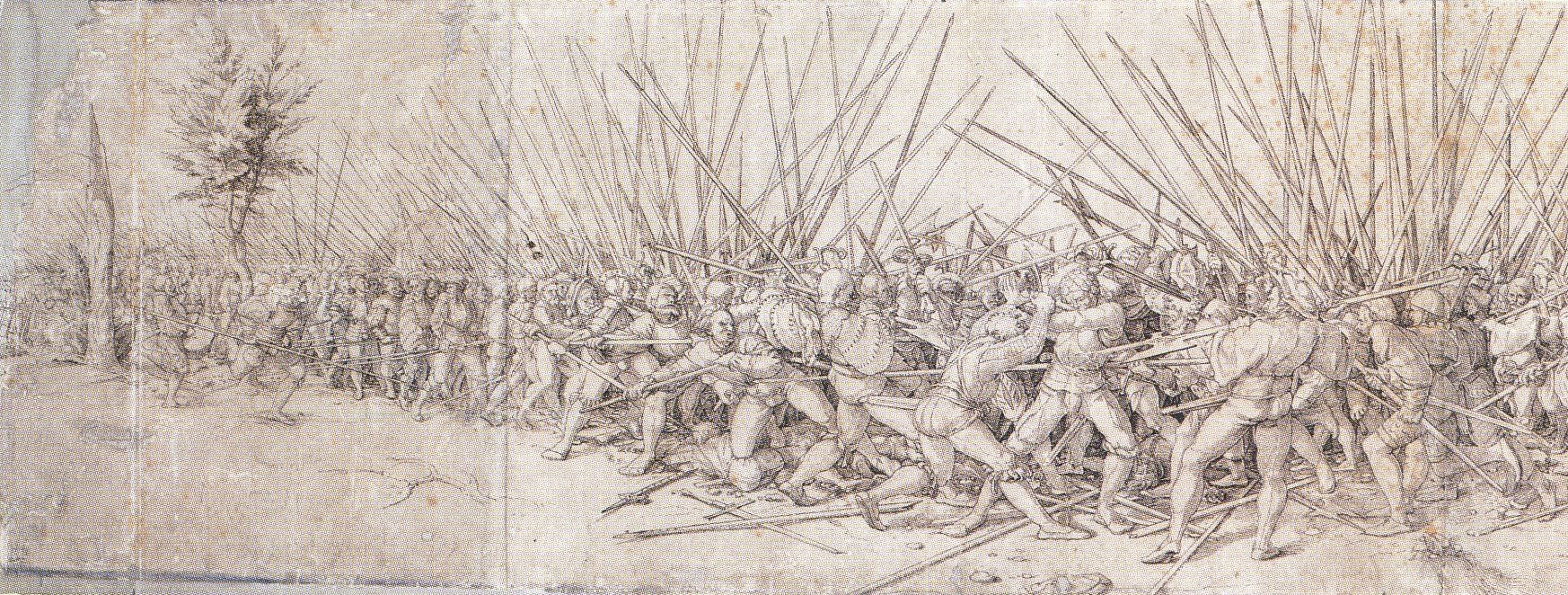
Reisläufer and Landsknechte engaged in a push of pike (engraving by Hans Holbein the Younger, early 16th century)

They are attested as deployed in the armies of Kings John III of Navarre and successor Henry II of Navarre during their campaigns to reconquer Navarre (1512–1524). In the same context, they are also found fighting on Charles V's side (battle for Hondarribia, 1521–1524) where they performed strongly. They also served in high numbers in the Imperial army during the campaigns of Austria (1532), France (1542), Germanic Reformed League (1547) and in of all the Italian wars. Others also fought on the Habsburg-Ottoman frontier.

The army of the Holy Roman Emperor defeated the French army in Italy, but funds were not available to pay the soldiers. The 34,000 Imperial troops mutinied and forced their commander, Charles III, Duke of Bourbon, to lead them towards Rome. The Sack of Rome in 1527 was executed by some 6,000 Spaniards under the Duke, 14,000 Landsknechte under Georg von Frundsberg, some Italian infantry and some cavalry.

Terence McIntosh comments that the expansionist, aggressive policy pursued by Maximilian I and Charles V at the inception of the early modern German nation (although not to further the aims specific to the German nation per se), mainly relying on German manpower as well as utilizing fearsome Landsknecht and other mercenaries (with the Battle of Pavia and atrocities like the Sack of Rome being associated with them), would affect the way neighbours viewed the German polity, although in the longue durée, Germany tended to be at peace.

From the 1560s on, after the death of Frundsberg, the reputation of the Landsknechte steadily decreased. In the French Wars of Religion and the Eighty Years War, their bravery and discipline came under criticism, and the Spanish elements of the army of Flanders regularly deprecated the battlefield usefulness of the Landsknechte, somewhat unfairly. Their status also suffered from the rising reputation of the dreaded Spanish tercios who, however, were far less abundant and more expensive to train. When serving in southern Europe, Landsknechte were still considered elite troops. In the army of the Dutch rebels, many German mercenaries were hired but were forced to give up some Landsknecht traditions in order to increase their discipline in river crossing and their naval fighting abilities. Increasing ill-discipline within the ranks saw them replaced with an improved system of raising a German army, the Kaiserlicher Fussknecht, which was far less reliant on mercenaries.

== Organization and recruitment ==
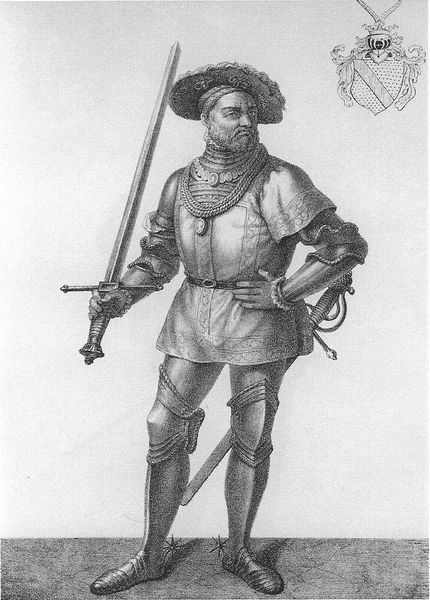
Ernst Friedrich, Margrave of Baden-Durlach, wearing Landsknecht dress. His greaves, however, are atypical of Landsknecht.

The Landsknechte, often recruited from South Germany, came from a society with exploding population growth, increasing unemployment, diverse cultural factors and depleting hierarchical structure (unlike the tightly organized society of the Swiss). In addition to dispossessed craftmen and peasants, there were burghers, aristocrats and runaway serfs as well. They were also used to freedom of carrying weapons. The result was that soldiers leaned towards a libertine (and also brutal) lifestyle. Thus, the role of the regiment, leadership by example (commanders tended to dismount to fight with the troops) and harsh discipline (involving capital punishment) were emphasized to compensate.

As with the Reisläufer, a regiment (a typical Landsknecht regiment consisted of 4,000 men) of Landsknechte was raised by a lord with a letter patent (Bestallungsbrief) that named the unit colonel (Obrist). This document laid out the size and structure of the unit, the pay of its men, and contained its Articles of War (Artikelsbriefe). Upon accepting the commission and securing funding, either through a bank loan or a grant from the lord, the colonel assembled his chain of command. His captains, once appointed, would then go to a locality he knew with drummers and fifers. Recruits gathered at a specified place and time for the muster. There, they would parade under an arch and be inspected by the colonel and his captains, then be paid their first month's salary. The colonel next read the Bestallungsbrief in full to the soldiers, who then swore oaths of allegiance to cause, officers, and the Emperor. This ceremony also saw the appointing of the unit staff and its standard bearers, or Fähnriche (ensigns), who swore to never lose the standard.

The colonel was the highest–ranking officer in a regiment, but if his force contained more than one regiment he could become a Generalobrist. If it contained cavalry and artillery in addition to its infantry, then he could be a Feldobrist or Generalfeldobrist. The regiment would be commanded by a lieutenant colonel in the colonel's stead. The regiment itself was formed by ten Fähnlein, equivalent to a company and commanded by a captain. A Fähnlein was made up by 400 men, including 100 veterans. Rotten, equivalent to a platoon, were the building blocks of the Fähnlein and contained either ten ordinary Landsknechte or six Doppelsöldner, led by a Rottmeister elected by his unit. In totality, the regiment averaged 4,000 men; (Note: "Regiment" originally referred to the force the colonel controlled, but by 1550 meant a formation of 3,000–5,000 men.) ten Fähnlein, containing 40 Rotten. Unit sergeant majors, called Feldweibel, were tasked with training drill and formation. The regimental sergeant major, Oberster-Feldweibel was responsible for drill on the battlefield. Rotten sergeants, Weibel, were charged with ensuring discipline and relaying liaisons between enlisted men and their officers. One of these men, the Gemeinweibel, was the spokesman for the men and was elected monthly.

According to Imperial law, a colonel could have a staff of 22 officers but in practice this depended on the colonel's wealth. Included in that staff were a chaplain, a scribe, a doctor, a scout, his personal quartermaster and ensign, a drummer and fifer, and a bodyguard (Trabanten) of eight men. Captains also had a staff that included much of the same, but with additional musicians and two Doppelsöldner to protect him. A provost marshal and Schultheiss were appointed by the colonel to maintain military discipline and to prosecute the Artikelsbriefe respectively. The provost was unimpeachable, and feared. Harsh punishments could be expected for offenses such as mutiny or drunkenness on duty. A provost had a retinue of a jailer, bailiff, and executioner (Freimann).

=== Equipment ===
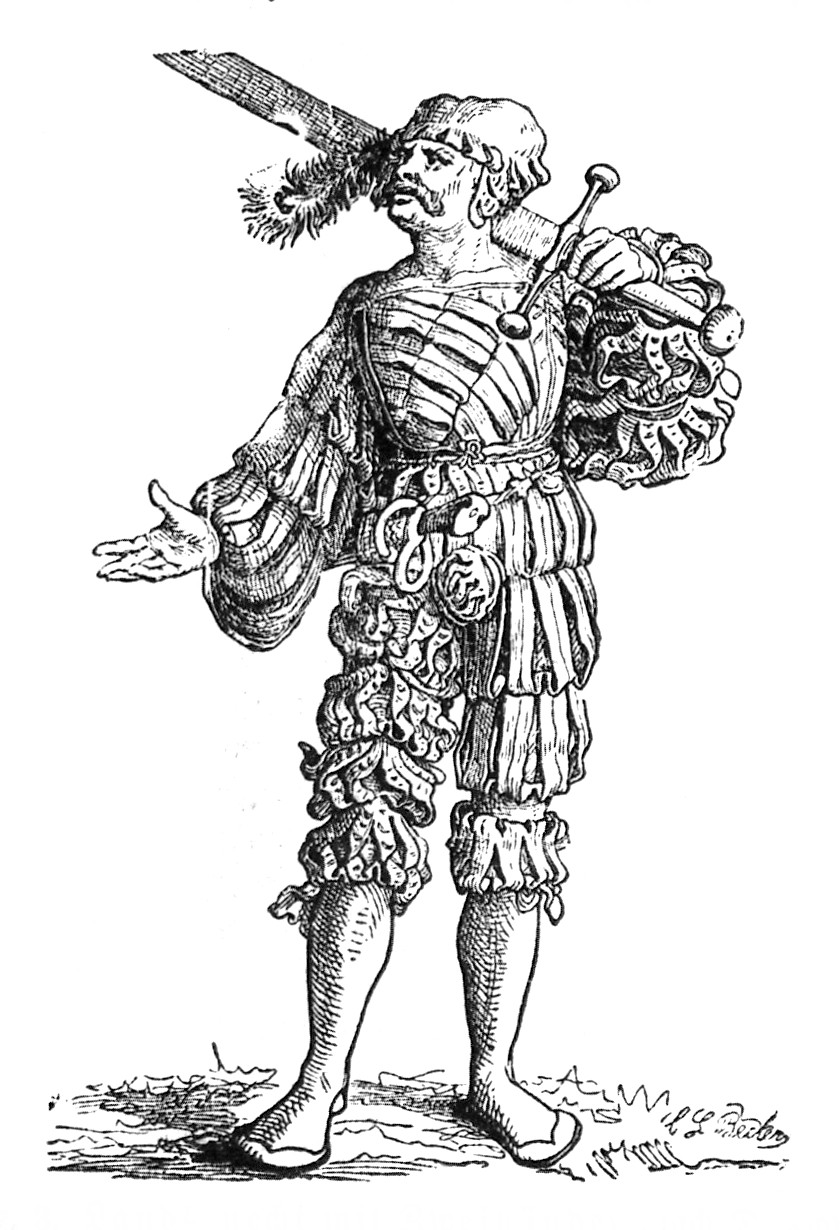
Landsknecht with a Zweihänder

Just like the Reisläufer, Landsknecht formations consisted of men trained and armed with pikes, halberds, and swords. 300 men of a Fähnlein would be armed with a pike, though a Landsknecht's pike was generally shorter than a Reisläufer's at about 4.2 meters (14 ft). Experienced and well-equipped soldiers, receiving double a normal Landsknecht's pay and getting the title Doppelsöldner, made up a quarter of each Fähnlein. 50 of these men were armed with a halberd or with a 66-inch (170 cm) two-handed sword called a Zweihänder while another fifty were arquebusiers or crossbowmen. The focus on firearms, rather than crossbows, as ordained by Maximilian, was where they were different from the Swiss. Maximilian abolished the crossbow in military use in 1517 (although other countries continued to use them). Most Landsknechte, regardless of primary weapon, carried a short sword called a Katzbalger for close combat. By the end of the 16th century, however, the number of pikemen in a Fähnlein had diminished to around 200.

=== Tactics ===
They also copied the Swiss in tactics. Landsknechte fought in a pike square they called the gevierte Ordnung, forty to sixty men deep. Doppelsöldnern made up the formation's first two ranks. Then came the ensigns, and then the squares themselves. Pikemen, supported by halberdiers, formed the square while swordsmen made up their front and rear. The most experienced soldiers were located at the back of the formation and arquebusiers were placed on its flanks. In the attack, a band of soldiers called a forlorn hope preceded the pike square to break enemy pikes.

The pikemen were supported by halberdiers, who would rush a gap in an opposing line, a tactic also copied from the Swiss. As their solidarity grew, commanders emphasized finesse and timing, rather than the head-down battering charge of the Swiss.

As the Landsknechte's fighting techniques were developed, they no longer preferred fighting along a straight line (as exercised by even the Swiss until the end of the fifteenth century), but leaned towards a circle-wise movement that enhanced the use of the space around the combatant and allowed them to attack the opponents from different angles. The circle-wise formation described by Jean Molinet as the "snail" would become the hallmark of Landsknechte's combat. The new types of combat also required the maintenance of a stable bodily equilibrium. Maximilian, an innovator of these types of movements, also saw value in their effects over the maintenance of group discipline (apart from the control of centralised institutions). As Maximilian and his commanders sought to popularize these forms of movements (which only became daily practice at the end of the fifteenth century and gained dominance after Maximilian's death in 1519), he promoted them in tournaments, in fencing and in dancing as well. The courtly festivals became a playground for innovations, foreshadowing developments in military practices.

== Camp ==
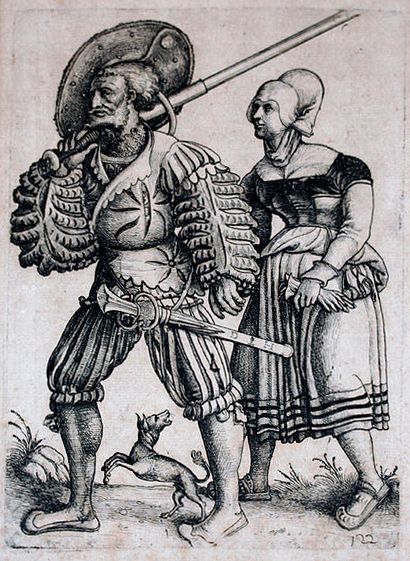
Landsknecht with his Wife, by Daniel Hopfer. Note the Zweihänder over his shoulder and the smaller Katzbalger at his hip.

The Tross were the camp followers or baggage train who travelled with each Landsknecht unit, carrying military necessities, the food, and the belongings of each soldier and his family. The Tross was made up of women, children and some craftsmen. Women and young boys set up Landsknecht camps, cooked, mended injuries, and dug and cleaned latrines. A Landsknecht was usually forbidden by his Bestallungsbrief from having more than one woman in the baggage train. The Tross was overseen by a "whore's sergeant" (Hurenweibel).

== See also ==
- Peter Hagendorf, a Landsknecht whose diary from 1625 to 1649 has survived
- Burgmann
- Feldhauptmann
- Free company
- Free corps
- Heerhaufen
- Kabukimono, samurai gangs also known for their extravagant dress
- Lansquenet, a card-game with the French spelling of Landsknecht
- Loggia dei Lanzi, named after Landsknechte
