= Zweihänder =

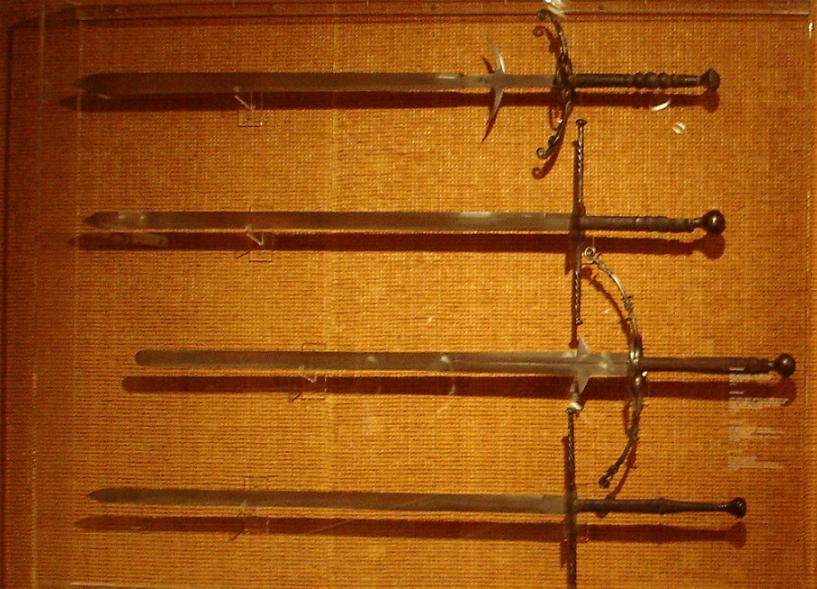
- Zweihänder with and without Parierhaken
- Type: Two-handed sword

Service history
- In service: ~1500–1600

Production history
- Produced: ~1500–present

Specifications
- Mass: 2 to 4 kg (4.4 to 8.8 lb)
- Length: up to 213 cm (84 in)
- Blade type: Double-edged, straight bladed
- Hilt type: Two-handed cruciform, with pommel

The Zweihänder (German pronunciation: [t͡svaɪhɛndɐ], literally 'two-hander'; pl. Zweihänder), also Doppelhänder ('double-hander'), Beidhänder ('both-hander'), Bihänder, or Bidenhänder, is a large two-handed sword that was used primarily during the 16th century.

Zweihänder swords developed from the longswords of the Late Middle Ages and became the hallmark weapon of the German Landsknechte from the time of Maximilian I (d. 1519) and during the Italian Wars of 1494–1559. The Goliath Fechtbuch (1510) shows an intermediate form between longsword and Zweihänder.

This represented the final stage in the trend of making very large swords, which started in the 14th century, and ended in the 16th century. In its developed form, the Zweihänder acquired the handling characteristics of a polearm rather than a sword due to its increased size and weight, therefore adding to its striking power and longer reach. Consequently, it was not carried in a sheath, but across the shoulder like a pike or halberd.

== Morphology ==
Due to their length and weight, which was typically at least 140 centimetres (55 in) and around two kilograms (4.4 lb), Zweihänder required two hands, as the name implies; as such they require at least 25 cm (9.8 in) for the hilt. Zweihänder that were four kilograms (8.8 lb) in weight or more were confined to parade and ceremonial use.

Early Zweihänder were simply larger versions of longswords. Later examples had Parierhaken ('parrying hooks') at the top of the ricasso as well as side rings on the hilt. Swords continued to be made without one or both features. Some Zweihänder had wavy blades, and were called Flammenschwerter (lit. 'flame swords').

== Historical use ==
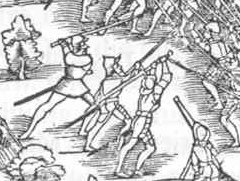
1548 depiction of a Zweihänder used against pikes in the Battle of Kappel

The Zweihänder is mostly associated with Swiss and German mercenaries known as Landsknechte. While the Swiss outlawed use of the weapon, other Landsknechte kept using it until much later.

It is sometimes claimed that holding the title Meister des langen Schwertes ('Master of the Long Sword'), issued by the Mark Brotherhood, entitled Zweihänder wielders to double pay (Doppelsöldner). However, the veracity of this claim is disputed.

The Black Band of German mercenaries (active during the 1510s and 1520s) included 2,000 two-handed swordsmen in a total strength of 17,000 men. Zweihänder-wielders fought with and against pike formations, as the weight and extended reach compared to traditional swords allowed one to either force polearms out of the way, or cut the tip off entirely, when breaching polearm formations.

The Frisian hero Pier Gerlofs Donia is reputed to have wielded a Zweihänder with such skill, strength and efficiency that he managed to behead several people with it in a single blow. A Zweihänder ascribed to him is, as of 2008, on display in the collection of the Fries Museum. It has a length of 213 centimetres (84 in) and a mass of about 6.6 kilograms (15 lb). While it dates to the correct period and was used in battle, there is no documentary link to "Grutte Pier" himself.

== Modern practice ==
Some modern historical European martial arts groups focusing on the German longsword styles use a Zweihänder called Feder as historical training weapon.

These simulators have less pronounced Parierhaken which are called Schilde ('shields'), as they catch opposing blades. The Schild often also acts as ricasso, becoming smoother and thicker after the blade-catchers have been passed. Additionally, some modern simulators extend the crossguards.

== Gallery ==
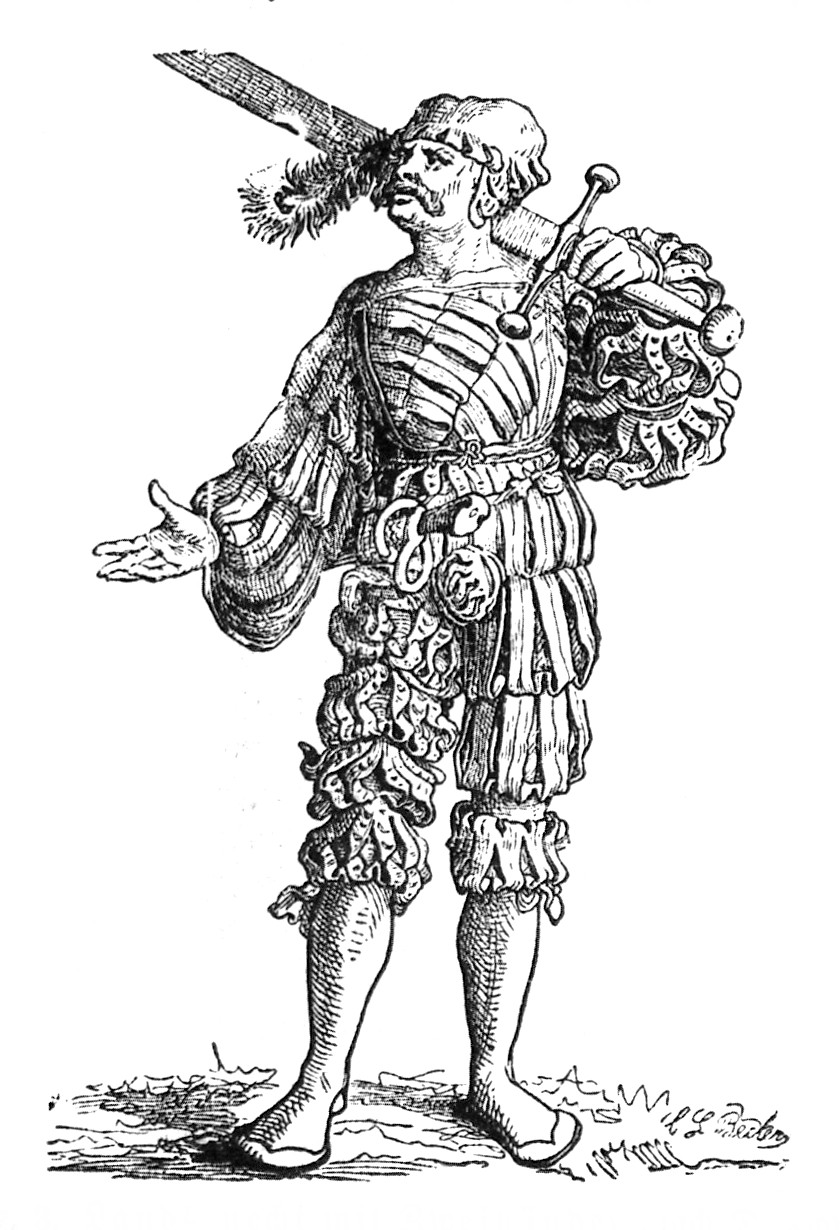
A landsknecht with Zweihänder

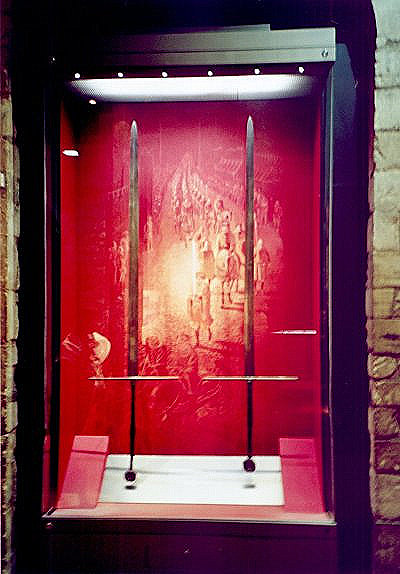
Large two-handed swords in the White Tower (Tower of London)

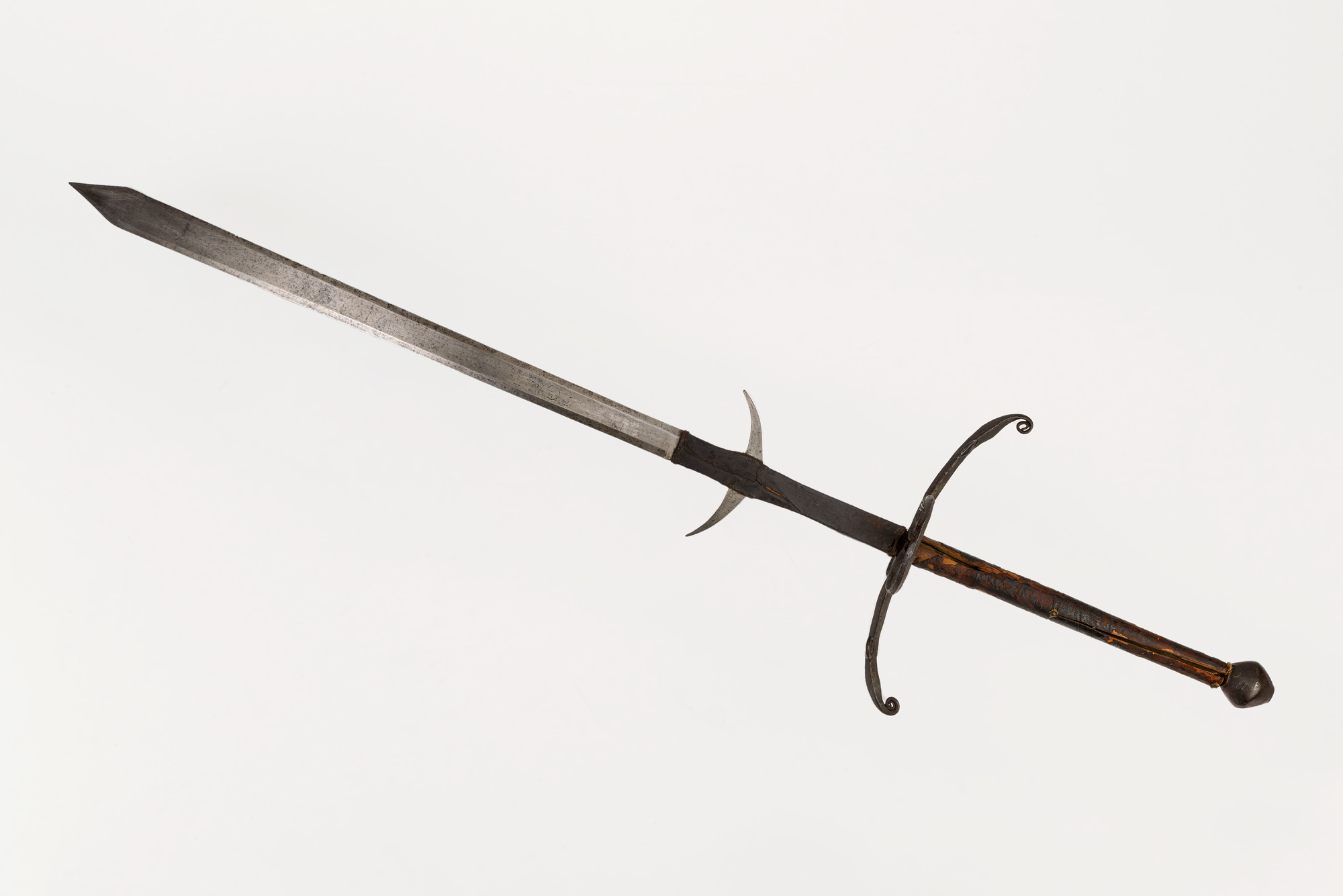
Zweihänder in Athens War Museum

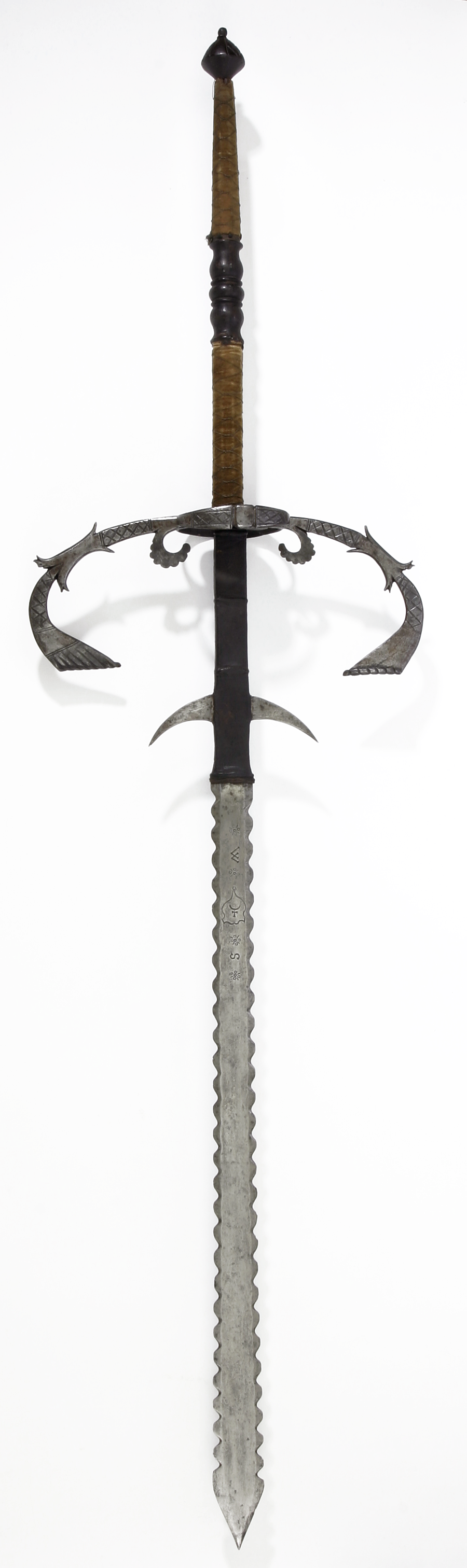
Zweihänder exhibited in Livrustkammaren, Stockholm

== See also ==
- Montante
- Claymore
- Greatsword
- Nagamaki
- Ōdachi
- Miaodao
