= Doppelsöldner =

Type of German mercenary soldier

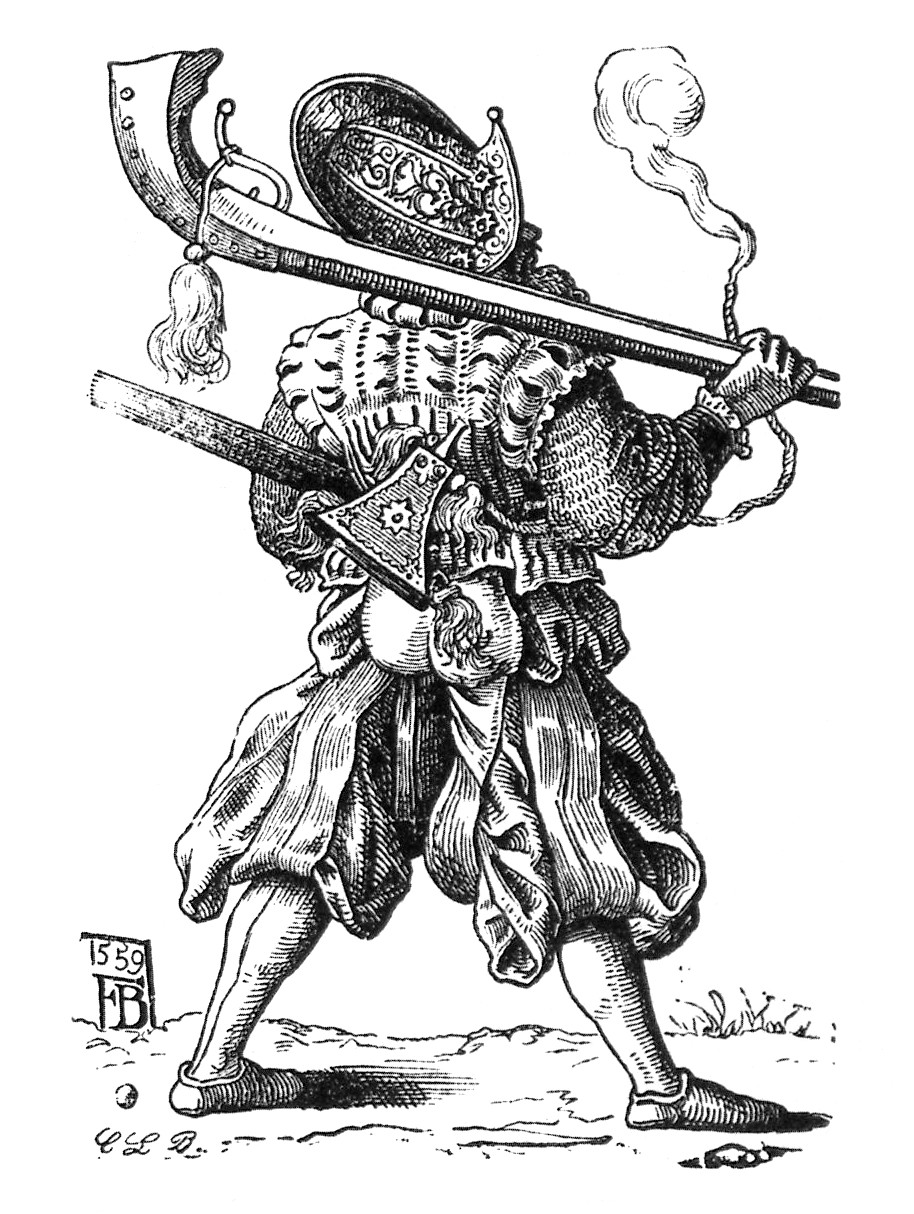
A Doppelsöldner with arquebus

Doppelsöldner ("double-mercenaries", "double-pay men", from German doppel- meaning double, Söldner meaning mercenary) were Landsknechte in 16th-century Germany who volunteered to fight in the front line, taking on extra risk, in exchange for double payment. The stated ratio was that one Landsknecht in four would be a Doppelsöldner. The Doppelsöldner of each company were usually issued with ranged weapons, such as a crossbow or an arquebus, and arranged in the wings of a square, in front of the pikemen.

== Purported Zweihänder use ==
It has been suggested that Landsknechte trained in the use of the Zweihänder ("two-hander") sword qualified as Doppelsöldner, and that proficiency was demonstrated by holding the title Master of the Longsword from the Brotherhood of Saint Mark. However, while some Doppelsöldner may have used the Zweihänder and both the brotherhood and the title existed, no primary source confirms a direct connection, indicating that this link is likely a later myth.

The Zweihänder is said to have been used by the Doppelsöldner to break through formations of pikemen, especially Swiss pikemen, by either being swung to break the ends of the pikes themselves or to knock them aside and attack the pikemen directly. The veracity of this tradition is disputed, but it dates back at least to the 17th century.

== See also ==
- Duplicarius
