= Schiltron =

Army formation

A schiltron (also spelled sheltron, sceld-trome, schiltrom, or shiltron) is a compact body of troops forming a battle array, shield wall or phalanx. The term is most often associated with Scottish pike formations during the Wars of Scottish Independence in the late 13th and early 14th centuries.

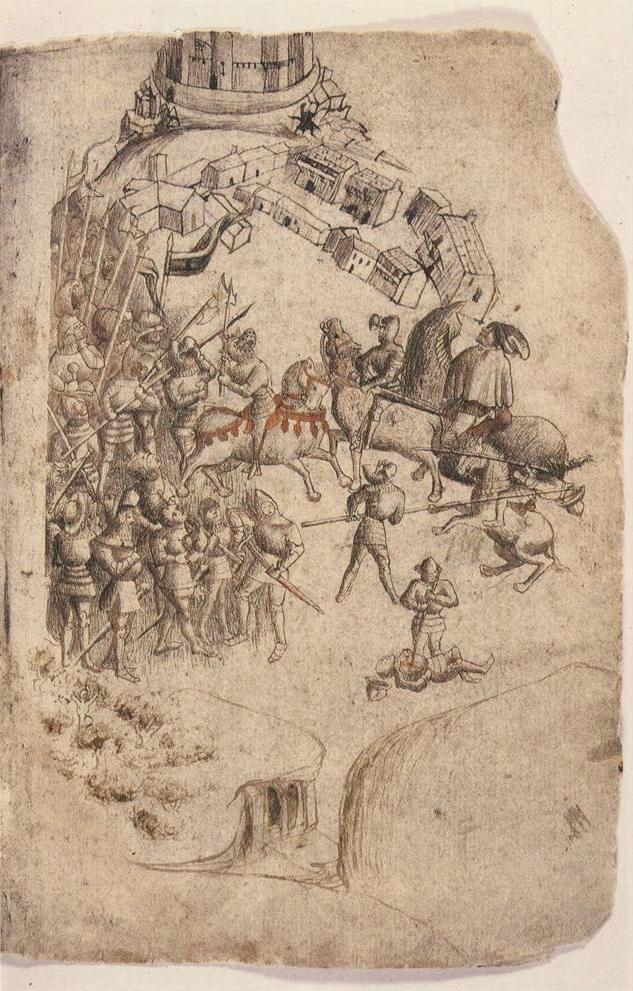
Depiction of the Battle of Bannockburn, with schiltron of pikeman on the left.

== Etymology ==
The term dates from at least 1000 AD and derives from Old English roots expressing the idea of a "shield-troop". Some researchers have also posited this etymological relation may show the schiltron is directly descended from the Anglo-Saxon shield wall, and still others give evidence "schiltron" is a name derived from a Viking circular formation (generally no fewer than a thousand fighters) in extremely close formation, intended to present an enemy's cavalry charge with an "infinite" obstacle (that is, a perimeter horses refuse to breach). Matters are confused by use of this term in Middle English to clearly refer to a body of soldiers without reference to formation, including cavalry and archers. The first mention of the schiltron as a specific formation of spearmen appears to be at the Battle of Falkirk in 1298. There is, however, no reason to believe this is the first time such a formation was used and it may have had a long previous history in Scotland, as the Picts used to employ spears in block formation as the backbone of their armies.

== Examples of the formation ==
=== Circular schiltrons ===
There are two recorded Scottish instances of circular schiltrons: William Wallace's army at the 1298 Battle of Falkirk, and an element of Thomas Randolph's forces on the first day of the 1314 Battle of Bannockburn.

The circular formation is essentially static. At Falkirk, the formation was fortified by driving stakes into the ground before the men, with ropes between. Charles Oman describes the formation thus: "The front ranks knelt with their spear butts fixed in the earth; the rear ranks leveled their lances over their comrades heads; the thick-set grove of twelve foot spears was far too dense for the cavalry to penetrate."

=== Rectilinear schiltrons ===
There are numerous accounts of rectilinear schiltrons – they were employed at the battles of Glen Trool (1307), Bannockburn (the main battle), Myton (1319), Dupplin Muir (1332), Culblean (1335), Halidon Hill (1333), Neville's Cross (1346) and Otterburn (1388).

Unlike the circular schiltron, the rectilinear formation was capable of both defensive and offensive action. The offensive use of the schiltron is a tactical development credited to Robert the Bruce at Bannockburn. He had drilled his troops in the offensive use of the pike (requiring great discipline) and he was able to fight the English forces on flat, firm ground suitable for their large force of cavalry. Bruce's new tactic was a response to a crushing defeat for the Scots at Falkirk when the first recorded use of the schiltron by a Scottish army failed in the face of a combination of conscripted Welsh longbowmen, English archers and English cavalry.

Detailed descriptions of the formation are rare but those given by English chroniclers of Bannockburn demonstrate the essential features:

- "They had axes at their sides and lances in their hands. They advanced like a thick-set hedge and such a phalanx could not easily be broken."
- "They were all on foot; picked men they were, enthusiastic, armed with keen axes, and other weapons, and with their shields closely locked in front of them, they formed an impenetrable phalanx ..."

=== English examples ===
The term schiltron is also used by Barbour to describe English infantry at Bannockburn. It is also used by the author of the Lanercost Chronicle to describe the English spearmen at the Battle of Boroughbridge (1322). In both cases, a rectilinear formation is being described, though that at Boroughbridge is curved, with its flanks bent back.

== European parallels ==
While doubtless a Scottish development, the schiltron fits into a Northern European context of infantry combat. Parallels with Scandinavian practice have already been drawn (see Etymology above) and the multiple-ranked tightly packed infantry formations were standard across Europe during the Middle Ages.

Schiltron-like formations were also used by the Welsh troops at the battles of Orewin Bridge (1282) and Maes Moydog (1295), although this tactic was generally unsuccessful for the Welsh.

Perhaps the closest parallel is with the armies of medieval Flanders. Here too can be seen the deep blocks of fighting men, with rows of spears braced in the earth to resist cavalry. The greatest of their battles was possibly Courtrai in 1302, where the Flemings destroyed a French army of knights and foot-soldiers. The Flemings also made great use of a circular "crown-shaped" formation, similar to those used at Falkirk and Bannockburn.

A similar square formation ("formação em quadrado") of pike-armed foot soldiers was used by the English-assisted Portuguese troops against Castilian armies in the late 14th century at Aljubarrota (1385).

Another example is during the Battle of Legnano (1176) between the Milanese Army against Frederick Barbarossa, in defense of the Carroccio by the Milanese armies commanded by Guido da Landriano.

== See also ==
- History of infantry
- Infantry in the Middle Ages
- Infantry square
- Warfare in Medieval Scotland

=== Comparable formations ===
- Phalanx
- Pike Square
- Shield Wall
- Tercio
- Testudo
