= History of infantry =

History of military personnel who engage in combat on foot

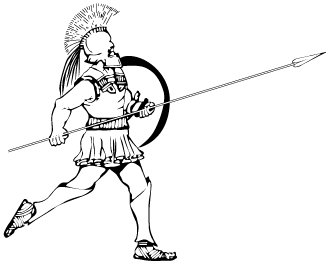
An ancient Greek hoplite of the heavy infantry class

Although the term infantry dates from the 15th century, the foot troops of the previous eras in history who fought with a variety of weapons before the introduction of the firearms are also referred to as infantry. During the Ancient and Middle Ages infantry were often categorized by the types of weapons and armour they used, such as heavy infantry and light infantry. Generally, light infantry acted as skirmishers, scouts, and as a screening force for the more heavily armed and armored heavy infantry, the latter of which often made up the bulk of many historic armies.

With the introduction of firearms, line infantry would come to dominate the makeup of most armies, their name reflective of both their formations and fighting style. During this time period, light infantry often served as elite marksmen while retaining their scouting, skirmishing, and screening roles. This era would also see the founding of many naval infantry or marine units.

With the introduction of advanced modes of transportation such as motor vehicles, armored fighting vehicles, and aircraft, new tactics and infantry designations were developed, such as motorized, mechanized, and airborne infantry. Specialized units, such as mountain infantry were also created. Light infantry, in the modern sense, has come to represent generalist professional infantry units whom, despite their non-specialized nature, often play an important role in combined arms warfare.

The word infantry was borrowed into other Romance languages from the Latin infantem, a "foot soldier" who served in groups composed of those soldiers who were too-inexperienced or too low in rank for membership to the cavalry. As a meaning for an organised type of combat troops, the word dates to 1579 in the French infantrie and Spanish infanteria. However, in military history it has become a common English term to apply to troops from earlier historical periods.

With the notable exception of the Mongol Empire, infantry has represented the largest component in most armies of the past, as well as the present. While the specific weapons have varied, the common factor is that these soldiers have relied on their feet for tactical movements, but since the introduction of the rail and motor transport have been operationally transported behind the front-lines, and have made use of strategic airlift with the introduction of aircraft into warfare.

During Ancient history, infantry was essentially an armed mob, fighting in loosely organized opposing lines, under the vocal direction of individual commanders in the immediate vicinity of the troops' hearing range. However, the benefits of uniform, equipment, weaponry and, above all, training led to the development of formations able to carry out pre-arranged tactical maneuvers in the heat of battle.

Since that time, infantry organization has focused on finding a balance between heavily armed formations that emphasise firepower and ability to withstand direct assaults, and more lightly armed but also more mobile units able to manoeuvre around the battlefield faster, to exploit tactical opportunities. Mobility, armament, and protection have been the three competing primary factors that complement and compete in the balanced approach to development of infantry doctrine throughout history.

== Classical period ==
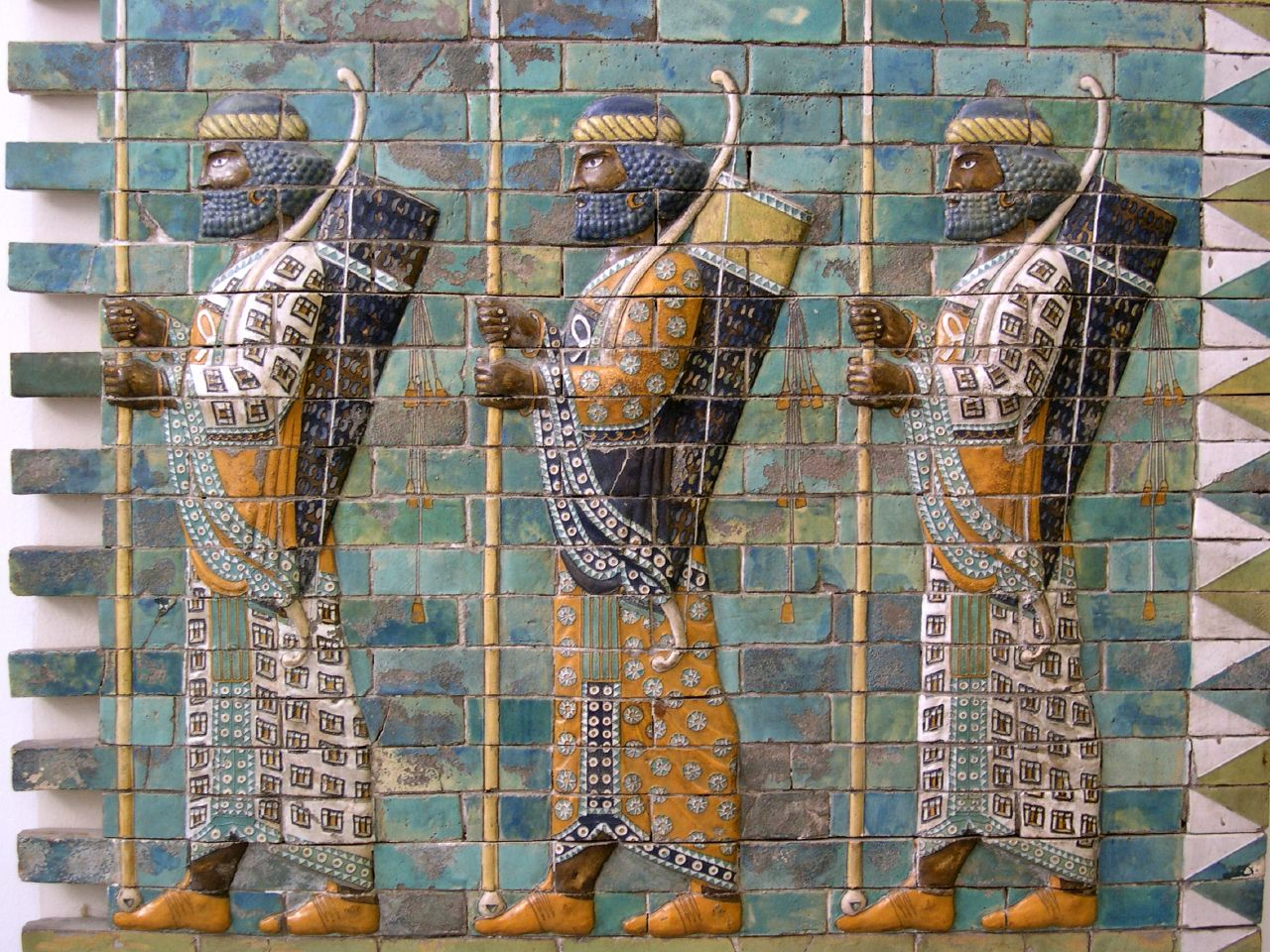
Persian Immortals, detail from the archers' frieze in Darius' palace in Susa. 510 BC.

Infantry was the primary combat arm of the Classical period. Examples of infantry units of the period are the Immortals of the Persian Empire, the hoplites of ancient Greece and the legions of Imperial Rome and Auxiliaries (Roman military) troops. In contrast to the strictly organized immortals, phalanxes and legions, most armies of the ancient world also employed units of irregulars (often mercenaries) who wore less armor and fought in more open formations usually as skirmishers.

As the Decline of the Roman Empire occurred, the huge swathe of lands under their sway became the territory of Germanic tribes, such as the Vandals, Goths, and Visigoths in the 5th century. The political and military resources necessary for the maintenance of such rigid-formation units largely disappeared until the later Middle Ages.

== Middle Ages ==
For most of the Middle Ages, warfare and society were dominated by the cavalry (horse-mounted soldiers), composed of individual knights. Knights were generally drawn from the aristocracy, while the infantry levies were raised from commoners. This situation slowed the advance of infantry tactics and weapon technologies; those that were developed by the end of the Middle Ages included the use of pikes or halberds to counter the long reach of knights' lances, and the increased use of ranged weaponry to counter the cavalry's advantages of momentum, speed, height, and reach. However, from 1350 onwards the knights themselves usually dismounted for battle, becoming super-heavy infantry themselves, as a countermeasure to development of massed archery tactics which would bring their horses down. This led to development of combined arms tactics of archery and dismounted knights.

== Early modern period ==
While bows remained in use long after the development of firearms, technological fine-tuning along with the development of the matchlock allowed firearms to supersede even the feared Welsh and English Longbow as the ranged weapon of choice for infantry during the late renaissance and early modern period. The bow also declined in favor because of the ease with which musketeers could be trained (days or weeks to attain moderate proficiency, as opposed to many years for the longbow).

Between the rising popularity of gunpowder weapons, particularly the lighter arquebus and heavier musket, and the stunning success of the Swiss Reisläufer and the German Landsknechte, these two weapons came to dominate renaissance warfare, at least in western and central Europe. During the Burgundian Wars, and later the Italian Wars, Swiss pikemen had great success, on the defensive against heavy cavalry and on the offensive against traditional Medieval Infantry. But at the Battle of Cerignola, an entrenched Spanish force of 8,000, including 1,000 Arquebusiers, was able to defeat a French army of 32,000, mainly Swiss Pike and Gendarmes, but with a 2:1 superiority in artillery as well. This battle proved how effective hand-held gunpowder weapons could be, and their popularity increased steadily until they had replaced melee weapons entirely.

At Cerignola, the Spanish had deployed in mixed formations of Pike and Shot, called "Coronels". These would eventually evolve into the Tercio, a mixed formation of Pike and Shot, and also, initially Sword – though over time the ratio of shot to pike increased steadily, and the Swordsmen were phased out entirely. After the Spanish Tercios, many other nations combined firearms with extremely long pikes into units that were virtually invincible against cavalry formations.

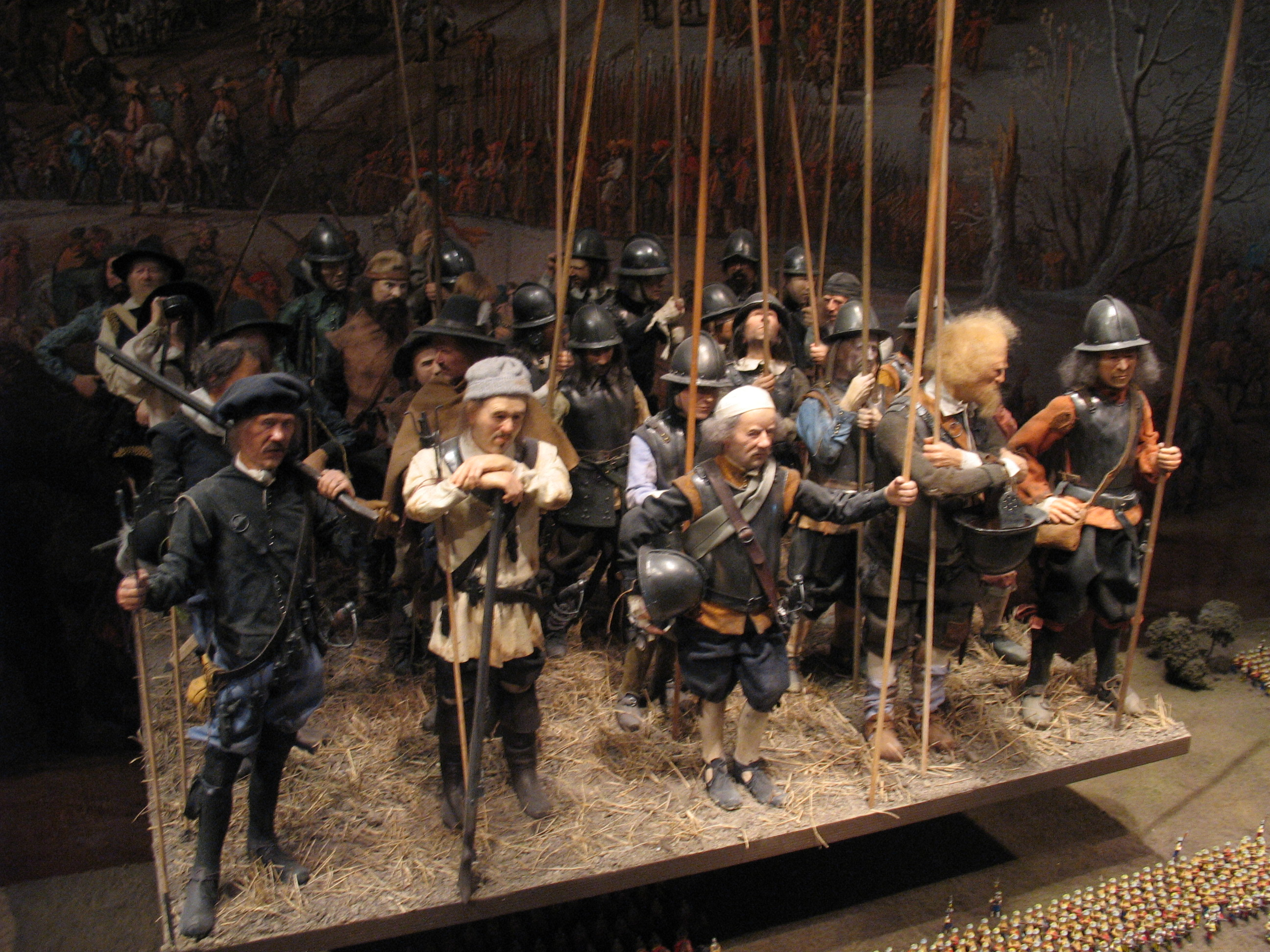
A model of a section of a pike and shot formation from the Thirty Years' War on display at the Army Museum in Stockholm. Consistent (uniform) dress was not common for military troops at the time.

In the late 16th and early 17th centuries, the Dutch Stadholder Maurice of Nassau initiated a series of reforms to reduce the size of the unwieldy Tercio, and increase its firepower by reducing the number of ranks, thinning the formation. The much smaller Dutch Regiments consisted of two battalions of 550 men each, which could form up together or fight separately on the battlefield. Each was composed of a number of companies, which were administrative, not tactical, units. This method of infantry organization, using the same terms and almost the same numbers, became nigh-universal in militaries of the 18th century.

As firearms became more effective during the 17th century, the ratio of musket to pike was increased from a common standard of about 1:1 around the start of the 17th century to about 2:1 in the middle of the century, and 4:1 or even 6:1 by the end of the 17th century. Another trend was the thinning of infantry formations. The Spanish Tercio was around 25 ranks deep when at full strength. The Dutch Battalion was 10 ranks deep, and the Swedish Brigade was reduced to six or sometimes even four ranks deep. The Swedish reforms under Gustavus Adolphus were instrumental in displaying to all of Europe the potential of firepower, and the effectiveness of maximising it by thinning ranks. By the 18th century, the standard infantry line would be three ranks deep, and this trend would continue until World War I, reducing to two ranks in the Napoleonic Era, then to skirmish lines by the end of the American Civil War.

Eventually, with the development of the bayonet, the pikemen were dropped from the formation, resulting in the first examples of an infantry unit as recognizable today – though the pike was still used occasionally throughout the 18th century, particularly in the Great Northern War and Eastern Europe in general.

By the beginning of the 18th century, line infantry appeared and quickly became the main and most common type of infantry in the European countries. Line infantry was armed with smooth-bore muskets with bayonets.

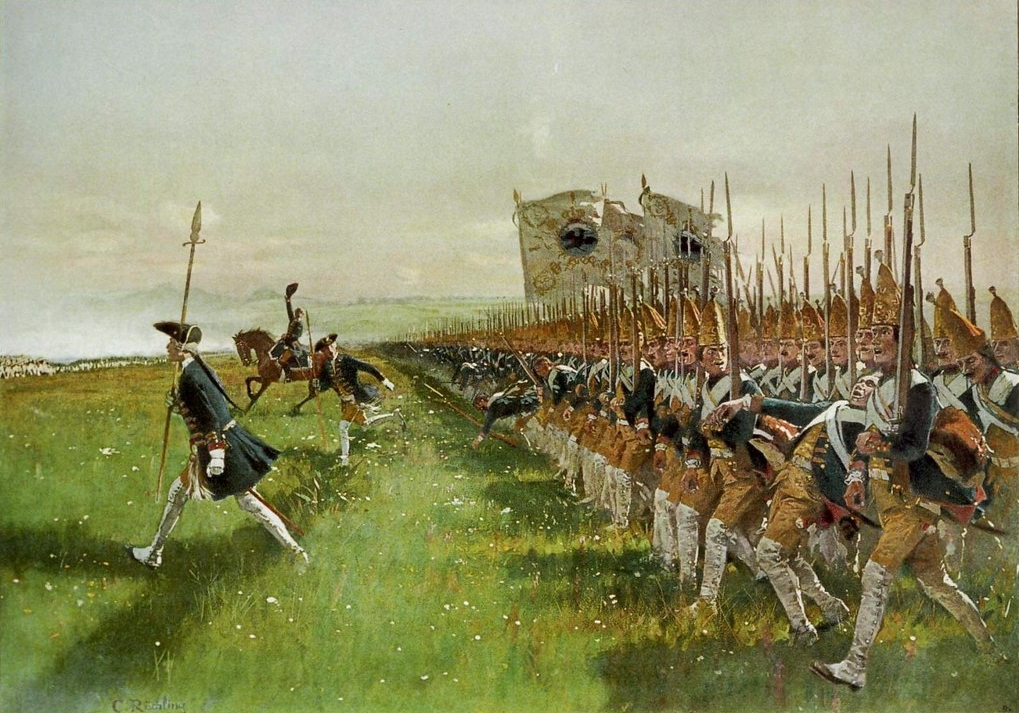
Prussian line infantry attack at the 1745 Battle of Hohenfriedberg.

In the 18th century light infantry appeared. A skirmish force screening the main body of infantry became so important to any army in the field that eventually all the major European powers developed specialised skirmishing light infantry. Light infantry, such as German Jägers or Austro-Hungarian Pandours, was armed with primitive rifles. As these rifles took a long time to load (up to one minute as opposed to three to five shots a minute for muskets), light infantry played an auxiliary role.

== Modern era ==
Before the development of railroads in the 19th century, infantry armies got to the battlefield by walking, or sometimes by ship. The Republic of Venice set up the "Fanti da mar", the first corps of troops specifically trained for fighting from ships, in the 15th century or possibly even before; the oldest still-existing Marine corps in the world was established in the 16th century by the Spanish (Infanteria de Marina), followed in the 17th century by other European countries including the United Kingdom. Because of Britain's island status, a large army was unnecessary; however, infantry soldiers were still required for eventual landings. A typical Royal Navy warship carried 600 men, of which 120–180 would have been Royal Marines. These men usually had a deck to themselves and had little to do with sailing the vessel; Their non-combat roles typically included training and drill, along with assisting ship’s officers in maintaining good order and discipline among the crew. The men were proficient in the use of metal-working, gunpowder and modern weapons of the day and would form landing parties when exploring. The Marines also defended the vessel if boarded and would repair damaged weapons and cannons after a battle.

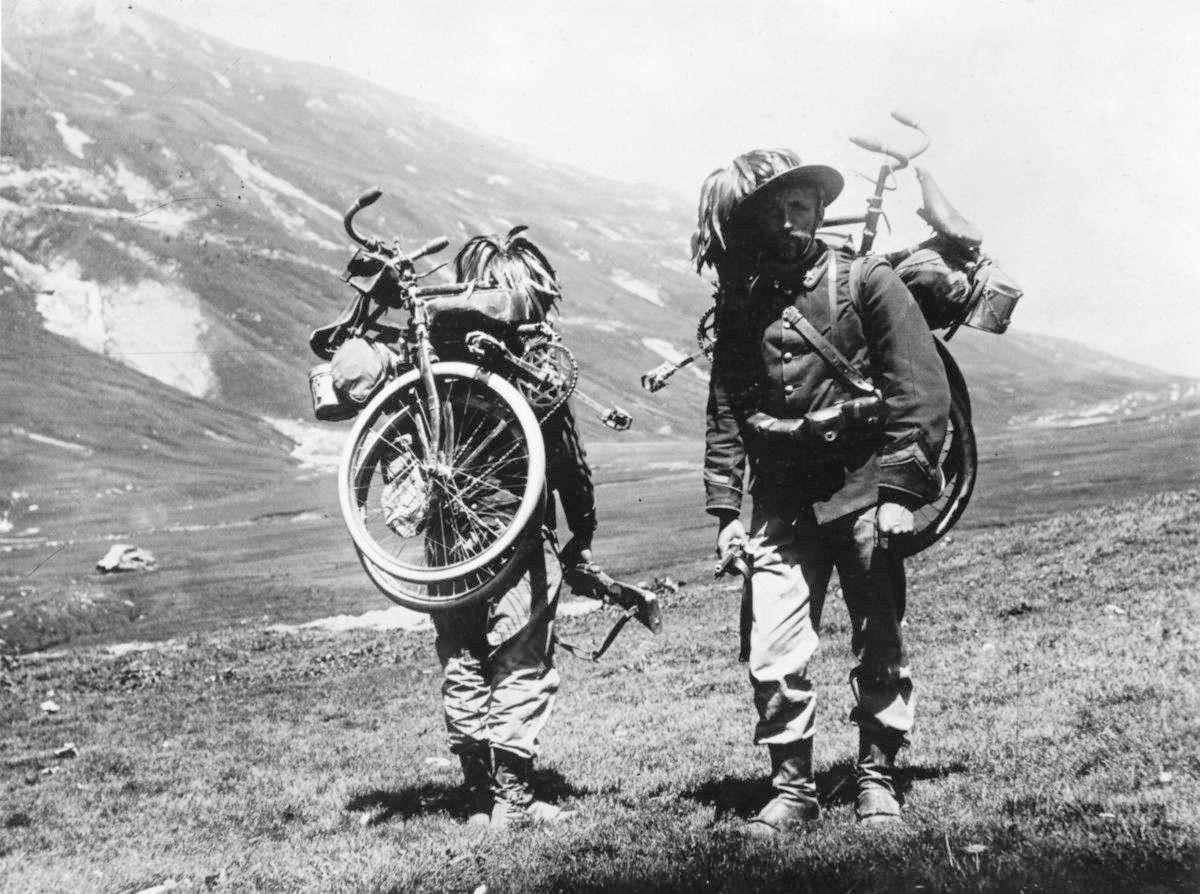
Photo showing Bersaglieri with Bicycles strapped to their backs. Image before 1911.

In the mid-19th century – up to and through the American Civil War – the United States made extensive use of infantry both in battle, as well as part of opening the western frontier to settlement. The Buffalo Soldiers were an example of the use of both infantry and cavalry during the period immediately following that war and well beyond. In the 1890s and later, some countries, such as Italy with their Bersaglieri, used bicycle infantry, but the real revolution in mobility started in the 1920s with the use of motor vehicles, resulting in motorized infantry.

During the 19th century, advances in firearms technology rendered the use of close formations obsolete. Widespread use of rifled guns (including cannons), and the advent of reliable breech-loading weapons and automated weapons like the Gatling gun, altered the tactical landscape. These weapons fired at greater range with accuracy, and technological improvements in aiming them also simplified the targeting of large bodies of enemy forces. By the late 19th century, the concept of fighting in formation was on the wane, and the distinctions between skirmishers and heavy infantry has now disappeared. During World War I due to the increasing lethality of more modern weapons, such as artillery and machine guns, infantry tactics shifted to trench warfare.

Action in World War II demonstrated the importance of protecting the soldiers while they are moving around, resulting in the development of mechanized infantry, who use armored vehicles for transport. World War II also saw the first widespread use of paratroopers. These were soldiers that parachuted from airplanes into combat, and they played key roles in several campaigns in the European theater.

=== After 1945 ===
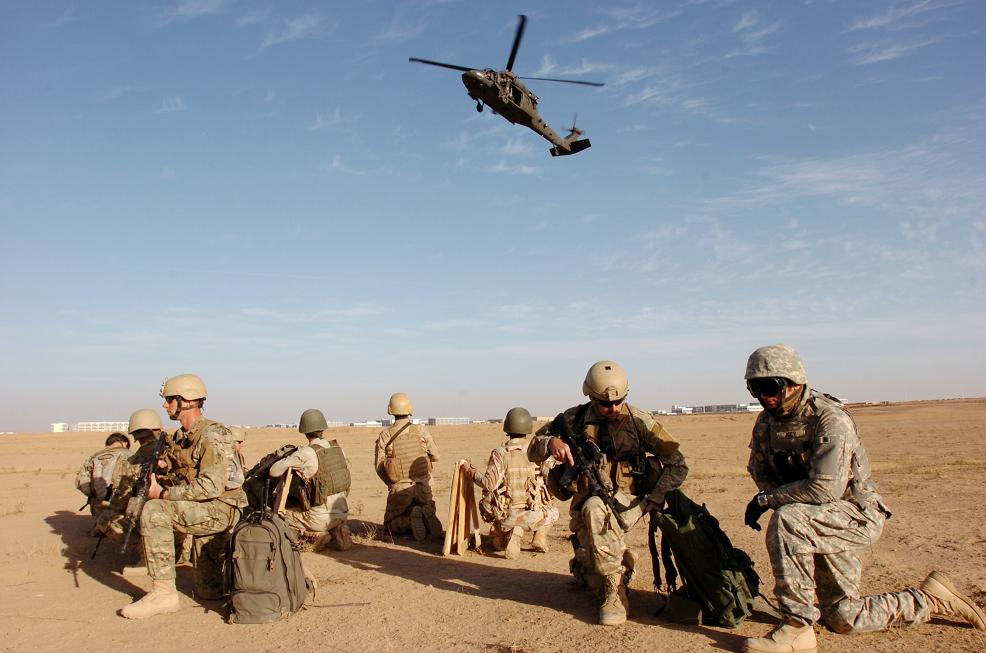
United States and Iraqi Army infantry during the Iraq War.

In the Vietnam War, infantry has often depended on technology other than its own feet for delivery into battle. One such example is the United States Army's pioneering use of helicopters to deliver infantry quickly between key locations on the battlefield. Formations such as those now form a part of many armed forces and are referred to as airmobile infantry, and delivering infantry into battle on helicopters is known as an air assault.

Most other present day infantry is either motorized or mechanised, supported by armored fighting vehicles, artillery, and aircraft, but along with light infantry, which does not use armored fighting vehicles, is still the only kind of military force that can take and hold some terrain types (such as urban or other close terrain), and thus remains essential to fighting wars.

The purpose of infantry uniform has also completed its transition from a simple means of identifying allies and rank (as it was throughout much of the modern era) to practical combat gear with a focus on camouflage and protection.

== See also ==
- Infantry tactics
