= Infantry in the Middle Ages =

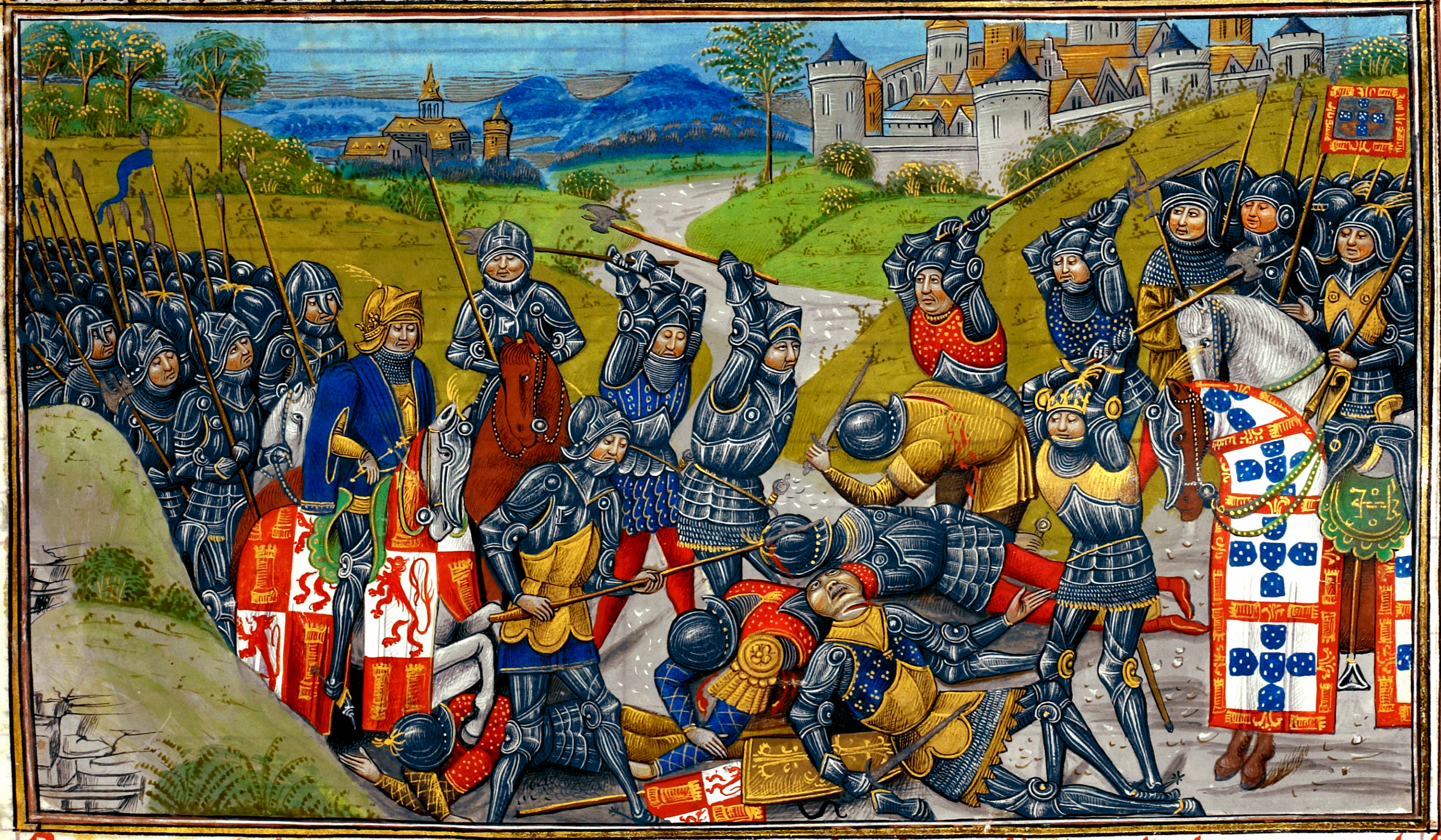
Infantrymen at the Battle of Aljubarrota, 1385

Despite the rise of knightly cavalry in the 11th century, infantry played an important role throughout the Middle Ages on both the battlefield and in sieges. From the 14th century onwards, it has been argued that there was a rise in the prominence of infantry forces, sometimes referred to as an "infantry revolution", but this view is strongly contested by some military historians.

== Cost, recruitment, and growth ==
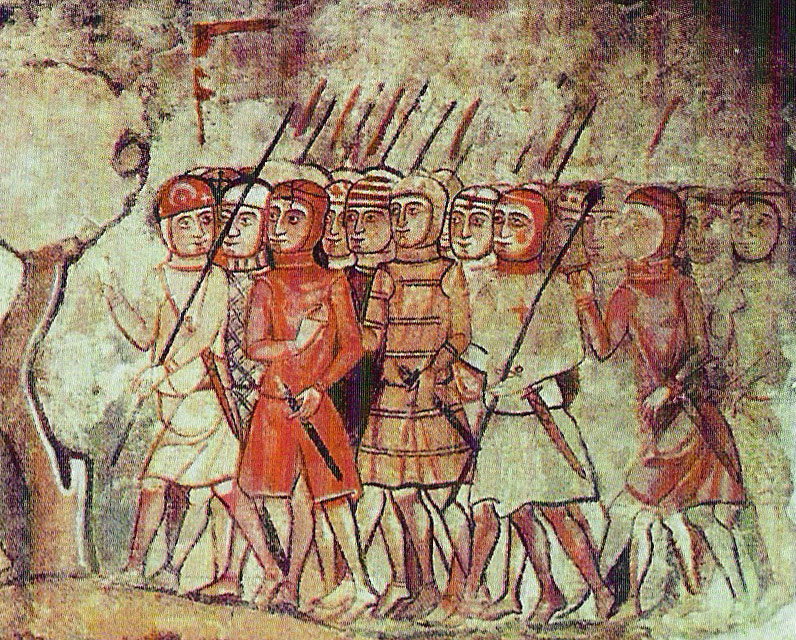
Catalan infantry of the 13th. century

=== Rising costs of war ===
In the medieval period, the mounted warrior held sway for an extended time. Typically heavily armoured, well-motivated and mounted on powerful, specially bred horses, the mounted knight represented a formidable force, which was used to effect against more lightly armoured troops. Since only the noble classes could afford the expense of knightly warfare, the supremacy of the mounted cavalryman was associated with the hierarchical structure of medieval times, particularly feudalism. As the period progressed, however, the dominance of the cavalry elite began to slowly break down. The Black Death in the 14th century swept through Europe, devastating the population and resulting in serious manpower shortages. This encouraged more economical use of available manpower, and the infantryman was much cheaper to outfit and maintain than the aristocratic knight. The Crusade era highlighted the importance of infantry and required large numbers of men and material to be organized for distant battlefields, but foot was consistently a central element in medieval armies. Such expeditions were part of the growing number of sieges, disputes and campaigns throughout the 13th and 14th centuries that greatly increased the cost of warfare for medieval regimes. The relative inexpensiveness of the infantryman, combined with a shortage of manpower, provided incentives for expanding their use.

=== Recruitment ===
By the 11th century, much of the infantry fighting was conducted by high-ranking nobles, middle-class freemen and peasants, who were expected to have a certain standard of equipment, often including helmet, spear, shield and secondary weapons in the form of an axe, long knife or sword. Peasants were also used for the role of archers and skirmishers, providing missile cover for the heavy infantry and cavalry. The High Medieval period also saw the expansion of mercenary forces, unbound to any medieval lord. Routiers, such as Brabançons and Aragones, were supplemented in the later Middle Ages by Swiss pikeman, the German Landsknecht, and the Italian Condottiere - to provide the three best-known examples of these bands of fighting men. It has been argued that the expanded campaigns, castle-building and sieges of the era also saw greater use of household troops, often bodyguards of the elite, with a variety of useful skills. These were cheaper to recruit and maintain than knights with all their trappings, such as the renowned crossbowmen in Richard I's crusading mesnée in the late 12th century. Siege warfare, in particular, required large bodies of troops in the field, for extended periods, including numerous specialists. All this added up to make the early days of peasant levies unsustainable. As more kings and lords turned to infantry, their opponents had to keep pace, leading to additional increases in foot troops. To obtain the best fighting men, elites had to make provision for their regular payment and supply. As Clifford Rogers, historian of medieval warfare notes:

The rising importance of foot troops, thus, brought not only the opportunity but also the need to expand armies substantially. Thus as early as the late 13th century, we can observe Edward I campaigning at the head of armies incorporating tens of thousands of paid archers and spearmen. This represented a major change in approaches to recruitment, organization, and above all pay.

== Organisation and deployment ==
=== Organisation ===
The importance of good order was well understood in medieval warfare:

Two great evils [...] can follow from a disordered formation: one is that enemies can easily break into it; the other is that the formations may be so compressed that they cannot fight. Thus it is important to keep the formation in ranks and tight and joined together like a wall

— Christine de Pizan

Militia forces were often organised by guilds or districts, with their officers and banners. Swiss muster rolls show officers and standard bearers being appointed, and men being assigned to particular positions in the formation. Various accounts show that it was the role of commanders to make sure their men knew their position in the formation, knew which banners they fought under and who stood around them.

=== Formations ===
Philippe Contamine identifies three basic infantry formations in the Middle Ages; the wall, the circle or crescent and the deep solid formation, either rectangular or triangular.

==== Shieldwall ====
Linear formations existed throughout the medieval period. In the early Middle Ages, infantry used the Shieldwall, a formation where shields were held edge-to-edge or overlapped, but lines persisted beyond the widespread abandonment of shields in the later Middle Ages. Lines could vary in depth from four to sixteen deep and were drawn up tightly packed.

==== All round defence ====
This formation, called the crown by J. F. Verbruggen, was used by infantry to form an all round defence against cavalry. It is recorded as having been used by Flemings, Swiss, Scots and Scandinavians.

==== Deep formations ====
Deep columns were favoured by the Swiss. A reconstruction of the deployment of Zürich forces in 1443 gives a formation 56 men wide by 20 deep, the formation having a width of 168 ft (51 m) and a depth of 140 ft (43 m). The Swiss main formation at the Battle of Morat consisted of 10,000 men, the outer four ranks being made up of pikemen, the inner ranks of halberdiers, the force having an estimated area of 60 by 60 metres (200 ft × 200 ft).

Triangular formations were also used, this sometimes being described as "in the manner of a shield" (Latin: in modum scuti). Wedge formations were used by the Vikings under the name of a "swine wedge" (Old Norse: svinfylking). The Swiss also sometimes used a keil or wedge of pikes to lead their columns.

== Against other types of combatants ==
=== Against cavalry ===
Tactically there were only two ways for infantry to beat cavalry in an open field battle: firepower and mass. Firepower could be provided by swarms of missiles. Mass could be provided by a tightly packed phalanx of men. Such tactics were long-established; the Romans used missile troops such as slingers, and the core infantry learned to deal with swarming enemy cavalrymen by forming a hollow square fenced with a solid hedge of iron pila (large javelins). Alexander the Great combined both methods in his clashes with the Asiatic horseman of Persia and India, screening his central infantry phalanx with slingers, archers and javelin-men, before unleashing his cavalry against the enemy. Both mass and firepower could be aided by a good tactical position, such as on a hill or on rough terrain, where enemy cavalry would have trouble manoeuvring. These ancient lessons were relearned in the medieval period: in the Crusades, in the continued operations of forces like the Flemish footman, and particularly the Swiss pikeman and the English longbowman.

The Crusades offer an illustration of the growing recognition of the need for infantry. Against the mounted Islamic foes of European armies, infantry forces were of vital importance. Archers, for example, were essential in holding the fast-moving Muslim cavalry at bay—suppressing their firepower, and allowing the armoured knights to mount successful counter-attacks. Pikemen were important in screening the flanks of the Christian forces, always vulnerable to assault by the Turkish horsemen. Against Saladin's light cavalry at Jaffa (c. 1192) during the Crusades, Richard of England drew up a line of spearmen, kneeling on the ground with spear planted in front, forming an effectual 'hedge of steel' against the charging enemy horsemen. Behind the spear wall, crossbowmen stood ready, with assistants helping to reload. The Muslim armies attacked but the combined firepower of the archers and the steadiness of the wall of spears held. Once the Muslims pulled back, Richard ordered his armoured knights forward, and Saladin withdrew. At the battle of Courtrai in 1302, the determined Flemish infantry staked out a good position on advantageous ground (cut up with streams and ditches) and stood firm against the cavalry charge of the French nobles using their pikes and wooden Goedendag, a combination spear and club. The French charge was stopped and the Flemish infantry then moved forward to liquidate the opposition. At Bannockburn, the Scottish fighters dug numerous pits to foil the English cavalry, blunted the English advance, then counter-attacked with their pike army to soundly defeat their opponents. These and other examples illustrate the importance of trained infantry, but the dominance of the footman did not come overnight. Both cavalryman and infantryman continued to operate for long periods side by side throughout the medieval period.

=== Against other infantry ===
The essential elements of success in infantry combat were seen as good order and a tight formation, not impetus. During the Hundred Years' War, it was considered disadvantageous for infantry to be forced to attack. If infantry were forced to advance to the attack, it should be at a slow, steady pace and without turning. The actual mechanics of impact are not, however, fully understood. In his reconstruction of the infantry fight at Agincourt, John Keegan describes the French as running to contact over the final yards but the English stepping back to "wrong foot" them. The English gave back a "spear's length", leaving the two bodies spear fencing at a distance of 10–15 ft. This idea of a space between the battlelines in which combat takes place also features in some reconstructions of shield wall combat. Others see the clash of shield walls as involving the physical impact of one line with the other.

While it was known for a poorly arrayed line to disintegrate on contact with the enemy, it was more usual for a static battle to ensue and last for some time. Combat was not constant, the two sides parting to rest and reorganise. This could happen several times during combat. When it wasn't possible, an infantry force could become compressed and disordered with disastrous consequences, as happened at Agincourt and Westrozebeke.

=== Role of archery ===
The traditional role of archery on the medieval battlefield was to begin the action, advancing in front of the main body of the army, as occurred at the Battle of Hastings. This continued to be a standard tactic, particularly in the absence of enemy cavalry. The Swiss crossbowmen and handgunners of the 15th century were notable for their aggressive skirmishing in advance of the main army, as at Morat. To protect archers, particularly crossbowmen, against enemy archers, they were often deployed behind men with large shields, called pavises. This technique is first noted during the Crusades in the 12th century, for example at Jaffa, but was particularly common in Italy in the later Middle Ages. The crossbow began to replace the standard bow throughout Europe in the 12th century. In England and Wales, the longbow and in the Iberian Peninsula (Portugal and Spain) the recurved bow continued in use to the end of the period. Christian Spain owed the use of composite bows and mounted archery using Parthian shots to its long exposure to Islamic military techniques during the Reconquista.

Later in the Middle Ages, massed archery techniques were developed. English and Welsh longbowmen in particular were famed for the volume and accuracy of their shooting, to which cavalry and poorly armoured infantry were particularly vulnerable.

=== In siege ===
A large number of sieges during the medieval era called for huge numbers of infantry in the field, both in defence and in the attack. Aside from labour units to construct defensive or offensive works, several specialists were deployed such as artillerymen, engineers and miners. Strongly fortified castles were hard to overcome. The simplest, most effective method was blockade and starvation. Artillery in the form of catapult, siege engines and later gunpowder weapons played an important role in reducing fortified positions. Mining beneath walls, shoring up the tunnel then collapsing it was also used. Defenders employed counter-tactics- using their artillery, missile weapons, and countermines against attacking forces. Against sieges, cavalrymen were not as valuable as footmen, and a large number of such troops was also used in the construction of fortifications. Free mercenary forces such as the Condottiere generally attempted to defeat their foes in open field battle or manoeuvre, but also participated in sieges, adding to the specialist ranks that bolstered the growing dominance of infantry.

== Notable infantry of the Middle Ages ==
=== Swiss pikemen ===
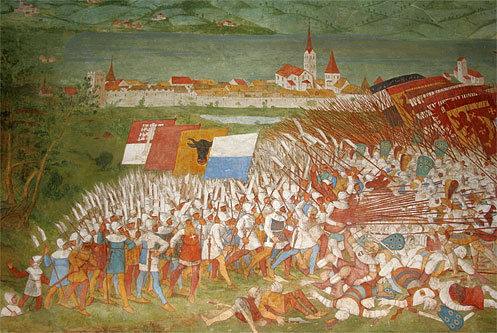
Pikemen at the Battle of Sempach, 1386

The use of long pikes and densely packed foot troops was not uncommon during the Middle Ages. The Flemish footmen at the Battle of Courtrai, for example, as shown above, met and overcame the French knights c. 1302, and the Scots occasionally used the technique against the English during the Wars of Scottish Independence. However, it was the Swiss that brought infantry and pike tactics to an extremely high standard.

==== Morale, mobility and motivation ====
Rather than reluctant peasant levies dragooned into service by the local lords, the Swiss often fought as volunteer mercenaries for pay throughout Europe. Historical records indicate that the hard-marching Swiss pikemen managed to keep pace with cavalry units at times, if only in the confined terrain of the Alpine regions. Such mobility is outstanding but not unknown among foot soldiers. Roman records mention Germanic infantrymen trotting with cavalry, sometimes resting their hands on the horses for support. Centuries later, the fast-moving Zulu impis in Southern Africa made their mark, reputedly achieving an outstanding march rate of 50 miles per day. Using their mobility, the Swiss were frequently able to overcome contemporary mounted or infantry forces. Swiss pikemen were also generally known as highly motivated, tough-minded soldiers, with little respect for knightly trappings. In several historical accounts, the Swiss refused to retreat and stood and fought to the last man, even when greatly outnumbered, or facing a hopeless outcome.

==== Weapons and equipment ====
The Swiss initially started with mid-length polearms such as the halberds and the lucerne hammer, but eventually adopted the pike to fight more effectively in open terrain during the 15th century, after facing difficulties with dismounted gendarmes. These were excellent for dealing with mounted assaults. Rather than simply meet a lance on equal terms, a cavalryman facing the Swiss could expect to deal with sharp points and slashing blows that could certainly not cleave his armour, but could easily break his bones. Some polearms had hooks that could drag an enemy horseman from his mount. Pole weapons were mixed in combat, with pikemen in the front ranks and halberdiers deployed further back to break the deadlock of the "push of pike" after the former had delivered the initial shock treatment. The Swiss wore little armour, unlike the ancient phalanx warriors of old, dispensing with greaves or shield, and donning only a helmet and a relatively light reinforced corselet.

==== Manoeuvre and formations ====
In numerous battles before the rise of the Swiss, it was not uncommon for pikemen to group and await a mounted attack. Such an approach is sensible in certain circumstances, particularly if the phalanx occupies a strong position secured by terrain features. The downside is that it allows the attacking force more initiative. At the Battle of Falkirk, the Scots pikemen managed to hold off their cavalry opponents but were caught in a static position, providing targets for the English longbow. The Swiss, though by no means the creators of pike tactics, improved on them by adding flexible formations and aggressive manoeuvre.

When fighting on their own the Swiss often conducted complicated pre-battle manoeuvres through rough terrain to outflank their opponents, the different pike columns attacking from different directions. This was seen at the battles of Grandson, Morat, Nancy, and Novara. On the other hand, when employed in mercenary service they often showed a surprising stubbornness in clinging to frontal assaults (Bicocca, Cerignola), trusting that their reputation for ferocity and unflinching resolve would overcome any opposition.

A typical pike force was divided into three sections or columns. The Swiss were flexible in their dispositions – each section could operate independently or combine with others for mutual support. They could form a hollow square for all-round defence. They could advance in echelon or a triangular "wedge" assault. They could manoeuvre to mount wing attacks – with one column pinning the foe centrally, while a second echelon struck the flanks. They could group in-depth on a strong natural position like a hill. Even more disconcerting to their opponents, the Swiss attacked and manoeuvred aggressively. They did not await the mounted men, but themselves took the initiative, forcing their opponents to respond to their moves. It was a formula that brought them much battlefield success.

The famous Swiss hollow square provided for a vanguard group of blademen using slashing halberds or two-handed swords to break the front of cavalry formations. Bowmen and crossbowmen sometimes preceded the main body also as to provide missile cover, and similar contingents protected the flanks. The main force of pikemen advanced behind this screen. Battle was bloody and direct, and the Swiss killed any opponent regardless of knightly status. At the battle of Murten in 1477, the Swiss demonstrated that the square was not a static formation but could be used aggressively. Deployment of the vanguard, main body and rearguard were staggered in echelon, massing 10,000 men in a very small area (60 by 60 meters). The opposition was liquidated.

==== Effectiveness of the Swiss ====
The Swiss won a series of spectacular victories throughout Europe, helping to bring down the feudal order over the time, including victories at Morgarten, Laupen, Sempach, and Grandson. In some engagements the Swiss phalanx included crossbowmen, giving the formation a missile stand-off capability. Such was their effectiveness, that between 1450 and 1550 every leading prince in Europe either hired Swiss pikemen or emulated their tactics and weapons (such as the German Landsknecht). Even the Swiss, however, were not invincible; they could be beaten when confronted with a foe with absolute superiority in numbers, weaponry and armour (as almost happened at Arbedo in 1422, and at St Jakob in 1444) and the advent of firearms and field fortifications made the Swiss frontal steamroller attack extremely risky (as shown by the battles of Cerignola and Bicocca).

=== English and Welsh longbowmen ===
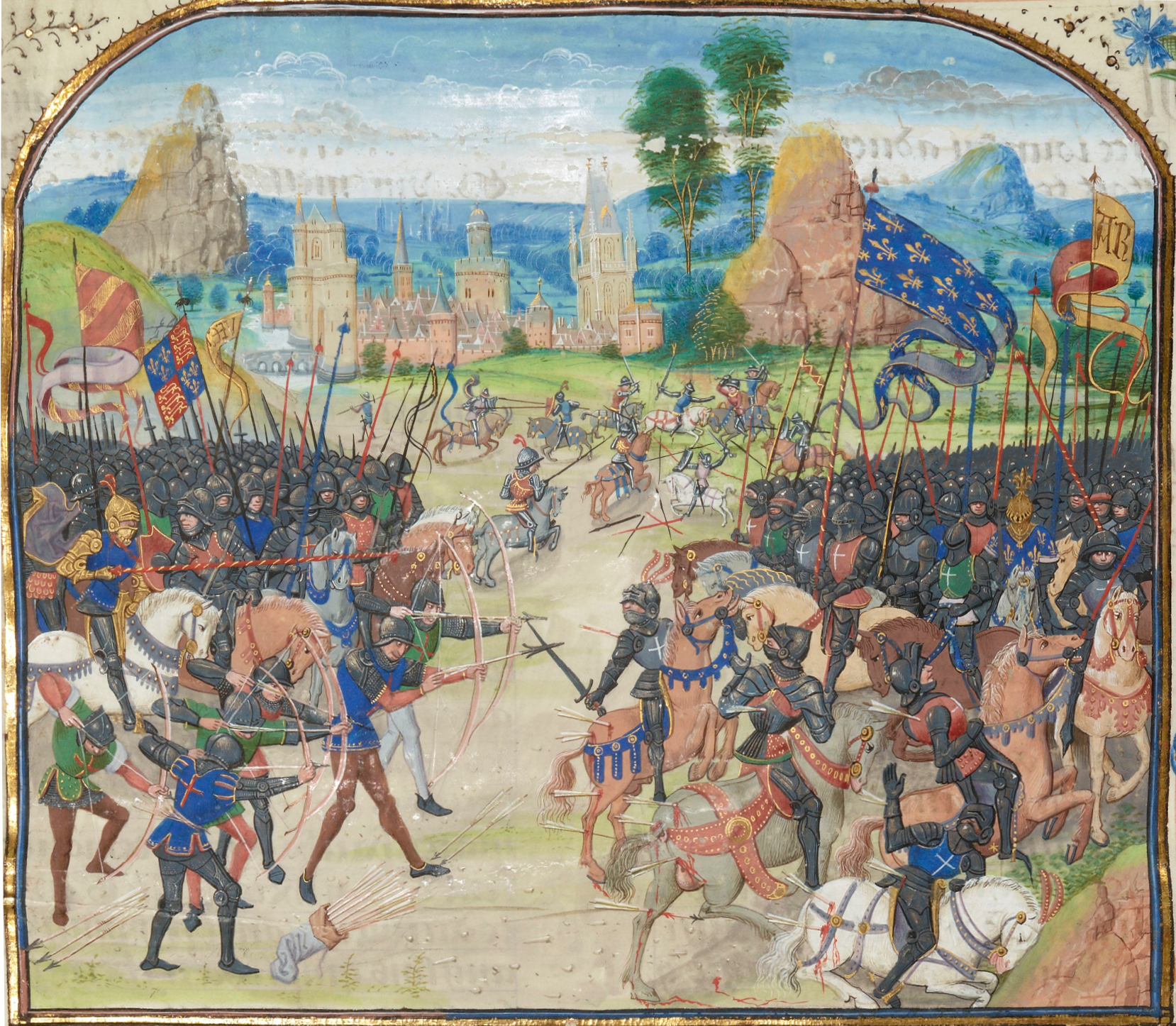
Archers at the Battle of Poitiers, 1356

The English longbowman brought new effectiveness to European battlefields, not hitherto known widely for native archery. Also unusual was the type of bow used. Whereas Asian forces typically relied on the powerful multi-piece, multi-layered composite bow, the English relied on the single-piece longbow which delivered a stinging warhead of respectable range and punch.

==== Longbows and archers ====
In the British Isles, bows have been known from ancient times, but it was among the tribal Welsh that proficiency in use and construction became highly developed. Using their bows, the Welsh forces inflicted a heavy toll on the English invaders of their lands. Adapted by the English, the longbow was nevertheless a difficult weapon to master, requiring long years of use and practice. Even bow construction was extended, sometimes taking as much as four years for seasoned staves to be prepared and shaped for final deployment. A skilled longbowman could shoot 12 arrows a minute, a rate of fire superior to competing weapons like the crossbow or early gunpowder weapons. The nearest competitor to the longbow was the much more expensive crossbow or Arbalest, used often by urban militias and mercenary forces. It required less training but lacked the range of the longbow. A cheap "low class" weapon, considered "unchivalrous" by those unlucky enough to face it, the longbow outperformed the crossbow in the hands of skilled archers, and was to transform several battlefields in Europe.

==== On the battlefield ====
Longbowmen were used to great effect on the continent of Europe, as assorted kings and leaders clashed with their enemies on the battlefields of France. The most famous of these battles were Crecy, Poitiers and Agincourt. The English tactical system relied on a combination of longbowmen and heavy infantry, such as dismounted men-at-arms. Difficult to deploy in a thrusting mobile offensive, the longbow was best used in a defensive configuration. Against mounted enemies, the bowmen took up a defensive position and unleashed clouds of arrows into the ranks of knights and men-at-arms. The ranks of the bowmen were extended in thin lines and protected and screened by pits (e.g. Crecy), stakes (e.g. Agincourt) or trenches (e.g. Morlaix). There is some academic controversy about how the longbowmen and heavy infantry related on the battlefield. According to the traditional view articulated by A.H. Burne, the bowmen were deployed in a "V" between divisions of infantry, enabling them to trap and enfilade their foes. Other, more recent, historians such as Matthew Bennett dispute this, holding that the archers were normally deployed on the flanks of the army as a whole, rather than between divisions.

=== Widespread use of crossbows ===
While the famous English longbowman is better known in the popular imagination, the missile troops that caused the most damage in the medieval era were the crossbowmen. The Catholic Church tried to outlaw the crossbow and all other ranged weapons at the Second Lateran Council in 1139, without much success. The crossbow was constructed initially of wood with steel gradually taking over in the 15th century, producing a weapon which had a range of 370–500 metres. It shot bolts or quarrels that could pierce most medieval armour. Other advantages of the crossbow were that it required only a few specialists with extensive training and tools to construct while the use of the weapon required little training. The crossbow and the longbow are two different weapon systems with solely their quick succession rate of shot compared in many modern assessments (precision, endurance, exploitation of opportunities are usually not taken into these comparisons). In the Middle Ages, both weapons co-existed, including the use of mounted crossbowmen on the British Islands and longbowmen from the British Isles down to Portugal and Italy.

Some crossbows were operated by teams of a shooter with an assistant to help to reload. The assistant could be armed with a spear and a very large shield known as a pavise to provide cover for them. This created one of the typical medieval mixed structures of crossbowmen and spearmen that were used with great success in the Hussite Wars and by Bertrand du Guesclin in his petty warfare reconquest of France during the Hundred Years' War.

==== Genoese crossbowmen ====
The best crossbowmen were considered to be Genoese crossbowmen from Italy, and their counterparts from the Iberian peninsula, such as Barcelona. In Spain crossbowmen were considered in rank equivalent to a cavalryman. The 14th century chronicler Ramon Muntaner believed the Catalans to be the best crossbowmen, because they were capable of maintaining their own weapons.

Crossbow guilds were common in many cities across Europe and crossbow competitions were held. These not only provided a pool of skilled crossbowmen but also reflect the social standing of the crossbowmen. Records of the Guild of St. George in Ghent show an organisation of some sophistication, fielding uniformed crossbowmen organised in companies under officers and standard-bearers, with support services such as pavise carriers (targedragers) and surgeons. Similarly organised co-fraternities of crossbowmen were present in French towns and cities in the 15th. century. Crossbowmen made up a significant proportion of Italian militias in the 13th and 14th century, again organised into units with officers, standards and pavise bearers. In some cities, such as Lucca, they were organised into elite and ordinary classes.

==== Crossbowmen on the battlefield ====
Crossbowmen generally opened a battle by skirmishing ahead of the army, as at the Battle of Courtrai, or were placed to cover the flanks, as at the Battle of Campaldino.

== Medieval military revolution ==
Ayton and Price identify three components to what they call the "military revolution" occurring at the end of the Middle Ages; a rise in the importance of infantry to the detriment of heavy cavalry, increasing use of gunpowder weapons on the battlefield and sieges, as well as social, political, and fiscal changes allowing the growth of larger armies. The first of these components to manifest itself as the now-debunked "infantry revolution", which developed during the 14th century. Initial victories like Courtrai or Morgarten were strongly dependent on use of terrain but over the course of the century two effective infantry systems developed; the infantry block, armed with spears and polearms, epitomised by the Swiss and the practice of combining dismounted men-at-arms with infantry with ranged weapons, typified by the English longbowman.

The infantry revolution did not render heavy cavalry obsolete. Improvements in armour for man and horse allowed cavalry to retain an important role into the 16th century. Instead, the three components of revolution identified by Ayton and Price led to a rebalancing of the elements of the medieval tactical system, opening the way for an integrated arms approach in the 16th century.

== See also ==
- List of medieval weapons
- Schiltron
