= Napoleonic weaponry and warfare =

Weaponry of the Napoleonic Wars (1803–1815)

The warfare of the Napoleonic Wars (1803–1815) involved sweeping changes in tactics, organization, armament, and naval combat for all nations involved. Armies grew in size through the introduction of mass conscription, notably in France with the levée en masse, allowing entire populations to be mobilized for military service. The French army developed the corps system, organizing forces into semi-independent corps with infantry, cavalry, and artillery, which could maneuver and fight separately or together. This was supported by rapid marches that gave French forces a speed advantage on campaign.

Infantry tactics evolved across Europe. French forces often used a combination of dense columns for attack and skirmishers in mixed order, aiming for shock and flexibility. Austrian infantry typically formed battalion masses that could absorb attacks but sacrificed some mobility. The Prussian army, after early defeats, reformed using the Krümper system, training small groups in rotation to build a large reserve, and gradually shifted toward more flexible tactics. The British army relied on the thin red line, a two-deep infantry formation designed for firepower and defense, supported by disciplined volleys and steadfast discipline. Despite these developments, much of the fighting still took place with line infantry deployed in close order, maximizing firepower but exposing troops to heavy casualties.

Command structures differed among the major powers. The French relied on senior marshals under Napoleon’s central direction, efficiently managing multiple corps. The Prussians began creating a general staff that laid the groundwork for modern military planning and coordination. The Austrians managed operations through the Hofkriegsrat, a centralized council of war, while the British command structure remained closely tied to traditional regimental systems and the Duke of Wellington’s personal leadership. Staff work, operational planning, and orders became increasingly systematic, especially as armies grew larger and battlefields wider.

Armaments also saw improvement. Muskets remained the primary weapon, but light infantry and skirmishers often carried rifled muskets for greater range and accuracy. Artillery became more mobile and effective, with the French focusing on massed batteries and flexible deployment. Cavalry units retained their importance for both shock action and reconnaissance, although the expanded use of prepared positions and defensive squares reduced their effectiveness during some battles.

== Organisation ==
=== Leadership and control ===
The armies in the Napoleonic Wars did not know a general staff in modern sense except for Prussia, who created such staff in 1807.The armed forces of a nation was usually under the command of a single person, the ruler or a representative appointed by him. While former armies were once assembled for individual campaigns and then disbanded, the mass conscription introduced by Napoleon made it nearly impossible to control such large troops by a single commander. In order to address the problem the French developed the corps system. This system envisioned permanent corps that were in effect miniature armies acting independently if required, each with its own cavalry and artillery complements attached to two or three infantry divisions. Other armies followed suit creating their own permanent corps.

An army usually consisted of several corps or divisions varying in size depending on nation or campaign commanded by a marshal a general or a major- or lieutenent-general. Divisions were further split into several brigades under a brigade-general comprising several infantry or cavalry or artillery regiments. Regiments under the command of a colonel or lieutenent-colonel consisted of several infantry battalions cavalry squadrons or artillery batteries. A battalion commanded by a lieutenant-colonel or major could further divided into a company (captain) and platoon (lieutenant) and a squadron into a troop.

=== Troops ===
In the eighteenth century, European warfare was shaped by limited aims and carefully regulated violence. Armies were instruments of monarchs, fighting for dynastic interests or territory, not for national causes. The population as a whole was largely untouched by war, which remained the business of rulers and their professional soldiers. Armies were small, discipline was strict, and officers came from noble families. Tactics and strategy were shaped by calculation and caution. Wars had little impact on the everyday lives of most people and rarely threatened the existence of states.

After 1789, the French Revolution introduced a new spirit into warfare. Clausewitz observed that war became an affair of the people rather than of kings. National survival, not merely the conquest of a province, now became the objective. As revolutionary France mobilized to defend itself, numbers were dramatically increased. The French levée en masse called the entire population to the war effort: young men fought; others forged weapons, supplied food, or provided support. Promotion was now open to talent rather than privilege, and merit on the battlefield became the main path to advancement.

Voluntary enlistment quickly proved insufficient for sustaining armies of this size. Conscription was introduced, ensuring that military service became a matter of civic duty for all eligible men. This produced large armies that dwarfed those of previous wars. By 1794, France fielded about 750,000 soldiers. The amalgamation of the old royal army and new conscripts created fighting forces of a new character. Social barriers in the military were lowered. Officers became closer to their men, and armies operated without the rigid barriers of the earlier era. Napoleon perfected this system, organizing large-scale, highly mobile operations with armies far larger than those before the Revolution. Battles that once drew tens of thousands now saw hundreds of thousands. Campaigns such as Ulm, Jena, and the Russian invasion showed the ability of national armies to mobilize on a massive scale. Other states recognized the need to change if they hoped to remain competitive.

Prussia, after defeat by Napoleon, also introduced reforms. The post-Tilsit era saw the start of conscription linked to political and social reform. Universal service replaced the old professional army. The officer corps became more open. By 1813, conscription allowed Prussia to field much larger armies. Though limits and inequalities persisted, the idea that all citizens owed the state military service had taken root. Across Europe, as war became an affair for whole nations, the scale and ambition of wars increased. The principles of limited war faded. The objective in war became the complete defeat of the enemy, not simply a change in borders. Large-scale mobilization, mass armies, national fervor, and the expansion of military participation became central features of 19th-century warfare.

Earlier suggestions for a citizen militia had existed before the Revolution, but only with the political upheavals of the period did the “nation in arms” become reality. The result was warfare that involved all classes, affected all communities, and required the entire resources of a country. By the end of the Napoleonic era, both French and Prussian systems had moved toward this concept, though logistics, exemptions, and inequalities remained. Victories and defeats now relied not just on the skill of generals and the steadiness of troops, but on the national resolve and resources behind the armies. By the time of Waterloo, armies of hundreds of thousands fought decisive campaigns. The change from cabinet wars to wars of mass conscription produced new military and political realities that shaped Europe for the next century.

=== Medical services ===
Medical services during the Napoleonic Wars operated under harsh conditions. Injuries caused by musket balls and round shot were severe, often resulting in shattered limbs or traumatic wounds. Surgeons had limited tools and almost no effective pain relief, relying mainly on opium, laudanum, or alcohol when available. Supplies ran out quickly in fierce battles. Operations were performed as fast as possible since speed increased survival chances. Amputating an arm might take one minute, a leg two. Early removal of a damaged limb was seen as the only option for survival in many cases.

Wounded soldiers could not rely on help from comrades to reach the rear. Many lay for hours, exposed to further injury or even death if enemy troops advanced again. Evacuation was usually slow and difficult. Makeshift stretchers or carts were used if available. Some armies tried to introduce horse-drawn ambulances, but these remained rare and often only for elite units. Treatment began wherever space could be found, often in tents or nearby buildings. Surgeons worked under extreme pressure and with a constant shortage of medical supplies. Overcrowded field hospitals exposed wounded men to further risk of infection. Gangrene was common due to poor hygiene. Despite this, amputation survival rates ranged from sixty to eighty-eight percent, depending on the skill of the surgeon and the conditions.

Disease killed more soldiers than wounds. Malarial fevers and other illnesses spread rapidly in unhealthy camp sites, especially near marshes or stagnant water. Medical advice could be unreliable, and many old treatments like bloodletting were still used. The army’s medical service included surgeons, doctors, pharmacists, and orderlies, but the number of trained professionals was usually far too low for the needs at the front. Field hospital conditions were inconsistent. Occasionally, more organized systems or hospitals in major cities offered better care, but shortages and overcrowding remained common. Recovery depended heavily on quick evacuation and the degree of organization in each army or corps. Medical care improved only slightly during the wars, but it consistently lagged behind the demands created by large-scale warfare and epidemic disease.

== Strategy ==
=== On land ===
Napoleon did not lay out a fixed set of strategic rules, but he read extensively and learned from historical commanders and theorists. He combined the lessons of the past with new realities like mass conscription and simplified logistics. This allowed for faster movement and greater operational flexibility. Napoleon benefited from having a professional army, unity of command, and clear strategic aims. He served as both head of state and commander, so he alone set strategy. He focused almost always on destroying the enemy’s main force and cared less about occupying territory or cities.

When facing numerically superior enemies, Napoleon used the central position strategy. He would separate the enemy’s forces and concentrate most of his own army on one wing, overwhelming it before the other could give support. After one wing was defeated, he would quickly move his army against the second, breaking both wings in succession while preventing them from reuniting. When he enjoyed numerical superiority, Napoleon often used the Manœuvre sur les derrières or rear manoeuvre. He distracted the enemy with part of his force while moving the bulk of his army to cut their supply lines and communications. This forced the enemy to fight on his terms. He blocked reinforcement routes with smaller detachments, making the main body more vulnerable to defeat.

The strategic penetration, another approach, saw Napoleon pushing deeply through weak points and using captured positions to disrupt the enemy’s rear and plans. Napoleon moved his army quickly by living off the land, avoiding long supply lines. He believed speed multiplied the power of his forces. To avoid facing all the major continental powers at once, Napoleon tried to maintain divisions among them through diplomacy and alliances. He benefited from the rivalry and differing interests of Russia, Austria, and Prussia, ensuring that no unified coalition formed against him for many years.

Napoleon’s rivals adapted their strategies in response. The allies crafted the Trachenberg Plan, which advised their forces to avoid direct battle with Napoleon himself and target his subordinates instead.The Russian army relied on scorched earth, destroying resources and retreating to deny Napoleon supplies. This limited his ability to live off the land and forced prolonged marches. The British relied on naval support, avoided major battles, and maintained secure lines of retreat and supply. Each of these approaches aimed to neutralize Napoleon’s strengths and prevent the rapid, decisive victories he usually sought.

=== At sea ===
British strategy relied on tactical concentration—often bringing superior numbers to bear at a decisive point. Close blockades were enforced on ports like Brest and Toulon, which demanded significant logistical organization. Convoy systems protected trade, and amphibious operations were developed to support land campaigns. Prize money and other financial rewards encouraged aggressive action and could be lucrative for crews and officers. Recruitment for the British navy used a mixture of coercion and voluntary incentives. The Impress Service seized men for service, while quotas imposed obligations on counties to provide seamen. Volunteer recruits were drawn by bounties and the prospect of prize money.

The French navy began the period focused on invasion plans, amassing thousands of transports for an army at Boulogne. Over time, a strategy of attrition was adopted, building ships in multiple ports to counter British numbers, while privateering targeted British commerce. French leadership was cautious, often avoiding battle to preserve the fleet. Organizational challenges plagued the French navy after the Revolution, including shortages of experienced officers and disruption to training and discipline. Military reforms under Napoleon included new artillery corps, centralized administration, and expanded mandatory service lists. Still, operational experience remained limited compared to the Royal Navy.

== Armament ==
=== Small arms and blade weapons ===
Exploded view of the Charleville musket, the primary French firearm

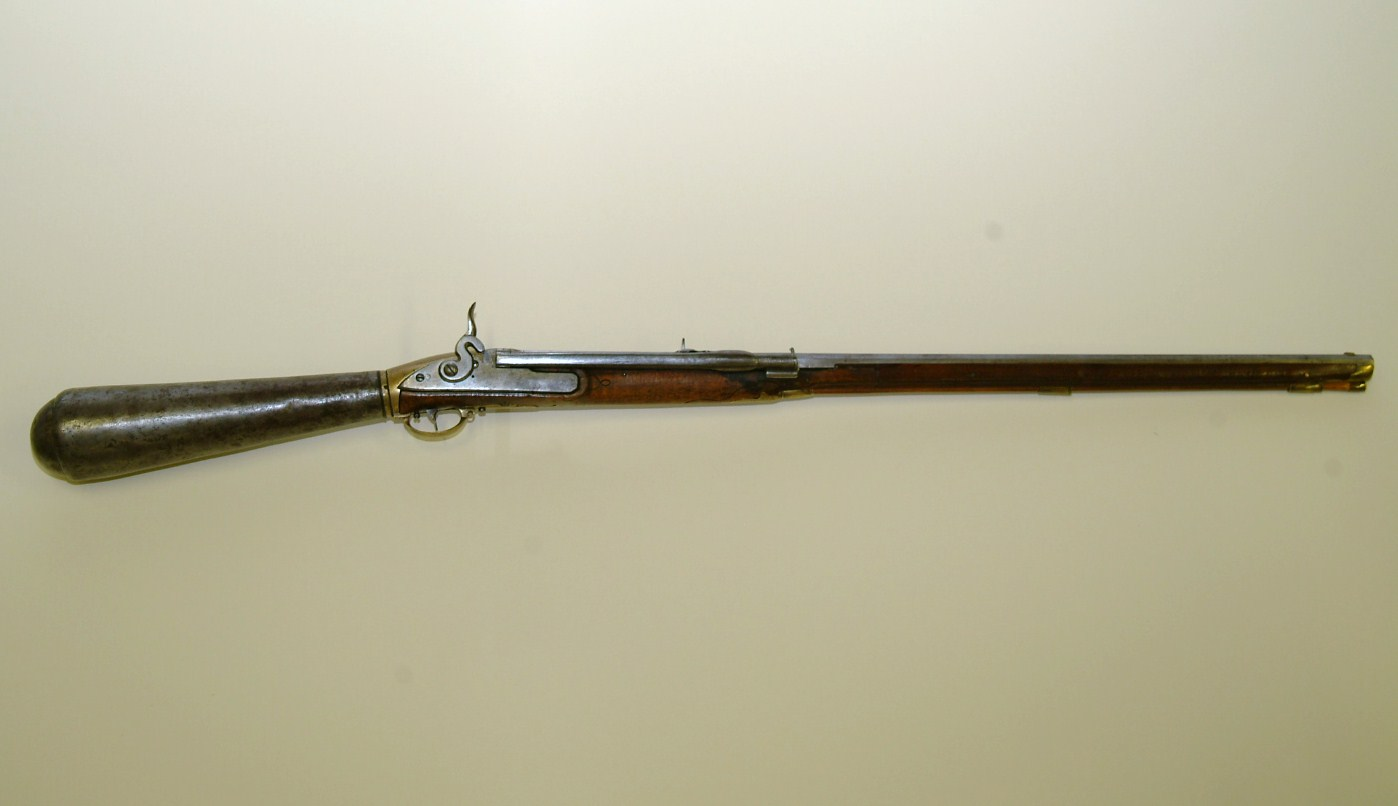
The Girardoni M1780 repeating air rifle

The standard weapon of the time was the flintlock smooth-bore musket that fired a lead ball ( .60 – .76 in) between 100 and 300 yards. To fire the musket the charge of gunpower and the ball had to be inserted into the barrel from the muzzle by a ramrod. Once this was done the hammer had to be drawn back on to “half-cock” in order to pour some powder into the priming pan and afterwards putting the frizzen up-right to close the pan cover. The hammer was then drawn back an extra notch to full-cock, which make the musket ready to fire. Properly trained infantry were able to fire two or three volleys a minute. The cavalry usually were equippted with the carbine or the cavalry musket. These short barrelled firearms allowed the cavalry the act as skirmishers both on foot and from horseback. A well-trained regiment was even capable of firing a volley while on horseback.

Besides guns, soldiers used a variety of pikes, swords, and bayonets for close range or melee combat. Officers, sergeants, other higher-ranked officials, and cavalry mainly used swords, while the majority of infantry soldiers were equipped with bayonets. Besides the usage of the firearms, cavalry typically wielded straight or curved sabres Throughout the Napoleonic Wars, rifle muskets were also introduced into the battlefield first by the Prussians. Such rifle muskets were substantially more accurate at a maximum range of 200 yards because the barrel put spin on the bullet. Despite this advantage, rifles were more expensive and took longer to load as a greater pressure was needed to insert the ball into the barrel.

The British did utilise the rifle such as the Baker Pattern 1800 Infantry rifle equipping some units, most notably with the creation of an entire elite rifle regiment, the 95th Regiment (Rifles). The Austrian Army introduced the Girardoni M1780 repeating air rifle (Repetierwindbüchse) as a specialist weapon and used them in the Napoleonic Wars. A multi-shot breech loader, with a 20-shot magazine, it had an effective full charge range to about 150 yd (140 m). It was complex and needed a significant infrastructure to support it.

=== Artillery ===
During the Napoleonic Wars, four main types of artillery were used: guns (cannons), howitzers, and mortars. Guns fired solid roundshot on flat trajectories. Artillery pieces were smoothbore, muzzle-loading tubes of cast metal, sealed at one end with a vent for ignition. Trunnions on the sides secured the tube to its carriage. Longer barrels generally led to greater accuracy, but keeping the gap between bore and projectile (windage) small also improved accuracy. They were classified by the weight of the shot they fired, ranging from 3 to 36 pounds, and were further grouped as light, medium, heavy, long, or short guns.

Howitzers featured a larger bore relative to their weight compared to guns. They fired shells at high angles using lower charges. Their barrels were short, and their trunnions were set at the reinforce. Different countries classified howitzers by either bore size (in inches or national equivalents) or weight of shot. Mortars were very short, high-angle weapons reserved for siege work. Some mortars fired at a fixed elevation, changing range by varying powder charges, while others allowed for elevation adjustments using a wedge device called a quoin. The Coehorn mortar was small, portable by two men, and fired shells or grenades to about 140 meters.

Field artillery used three main types of ammunition: roundshot, explosive shells, and anti-personnel rounds such as grape, canister, and spherical case (also called shrapnel). Special types were sometimes used, such as incendiaries for burning structures or illuminating shells. Mortars and howitzers fired hollow iron shells filled with gunpowder and fitted with a fuse. Even if these shells failed to explode, they could frighten enemy troops. Grapeshot consisted of several iron or lead balls around a wooden core, wrapped in cloth, while canister rounds were metal or wooden cases filled with small iron balls.

On firing, canister cases broke apart and scattered the balls like a huge shotgun. Double canister charges could be fired at close range for increased effect. Grapeshot and canister were highly effective against infantry and cavalry formations. Howitzers and larger guns could fire spherical case (shrapnel), a shell with musket balls around a bursting charge. For sieges, garrison defense, and coastal artillery, hot shot was sometimes used. Heated and then fired, these solid balls aimed to start fires in ships, buildings, or flammable defenses. All ordnance was mounted on carriages, constructed from either iron or wood. Carriages were type-specific, serving in field, siege, garrison, coastal, or naval roles.

== Tactics ==
=== Infantry ===
During the Napoleonic Wars, the Line infantry was the backbone of the army. In battle troops would march in two to three rows shoulder on shoulder towards the enemy with some 75 paces per minute until they had reached effective range between 80 and 100 meters.They would then either exchange fire withdraw, or hasten their speed to launch a bayonet assault. They would anticipate being able to repeat the dosage one or twice prior to the bayonet charge if the denfender shot first at that range. Along with the line there were two other formations, the column and the square. The column was used for moving troops across the battlefield and for long-distance marches. The square was required for defense against cavalry. Although the line prevailed in battle several other forms were tested such as the mixed order or the battalion mass.

Control on the battlefield was challenging, mainly due to smoke and noise, which reduced visibility and communication. Orders relied on loud commands or musical signals such as bugle calls and drums, especially during skirmishing when troops spread out. Volley fire was effective only at limited range, so artillery supported the infantry by moving forward, providing an initial bombardment, then repositioning as the lines advanced or fell back. Readiness before combat included checking muskets, preparing cartridges, and distributing first aid materials.

Light infantry, operated ahead of the main formations. They scouted the terrain, provided early warning, and disrupted enemy movements. Skirmishers used open order tactics, keeping distance from each other to make themselves harder targets. They often moved over rough terrain or took cover behind natural obstacles. Skirmishers used aimed, controlled fire to harass enemy troops and artillery crews. In attack, skirmishers screened the advance of main units and concealed their movements. Their fire was meant to disorder and unsettle the enemy before the main assault. On defense, they delayed attacking forces by pestering them with accurate shots, forcing attackers to halt or break their advance.

They were expected not to waste ammunition and only fire when it was likely to be effective. Light infantrymen normally acted in pairs and were taught to aim at individual targets. Skirmishers withdrew before the main assault began, passing back through gaps in friendly lines or taking cover so that regular infantry could advance. If unable to withdraw directly, they moved to the flanks to continue their work or to capture prisoners. Skirmishers also covered retreats, or slowing pursuers with harassing fire.

=== Artillery ===
Artillery played an essential role in specific scenarios, such as breaking enemy formations from a distance, bombarding fortifications, and countering enemy artillery. Field artillery included a range of calibers, with larger guns used to destroy barriers and smaller ones for targeting enemy troops. Tactics varied according to target type, distance, and density of formations. Round shot was used at long ranges, while canister was saved for close combat or against extended lines and cavalry. Artillery batteries were positioned ahead of the infantry to minimize risks and provide effective crossfire, while officers focused on concentrated fire rather than dispersion to maximize psychological impact on enemy troops.

Fire discipline was key, with methods adjusted to maintain pressure on advancing enemies and avoid wasting ammunition. Coordination with the infantry was crucial, and artillery often prioritized demoralization over mere casualties, aiming to break enemy resolve with concentrated losses. Some armies adopted ricochet techniques, but effectiveness depended on terrain and context, with direct fire generally favored in field battles.

Artillery's positioning was guided by practical considerations, avoiding steep hills in favor of gentle slopes for visibility and firing range. The use of terrain improved accuracy and reduced vulnerability to counterattack. Specialized guns and howitzers became more prominent, and debate persisted over whether artillery should prioritize enemy troops or counter-battery actions. Light support guns had both advantages and limitations, often affecting morale but lacking the power of heavier guns. Armies learned through experience to adjust tactics and positioning for optimal battlefield performance, making artillery an increasingly complex but still secondary component in Napoleonic warfare.

=== Cavalry ===
Light cavalry's offensive and defensive responsibilities were basically reconnaissance plus main column advance, flank, rear, and outpost defense. The hussars were mostly restricted to patrolling the countryside around the main infantry columns. They would operate in squadrons in combat order, either in echelon or straight lines. The leading squadron's troops would gallop outward and form a screen of sharpshooters across the regiment's front if they happened to come across the enemy.

The Hussar skirmishers would adopt stationary positions and fire a carbine volley at the adversary from a distance of about 100 yards if the enemy engaged in combat. They would then charge with a sabre dangling from a swordknot at the wrist and a handgun in the right hand. They would discharge the pistol after closing the quarters, then move the gun to their left hand to launch a sabre assault. For maximum effect on the enemy ranks, the squadrons would advance in long waves that were obliquely staggered to the right or left in situations where such a charge required the regiment's whole backup.

The hussars performed during defensive maneuvers in the same way but in reverse. To deny the adversary a movement advantage, they would stay in touch with them and look for an engagement as soon as possible. By doing this, they would hope to conceal the movements of the infantry that was positioned behind them. Chasseurs and lancers played a similar duty to that of hussars. The heavy cavalry's role was to confront enemy formations head-on and tear their ranks open for infantry exploitation, while the light cavalry conducted reconnaissance and engaged in combat. The heavy cavalry was centered on the carabiniers and cuirassiers.

=== Naval tactics ===
Gunnery was technically similar across navies, with some differences in tactical focus. The British generally aimed to hit the hull, inflicting maximum casualties and disabling guns. French and Spanish gun crews often focused on masts and rigging to limit the opposing ship’s ability to maneuver or escape. If the range closed to within musket shot, gun captains were usually left to fire at will, timing their shots according to the movement of both their own deck and enemy hull.

Naval tactics focused on maneuvering ships to concentrate firepower and achieve advantageous positions. The broadside, delivered at right angles to the target, was the most effective means of inflicting damage. However, weapons had limited arcs of fire, and ships were most vulnerable at the bow or stern—the so-called raking position. A ship crossing an enemy’s stern could fire the length of the decks, causing high casualties and disabling steering or sails, but only for a brief moment.

In fleet actions, formations were typically line ahead, where each ship followed the one in front, allowing for mutual support and easier signaling. Achieving and maintaining the weather gauge—to windward of the enemy—was a priority, granting a fleet better scope for attack or disengagement. Once battle was joined, melee often resulted, with ships locked at very close range and confusion reigning. The focus shifted from admirals’ commands to initiative and coordination by individual captains.

== See also ==
- Military history of France
- Napoleonic tactics

== Sources ==
- Adkin, Mark (2005). The Trafalgar Companion. London: Aurum Press. ISBN 1-8451-3018-9.
- Adkin, Mark (2011). The Waterloo Companion. Mechanicsburg: Stackpole Books. ISBN 0-8117-1854-9.
- Archer, Christon I.; Ferris, John R.; Herwig, Holger H.; Travers, Timothy H. E. (2003). World history of Warfare. London: Cassell. ISBN 0-3043-6352-9.
- Battershaw, Brian (1962). History of the German General Staff. New York: Praeger.
- Black, Jeremy (1994). European warfare, 1660-1815. New Haven: Yale University Press. ISBN 0-3000-6170-6.
- Bond, Brian (1972). The Victorian Army and the Staff College, 1854-1914. London: Eyre Methuen. ISBN 0-4132-7630-9.
- Dawson, Anthony L.; Dawson, Paul L.; Summerfield, Stephen (2007). Napoleonic Artillery. Ramsbury: Crowood Press. ISBN 978-1-86126-9232.
- Gibbs, N. H. (2008). "Armed Forces and the Art of War". War and Peace in the Age of Upheaval 1793-1830. The New Cambridge Modern History. Vol. IX. Cambridge: Cambridge University Press. ISBN 0-521-04547-9.
- Haythornthwaite, Philip J. (1988). Napoleon's Military Machine. Speldhurst: Spellmount. ISBN 0-9467-7166-9.
- Haythornthwaite, Philip J. (1979). Weapons and Equipment of the Napoleonic Wars. Poole: Blandford Press. ISBN 0-7137-0906-5.
- Kaufman, H. (2003). Musket-ball and Sabre Injuries from the First Half of the Nineteenth Century. Edinburgh: Royal College of Surgeons. ISBN 0-9503620-7-7.
- Lynn, John A. (1995). Nations in Arms 1763-1815. The Cambridge Illustrated History of Warfare. Cambridge: Cambridge University Press. ISBN 0-5214-4073-4.
- McNab, Chris (2009). Armies of the Napoleonic Wars: An Illustrated History. Oxford: Osprey Publishing. ISBN 978-1-84603-470-1.
- Nosworthy, Brent (1996). With Musket, Cannon, and Sword : Battle Tactics of Napoleon and his Enemies. New York: Sarpedon. ISBN 1-8851-1927-5.
- Petre, Francis Loraine (1974). Napoleon's last campaign in Germany 1813. London: Arms and Armour Press. ISBN 0-8825-4264-8.
- Pope, Stephen (1999). The Cassell dictionary of the Napoleonic Wars. London: Cassel. ISBN 0-3043-5229-2.
- Rathbone, Julian (1994). Wellington's War, or, 'Atty, the long-nosed Bugger that Licks the French'. London: Michael Joseph. ISBN 0-7181-3841-4.
- Roberts, Andrew (2014). Napoleon: A Life. London: Penguin. ISBN 978-0-69817628-7.
- Ross, Steven T. (1979). From Flintlock to Rifle : Infantry Tactics, 1740-1866. Rutherford: Fairleigh Dickinson University Press.
- Rothenberg, Gunther E. (1995). Napoleon's Great adversary : Archduke Charles and the Austrian Army, 1792-1814. New York: Sarpedon. ISBN 1-8851-1921-6.
- Rothenberg, Gunther E. (1980). The art of warfare in the age of Napoleon. Bloomington: Indiana University Press. ISBN 0-2533-1076-8.
- Stone, David R. (2006). A Military History of Russia : from Ivan the Terrible to the War in Chechnya. Westport: Praeger. ISBN 0-2759-8502-4.
- Snow, Peter (2010). To War with Wellington : From the Peninsula to Waterloo. London: John Murray. ISBN 1-8485-4103-1.
- White, Jonathan Randall (1996). The Prussian Army 1640-1871. Lanham: University Press of America. ISBN 0-7618-0205-3.
