= Napoleonic tactics =

Field tactics deployed in combat from the late 18th to the mid 19th century

Napoleonic tactics are certain battlefield principles used by national armies from the late 18th century until the invention and adoption of the rifled musket in the mid 19th century. Napoleonic tactics are characterised by intense drilling of soldiers; speedy battlefield movement; combined arms assaults between infantry, cavalry, and artillery; relatively small numbers of cannon; short-range musket fire; and bayonet charges. French Emperor Napoleon I is considered by military historians to have been a master of this particular form of warfare. Military powers would continue to employ such tactics even as technological advancements during the industrial revolutions gradually rendered them impractically obsolete, leading to devastating losses of life in the American Civil War, the Franco-Prussian War, and World War I.

== Infantry tactics ==
Infantry formed the base of Napoleonic tactics as they were the largest force in all of the major battles of 18th and 19th century Europe. Many Napoleonic tactics were developed by ancien régime royalist strategists like Jean-Baptiste Vaquette de Gribeauval; Jean-Pierre du Teil; Jacques Antoine Hippolyte; and Pierre-Joseph Bourcet. They emphasised the "flexible use of artillery" and they "abandoned marching in lines (which maximised a unit's firepower) in favour of attacking in columns."

Infantry used the smoothbore, flintlock musket, the standard weapon of the Napoleonic era, which had scarcely changed since John Churchill, 1st Duke of Marlborough, directed English troops at the Battle of Blenheim in 1704. The flintlock musket had a short effective range for hitting man-sized shops of 50 yards (46 m) to 70 yards (64 m). A highly trained soldier could fire once about every 15–20 seconds until black powder fouled and the weapon had to be cleaned before firing again. The French musket of 1777 could fire about 100 yards (91 m) but "suffered about one misfire out of every six rounds."

Many soldiers on Napoleonic battlefields were coerced into staying in battle. To overcome their individual inclination to self-preservation and to provide effective firepower, the infantry regiments fought shoulder-to-shoulder, at least two or three lines deep, firing in volleys. The officers and non-commissioned officers carried swords and halberds which could be used to keep the infantrymen in the firing line. Should a soldier shirk duty and flee from the field of battle, each army normally had a picket line of cavalry at its rear encouraging the soldier to return to his regiment. To assist with command and control of the infantry, each soldier would wear a colourful military uniform visible from a distance, even through the black-powder clouds hovering over the battlefield. Napoleon did not underestimate the importance of morale and said once that, "Moral force rather than numbers decides victory."

=== Infantry in the battlefield ===
Most Napoleonic battles took place on farm fields, villages, roads, and streams; French troops regarded cities, mountains, swamps, and heavy woods as unsuitable combat arenas. Commanders, such as the Duke of Wellington at the Battle of Waterloo, sought out terrain suitable for their forces. Infantry regiments used three primary battle formations: column formation, line formation, and infantry square (square formation).

The column formation was narrow and long, suited for soldiers marching down a road or moving quickly towards the enemy across an open field. Because the column formation was a large target for muskets and cannon, regiments would normally change formation as the enemy drew closer.

The line formation was made up of two or three solid lines of infantry, which helped present as many muskets as possible allowing the unit to control a wider portion of the battlefield than a column and maximising the firepower of the unit. The lack of depth in the thin line formation allowed for artillery fire to be much less effective against a unit using the line formation. The long lines proved difficult to sustain because of the need to remain solid over long distances and from disruptions like ditches, fences, and trees on the battlefield. The line formation also fell prey to cavalry charges since the horses could cover the final 50 yards (46 m) while only receiving a single volley of fire from the infantry.

The infantry square used 4–6 ranks in depth with a square or rectangular shape to protect infantry from cavalry charges with the goal of not presenting the rear or sides of the soldiers to cavalry. The square consisted of fairly short columns in a square-like formation with generally 1 to 2 rows of men on each side with fixed bayonets and muskets pointed outward. The exposure of the bayonets would prevent head-on charges of cavalry into the squares and thus were quite effective. The unit could move in square, but the square model proved slower than a column and more vulnerable to musket and cannon fire, so if enemy infantry were a more proximate threat than cavalry, the unit would shift from square to line formation.

A fourth formation, considered a specialty of the French Army, was l'ordre mixte, a mix of line and column used for pressing an attack against enemy infantry. It had some of the "weight" of the column formation for pushing through an opposing line, but some companies in line formation to offset some of the column formation's vulnerability to fire. However this was rarely used because it was thought of as an unnecessary compromise, and line formation or square formation often had better results.

The light infantry, normally composed of men less than 5 feet, 6 inches in height, would precede their regiment as it approached an enemy unit. Their duty was to harass the enemy with scattered musket fire and to try to force back the enemy's skirmishers attempting to do the same. The light infantry fought as skirmishers, rather than shoulder-to-shoulder, taking advantage of the room between soldiers and all bits of cover to move towards the enemy while firing and reloading. Eventually, the line infantry and grenadier companies of the regiment would overtake the light infantry which would then resume its place in the regimental firing line. The line infantry, typically men 5 feet, 6 inches to 5 feet, 11 inches in height, would normally begin volley fire at ranges of less than 100 yards (91 m). The initial volley was very important as it was the one offering the most visibility and best chance of hitting the enemy. The shock troops of the regiment were the grenadiers, typically men at least 6 feet in height, normally wearing tall headgear such as a bearskin to enhance the effect. They often led a charge or a counter-charge when the fighting was at its most desperate. After some volleys were exchanged, officers would then use their judgement to determine the best time to charge the enemy with the fixed bayonet. After the thunder and casualties of close-range musket fire, the sight of a well-formed infantry unit approaching with bayonets fixed was often too much and a unit would flee the battlefield. As a result of this fear, inspired by the shining metal of the bayonet, a bayonet charge rarely ever caught much other than the bravest enemy infantry, before the remaining opposition either flees or routs.

==== French infantry terminology and tactical application ====
French tactical writing distinguished several formations and modes of action that Napoleon used flexibly according to terrain, enemy disposition, and the phase of battle. The ordre mince ("thin order") described infantry deployed in a shallow line, usually two or three ranks deep, maximizing the number of muskets that could fire. The contrasting ordre profond ("deep order") referred to troops formed in greater depth, typically in columns that were easier to maneuver and control during the approach. French practice did not require a single formation for every attack: Napoleon employed line, column, square and combinations of these according to circumstances.

The characteristic French use of tirailleurs (skirmishers) linked these formations. Light infantry or detached companies advanced in open order ahead of the main body to screen its movement, harass enemy troops, and disrupt the opposing line before the close-order infantry arrived. French Revolutionary and Napoleonic armies expanded this practice considerably; contemporary French tactical development emphasized an attack in column preceded by numerous tirailleurs, while later scholarship describes the large-scale use of skirmishers in support of close-order infantry as one of the important innovations of Revolutionary warfare.

The ordre mixte ("mixed order") sought to combine the firepower of the line with the maneuverability and depth of the column by placing some battalions or sub-units in line and others in column. The term colonne d'attaque also appeared in the French Règlement of 1791, although historians caution that translating it simply as "attack column" can imply a universal doctrine of charging in deep columns that the regulation itself did not prescribe. When threatened by cavalry, infantry could instead form the carré (square), presenting bayonets on all sides; Napoleon notably used square formations against Mamluk cavalry during the Egyptian campaign.

French infantry doctrine remained influential in the United States into the Civil War era. Dennis Hart Mahan, who taught many future Union and Confederate commanders at West Point, stated that the tactical systems used by the United States Army were derived from the French, while West Point instruction also familiarized cadets with the Napoleonic interpretation of Antoine-Henri Jomini. The persistence of French-derived formations was increasingly challenged by rifled small arms and entrenchments; by 1864 officers such as Emory Upton were experimenting with new assault methods rather than relying solely upon the broad battle line inherited from French practice.

== Cavalry tactics ==
Cavalry units had many responsibilities on the battlefield. As they were mounted on horses, they were the fastest-moving forces. They would perform "screening" duties which consisted of identifying the size, strength, and location of enemy forces while trying to prevent the enemy from doing the same.

Cavalry also provided the shock element on the Napoleonic era battlefield, much like a tank in the 20th and 21st centuries. The short effective range, long reload times, and rapid fouling of the smoothbore musket meant that cavalry units could quickly close in on infantry units before the horsemen could be overwhelmed with musket fire. Cavalry units were also responsible for fixing enemy forces in place, typically by charging at infantry units which would respond by forming into semi-static "squares". If the infantry unit failed to form square, quite often they would be overrun by the charging cavalry and forced to flee the battlefield en masse. Cavalry units often fought against other cavalry units to essentially neutralise one another. The speed of cavalry units made them capable of surprising enemy forces, especially as these battlefields were often covered in thick smoke generated by the black powder muskets, cannon, and howitzer. Cavalry units also protected generals and marshals since these officers were usually mounted and were likely to move too quickly on the battlefield to be protected by infantry.

=== Cavalry on the battlefield ===
Cavalry units required a great deal of logistical support as the horses consumed much forage and would tire quickly galloping in combat. They also were ill-suited for holding terrain as the troopers' smoothbore carbines were very short-ranged and the troopers were primarily trained to fight on horseback. Some of the dragoon units fought on foot and used horseback to move around. Cavalry units were vulnerable to artillery fire as the horses were large targets. Typically when cavalry units would charge artillery, they would suffer many casualties while inflicting few on the artillery in return. The artillery crews would ordinarily fire until the horsemen were nearby and then retreat to the safety of a friendly infantry unit in square. At this point, cavalry were trained to bring along headless nails to "spike" the guns by hammering these nails into the touch hole near the breech of the cannon, thereby rendering it useless on the battlefield.

==== French cavalry terminology and tactical application ====
French cavalry doctrine distinguished broadly between cavalerie légère (light cavalry) and grosse cavalerie (heavy or battle cavalry). Hussars and chasseurs performed reconnaissance, screening, flank protection, harassment and pursuit, while cuirassiers and other heavy formations were intended primarily for shock action. Napoleon often concentrated mounted regiments into large masses so that cavalry could cover the army during approach marches, threaten the enemy's reconnaissance, intervene at a decisive moment in battle, and pursue a defeated opponent.

The central idea was the choc (shock) produced by a cohesive charge rather than sustained firearm use from horseback. French cavalry normally approached in column and deployed into a two-rank line for combat. Regiments could attack en ligne, en colonne, en échelons (in successive echelons), or en échiquier (a checkerboard-like arrangement of separated sub-units). The normal close-order charge was described as the charge en muraille, literally a charge "like a wall," emphasizing alignment and cohesion. Contemporary descriptions also used botte à botte ("boot to boot") for the compact formation regarded as essential to the psychological and physical effect of the charge.

An open-order cavalry attack, en fourrageurs, was exceptional and was used particularly against artillery, where dispersed horsemen presented more difficult targets than a dense line. Against unbroken infantry squares, however, cavalry was at a severe disadvantage unless artillery or infantry had first disrupted the formation. This illustrates the combined-arms character of Napoleonic tactics: artillery could weaken a square, infantry could fix or disorder it, and cavalry could then exploit the resulting rupture. French theorists consequently treated cavalry as an arm whose greatest value often came in completing or exploiting a victory rather than winning one unaided.

The French tactical inheritance also affected nineteenth-century American cavalry, although the Civil War rapidly modified its application. West Point instruction before the war was strongly shaped by French and Jominian military thought, and U.S. officers entered the conflict with assumptions derived from European combined-arms doctrine. Improved firearms, the extensive use of field fortifications, and the demands of reconnaissance and raiding increasingly encouraged cavalry to fight dismounted or perform operational screening and raiding rather than rely principally on the classical Napoleonic massed shock charge. U.S. Army historical analysis notes that Civil War experience produced a new informal doctrine with a changed role for cavalry and more flexible infantry formations even while official regulations lagged behind battlefield practice.

== Artillery composition and tactics ==
The Napoleonic era saw many developments in field artillery. Field artillery (also known as light artillery) is a class of mobile artillery that backs up armies on the battlefield. These guns were developed with an emphasis towards maneuverability, mobility, accuracy over long distance, and speed. Mobile artillery advancements date back to King Gustavus Adolphus of Sweden in the Thirty Years' War (1618–48). Adolphus is recognised as being the first military commander to mass his light artillery units into batteries and to employ them in combination with other arms. By the mid-18th century, commanders from various nations had arrived at the conclusion that mobile artillery that could accompany the rest of the army was a necessity. No longer would artillery's influence be limited to its immediate firing range. Field artillery would instead become a key component in shifting the tides on the battlefield. After the reorganisation of the army into corps, the French Army established semi-autonomous artillery formations that were led and coordinated by artillery officers. These formations were successful in demonstrating the potential tactical and offensive power of field artillery out on the battlefield.

During the Napoleonic period, field artillery consisted of foot artillery, horse artillery, and mountain artillery. Field artillery was organized into batteries, comprising for the most part between six to eight guns. A battery could also include one or two howitzers for indirect fire. A battery had a typical strength of six officers and between 100 and 150 men. The guns varied in caliber between six, eight, nine or twelve pounder. The cavalry had their own horse artillery which were lighter, and all the gun crews had their own mounts.

=== Artillery on the battlefield ===
Artillery was the most devastating weapon on the field during the Napoleonic era, and its use could leave the enemy troops demoralised. Solid metal cannonballs (also known as a "round shot") were commonly used artillery ammunition. They were effective against square formations and heavily packed columns when fired almost parallel to the ground for they would "bounce" into enemy forces with gruesome results. Essentially, the round shot would bounce a few times and start to roll, ripping through anything in its wake. Taking this into consideration, artillery crews often sought out hard, flat, and open terrain. At extremely close range, artillery could use canister shot, large tin cans holding a large number of small projectiles. Another variation of this was scattershot, a canister or heavy cloth bag filled with nails and other scrap iron. Basically, the firing of canisters was the equivalent of using a giant shotgun to disintegrate incoming troops. Yet another variation was grapeshot, a heavy cloth bag packed well with larger ammunition, which got its name from its appearance as being a bundle of grapes. Napoleon employed a variation of this tactic to crush the Vendémiaire uprising. The British during the wars used something that would become known as a shrapnel shell. Besides cannons, artillery was made up of howitzers and other type of guns that used ammunition that packed an explosive punch (also known as "explosive shells"). Explosive shells had a reputation of being unreliable since they would often explode either too early or not at all. However, in the cases in which the shell exploded on the target, the results were devastating, especially towards cavalry units.

==== Massed fire and French terminology ====
Napoleon increasingly concentrated multiple batteries at a decisive point into a grande batterie ("grand battery"). The tactical purpose was not merely to assemble guns, but to achieve a concentration des feux ("concentration of fires") by directing the fire of many pieces onto the same sector of the enemy position. French artillery histories describe Napoleon's use of guns en masse and his preference for making numerous fires converge on a single point; large batteries were used to prepare and support decisive infantry and cavalry movements.

The Battle of Wagram in 1809 became a prominent example of this method. French artillery was regrouped into a grande batterie of about 100 guns on a front of roughly 1,400 metres (1,500 yd), whose concentrated fire weakened the Austrian position before the attack by Jacques MacDonald. The increasing use of such large concentrations after Wagram influenced the character of later battles, including Borodino, Bautzen, and Leipzig.

The French expression feu d'enfer (literally "hellfire") can describe exceptionally violent or intense fire, but it is better understood as a descriptive expression rather than the formal name of the Napoleonic doctrine of massing artillery. The Dictionnaire de l'Académie française defines un feu d'enfer as a very great or very violent fire; contemporary military usage could similarly apply the phrase to exceptionally heavy battlefield fire. Thus, grande batterie refers to the physical concentration of guns, concentration des feux to the concentration of their effects on a selected objective, and feu d'enfer to the intensity of fire rather than a distinct tactical formation or doctrine.

== American Civil War applies Napoleon's tactics and uses his French terms ==
The influence of Napoleonic military thought continued into the American Civil War. Many of the professional officers who held senior commands on both sides had been educated at the United States Military Academy, where Dennis Hart Mahan taught military theory and where the writings and principles of Antoine-Henri Jomini, who had served in the Napoleonic Wars, strongly influenced antebellum military instruction. The continued currency of French and Napoleonic terminology is illustrated by Confederate officer G. Moxley Sorrel, James Longstreet's chief of staff. Recalling the preparations for Pickett's Charge at the Battle of Gettysburg on 3 July 1863, Sorrel wrote that an artillery "feu d'enfer" was to precede the infantry attack under the direction of E. P. Alexander, who was to signal when the bombardment had made its greatest impression. Sorrel's wording provides a direct example of a Civil War staff officer using the French expression feu d'enfer when describing a concentrated artillery preparation immediately preceding a major infantry assault.
