= Rearguard =

Military unit or personnel that protects the rear of the main force

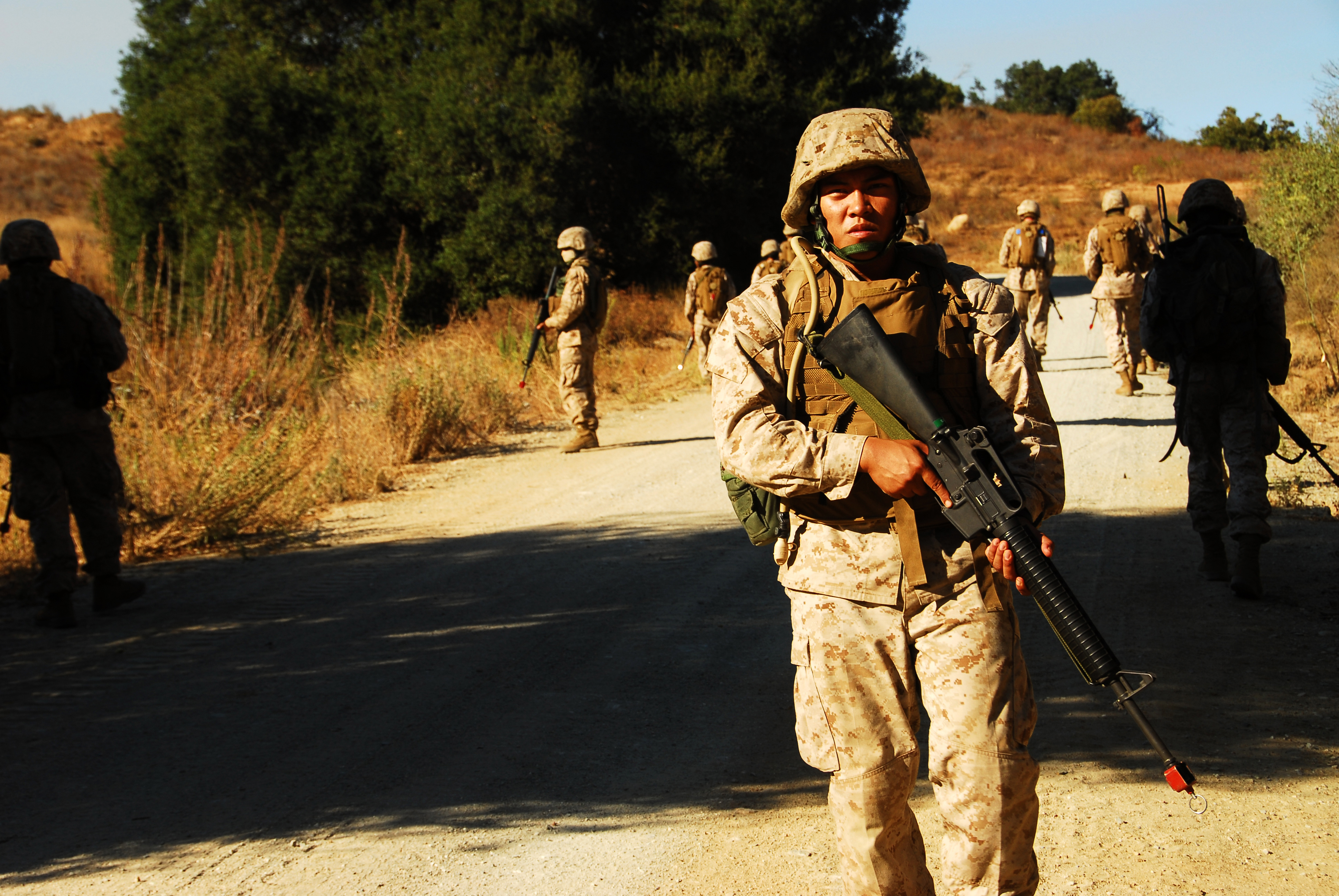
A United States Marine providing rear security to his unit during a simulated patrol in 2009

A rearguard or rear security is a part of a military force that protects it from attack from the rear, either during an advance or withdrawal. The term can also be used to describe forces protecting lines, such as communication lines, behind an army. Even more generally, a rearguard action may refer idiomatically to an attempt at preventing something though it is likely too late to be prevented; this idiomatic meaning may apply in either a military or non-military context.

== Origins ==
The term rearguard (also rereward, rearward) comes from the Old French reregarde, i.e. "the guard which is behind", originating with the medieval custom of dividing an army into three battles or wards; Van, Main (or Middle) and Rear. The Rear Ward usually followed the other wards on the march and during a battle usually formed the rearmost of the three if deployed in column or the left-hand ward if deployed in line.

== Original usage ==
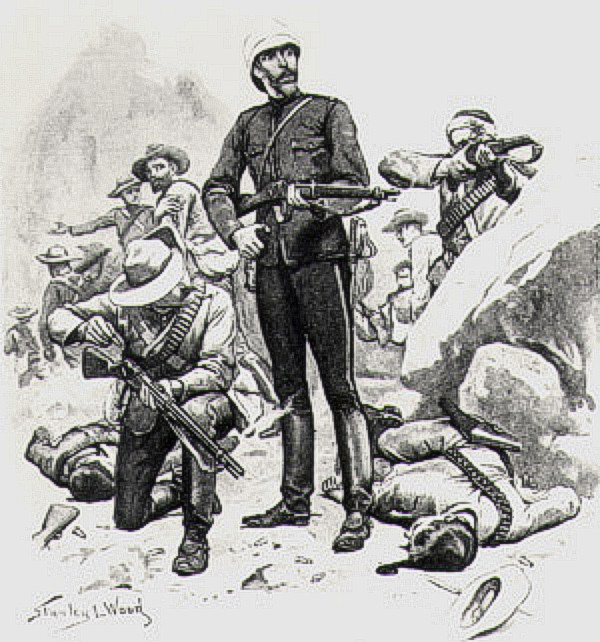
An illustration of British Army Colonel Redvers Buller's rearguard action during Battle of Hlobane of the Anglo-Zulu War

The commonly accepted definition of a rearguard in military tactics was largely established in the battles of the late 19th century. Before the mechanization of troop formations, most rearguard tactics originally contemplated the use of cavalry forces. This definition was later extended to highly mobile infantry as well as mechanized or armored forces.

Narrowly defined, a rearguard is a covering detachment that protects the retreating main ground force element (main body), or column, and is charged with executing defensive or retrograde movements between the main body and the enemy to prevent the latter from attacking or interfering with the movement of the main body.

== Contemporary usage ==
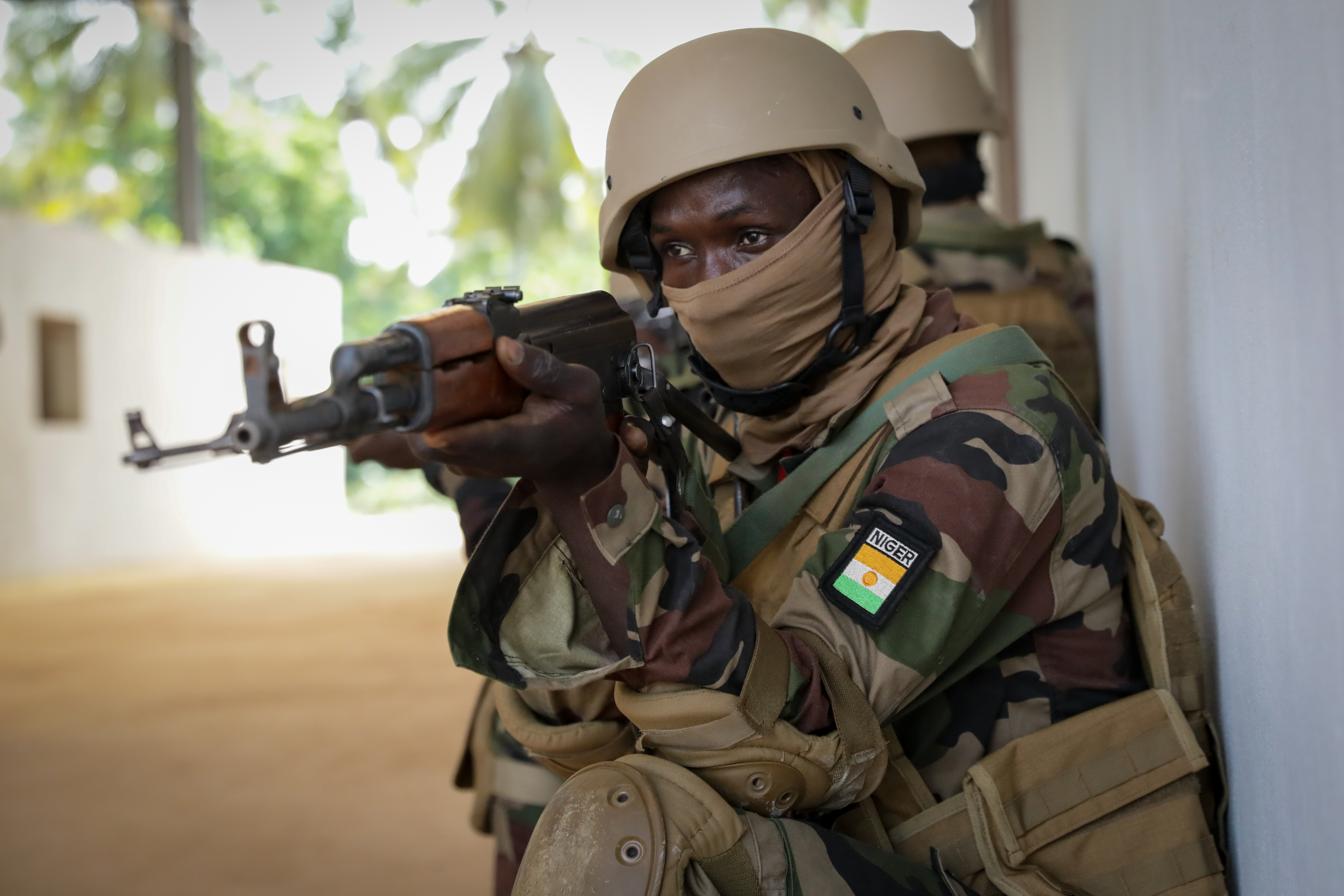
A Niger Armed Forces soldier providing rear security during close-quarters combat training in 2022

A more expansive definition of the rearguard arose during the large-scale struggles between nation-states during World War I and World War II. In this context, a rearguard can be a minor unit of regular or irregular troops that protect the withdrawal of larger numbers of personnel (military or civilian) during a retreat, by blocking, defending, delaying, or otherwise interfering with enemy forces in order to gain time for the remainder to regroup or reorganize. Rearguard actions may be undertaken in a number of ways: defensively, such as by defending strongpoints or tactically important terrain; or offensively, by pre-emptively assaulting with a spoiling attack an enemy that is preparing offensive operations.

Three examples of rearguard actions are:

- Rorke's Drift during the Zulu War (1879)
- Battle of Tirad Pass (1899)
- Battle of Dunkirk (1940)

A World War I-era example is the rearguard action fought by small units of the Serbian Army to protect retreating Serbian troops, the royal family, and Serbian refugees from advancing forces of the Central Powers during their retreat through Albania and Montenegro in 1915–1916. The nature of combat in rearguard actions involving combat between armies of nation-states is typically desperate and vicious, and rearguard troops may be called upon to incur heavy casualties or even to sacrifice all of their combat strength and personnel for the benefit of the withdrawing forces.

=== Idiomatic expression ===
Fighting or mounting a rearguard action is also sometimes an idiomatic expression, outside any military context. That idiom refers to trying very hard to prevent a thing from happening even though it is probably too late. Sportswriters employ the idiom as well.

== See also ==
- Quick reaction force
- Second line
- Vanguard
