= Lochos =

Tactical subunit of the ancient and modern Greek armies

A lochos, plural lochoi (Ancient Greek: λόχος, romanized: lokhos; pl. λόχοι, lokhoi), is a tactical sub unit of Classical Greece and of the modern Greek army. The term derived from the ancient Greek for ambush and the men carrying out the ambush, but in practice, its meaning was essentially that of "war-band", a body of armed men. This translation has been used traditionally, e.g. for the Sacred Band of Thebes.

== Size and organisation ==
Evolving as it did with ancient Greek warfare from that of tribal Greece to that of the Greek city-states, the lochos varied in size and organisation over time and from city state to city state, ranging in size from a single file to about 640 men. The best surviving description of the lochos is that by Xenophon in his Anabasis, however this must be taken as being illustrative of a particular time and place, that of 5th century BC Sparta, rather than being truly representative. Aelian and Arrian use the terms lochos as file and lochagos as file leader.

=== Lochos as file ===
A lochos comprised an inconsistent number of men that could range from 8 to 16 men. Asclepiodotus offers three alternative names, namely stichos (στίχος), synomotia (συνωμοτία) and dekania (δεκανία). The file leader was called a lochagos and the file closer an ouragos. The men in the uneven rows were called protostates, among which the lochagos, and the men in the even rows epistates. Should the line perform a pyknosis (that is, close its ranks by placement of half the lochos in the interval between the original lochoi), then the epistates of the lochagos would become the promachos protostates of the newly employed file.

A half-file was called hemilochion (ἡμιλόχιον) or dimoiria (διμοιρία) and a quarter-file enomotia (ἐνωμοτία).

=== Spartan lochos ===
The Spartan lochos, according to Xenophon, consisted of 640 men, composed of 4 pentekostyes (pl. of pentekostys) of 160 men, with the pentekostyes in turn being composed of 4 enomotiai of about 40 men each. The lochos in turn formed half of a mora, there being 6 morai in the Spartan Army. The morai would normally be commanded by a Polemarch, and the lochos by a lochagos. However, the actual numbers would vary depending on the needs of a campaign. Spartan military organisation relied on dividing its citizen army into eight age classes and a full strength enomotiai consisted of five men from each of the age classes. However, it was unusual to draw men from the older age classes, so, on campaign, an enomotia would consist of 30 to 35 men with the lokhos and mora being correspondingly smaller. If only the first four, or even fewer, age classes were called up, then the "short" organisational lochos would be grouped together to form a full strength tactical lochos.

Whatever the theoretical size of the lochos, units of about 300 men appear frequently in the classical Greek records, this being the number of the Sacred Band of Thebes, the Spartans at Thermopylae, and the number on each side of the Battle of the Champions fought between Argos and Sparta in 546 BC. This number would give a frontage of about 40 shields given the traditional eight-deep phalanx, and probably represents the smallest number needed to form a usable phalanx.

== Byzantine use ==
In the Byzantine army, the lochos was used as a term for a section-sized military unit, while contubernium designated the files of a tagma. According to the Sylloge Tacticorum, written in the 10th century, it was a formation of 16 men led by a lochagos. Subordinate to the lochagos was the decurion, who commanded a squad of 10 men; the pentarch, who commanded four other men; and the tetrarch, who commanded three.

== Modern use ==
The term lochos, along with the associated rank of lochagos and its derivatives, has been revived in the modern Greek military for a company-sized command.

== See also ==
- Cohort, a Roman military unit of about the same size as a large lochos
- Sacred Band (disambiguation) for a number of units named Ieros Lochos in Greek history
- Tagma (military)
