= Hollow square =

Hollow square has multiple meanings:

- Infantry square, an old infantry formation
- Hollow square (room layout), a conference hall layout
