= Quarter guard =

Ceremonial guard troop

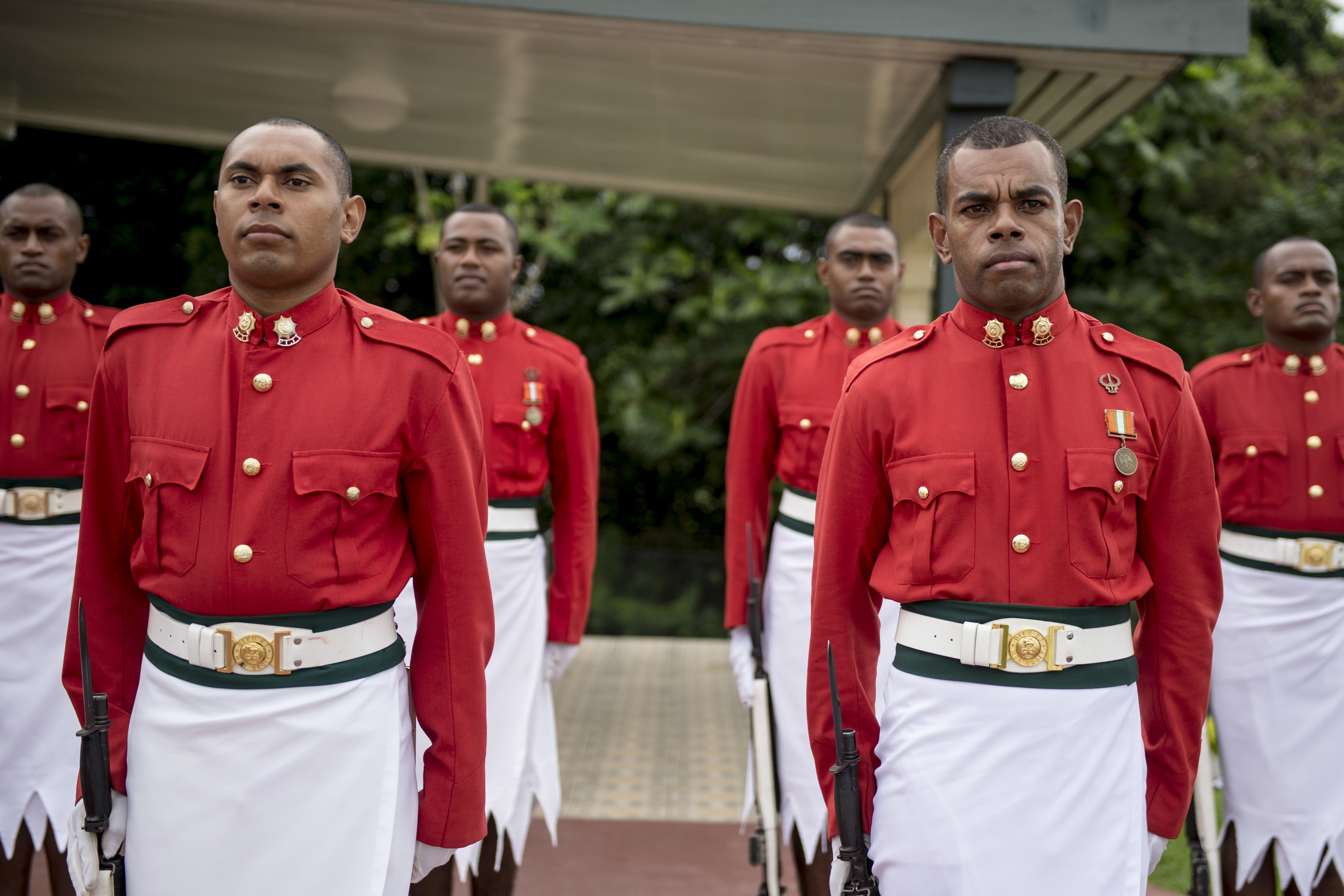
Members of the Republic of Fiji Military Forces Quarter Guard.

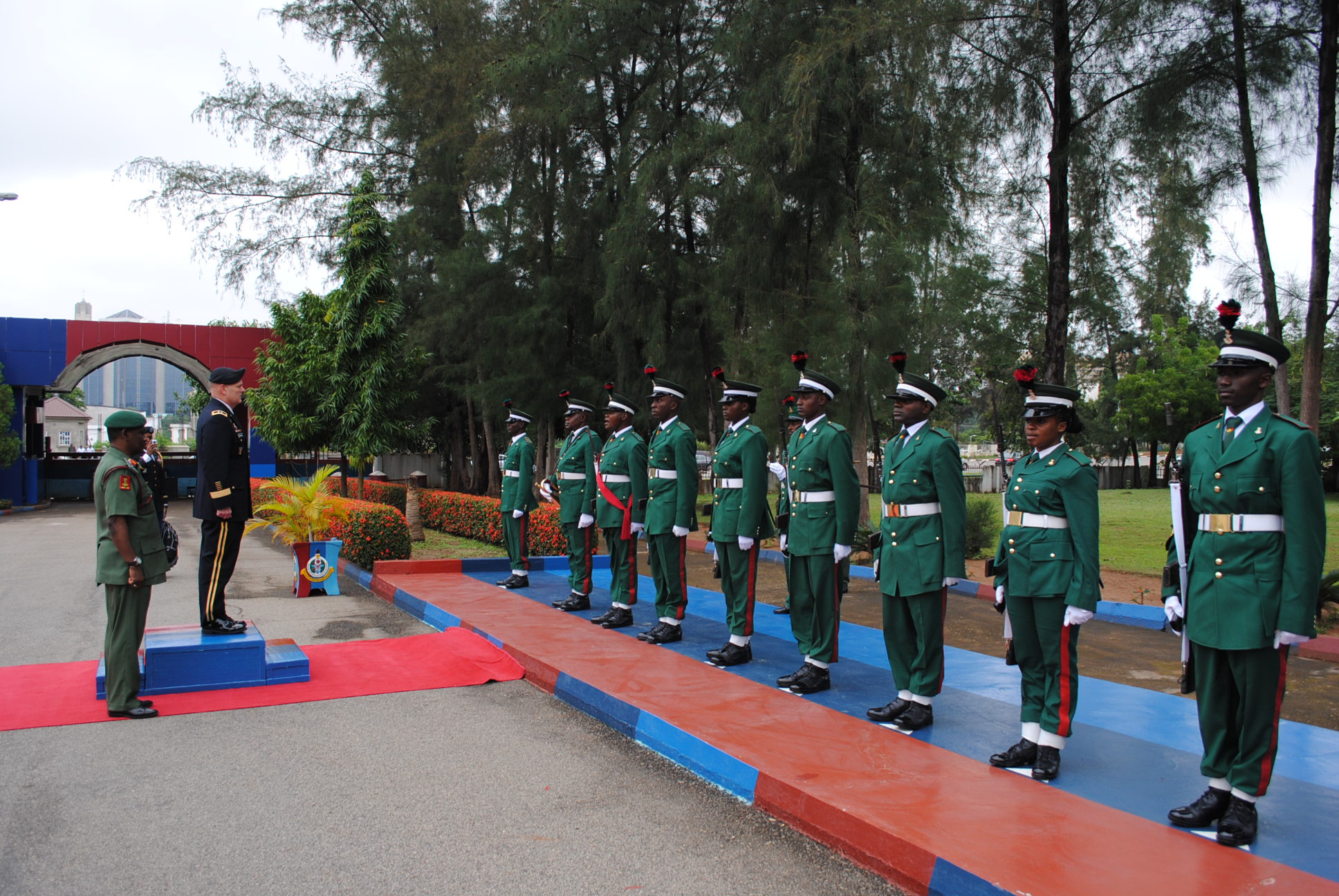
The Quarter Guard of the Nigerian Army at the Command and Staff College, Jaji, Kaduna

The quarter guard is a small detachment of troops that can be used as a ceremonial guard which may be mounted at the entrance of a military unit to pay compliments as required. A quarter guard is to consist of one non-commissioned officer and six or eight other ranks formed up in two ranks. It is technically a minuscule guard of honour.

== Indian Army ==
In the Indian Army, the quarter guard is the main point of security arrangements for the army camp/garrison Regimental depot. The regimental colours, the armoury and the treasury would be kept in this building. In addition to this, the quarter guard also has a lock-up often in the guardhouse to hold soldiers charged with minor crimes (absent without leave, drunkenness being among the usual crimes).

The standard guard strength is 6 guards, 1 guard 2/ic (2nd in command - usually a Naik or Lance Naik) and a guard commander (usually a Havildar). Additionally, in some units, a bugler would also be present for calling the various duty calls etc. At the time of emergencies/threats, the strength of the guard would be increased.

The Armoury is a part of the Quarter Guard. A Quarter Guard is a place of pride for the Army Unit and the guards detailed on duty there are always in ceremonials. A visiting dignitary invariably visits the Quarter Guard. A Quarter Guard is expected to reflect the high standards of the unit. It has some relation with the number of troops in presidential guard.

== Border Security Force(BSF) ==
In Indian Border Security Force battalions, like the Indian Army, the quarter is a special place where along with armory and treasury there subsist a guardhouse lockup where defaulting border troopers, accused of petty indiscipline cases like intoxication, AWOL, are kept under force custody. It also has a chime that is called for important regimental functions in the Battalion.

The guard consist of total 8 troopers including one guard commander and one guard second-in-command in addition to a battalion Bugler. The quarter guard reflects the moral and motivation of the battalion, hence it's a well maintained and revered place in a BSF battalion. Battalion Adjutants are responsible for the overall upkeep and regular change of guard at the quarter guard.
