= Mixed Order =

Former French military formation

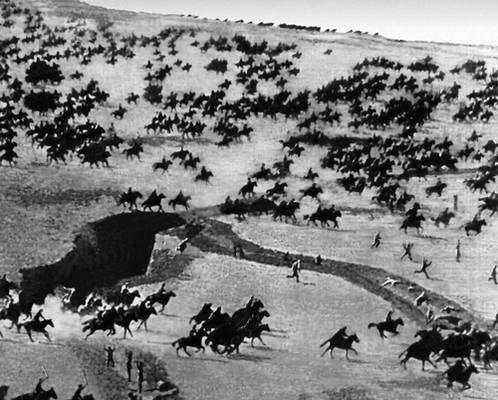
"Red cavalry on the attack", Russian Civil War, 1919

The Mixed Order (French: Ordre Mixte) was a tactical formation originally used by demi-brigades of the French Revolutionary Army and then later by Napoleon's Grande Armée to great effect.

First proposed by the French theorist Comte de Guibert, the Mixed Order could be adapted to be used by companies or battalions and involved two or more of these units using a combination of Line and Column formations. Its origins were in the revolutionary wars where massed French militias lacked the training and experience to complete complicated manoeuvres and by necessity adopted a mixed order of veteran trained units and newly recruited/conscripted units. The regular troops moved in line, along with the recruits moving in column, which required far less training to perfect, whether on the flanks, the centre or the rear of the veteran units.

The column formation allowed for rapid movement and a very effective charge (due to weight of numbers), and could quickly be formed into an infantry square to resist cavalry attacks. However, by its nature only a fraction of its muskets would be able to open fire. The line offered a substantially larger musket frontage allowing for greater shooting capability but required extensive training to allow the unit to move over ground as one while retaining the line.

The mixed order remained a part of French tactical doctrine as the French army grew in discipline, capitalising as it did on the strengths of both the line and column formations, while avoiding some of their inherent weaknesses. It was used extensively by Napoleon when commanding the Grande Armée.

== List of key battles it was used in ==
- Tagliamento (1797)
- Marengo (1799)
- Austerlitz (1805)
- Jena (1806)
- Borodino (1812)

== See also ==
- Column (formation)
- Flying wedge
- Svinfylking
