= Protostates =

Position in Ancient Greek infantry

A protostates (Greek: πρωτοστάτης, lit. 'the one who stands first/in front'), in Ancient Greece, was the man in front of an epistates (the one who stands behind). The Greek phalanx was made up of alternate ranks of protostates and epistates. Thus, in a file of eight men, the protostates were the men in positions 1, 3, 5 and 7, while the epistates occupied positions 2, 4, 6 and 8. The term remained in use into the Byzantine Empire. The foremost protostates of a file (lochos) was called a lochagos (λοχαγός).
