= File (formation) =

Military unit of troops aligned one behind the other

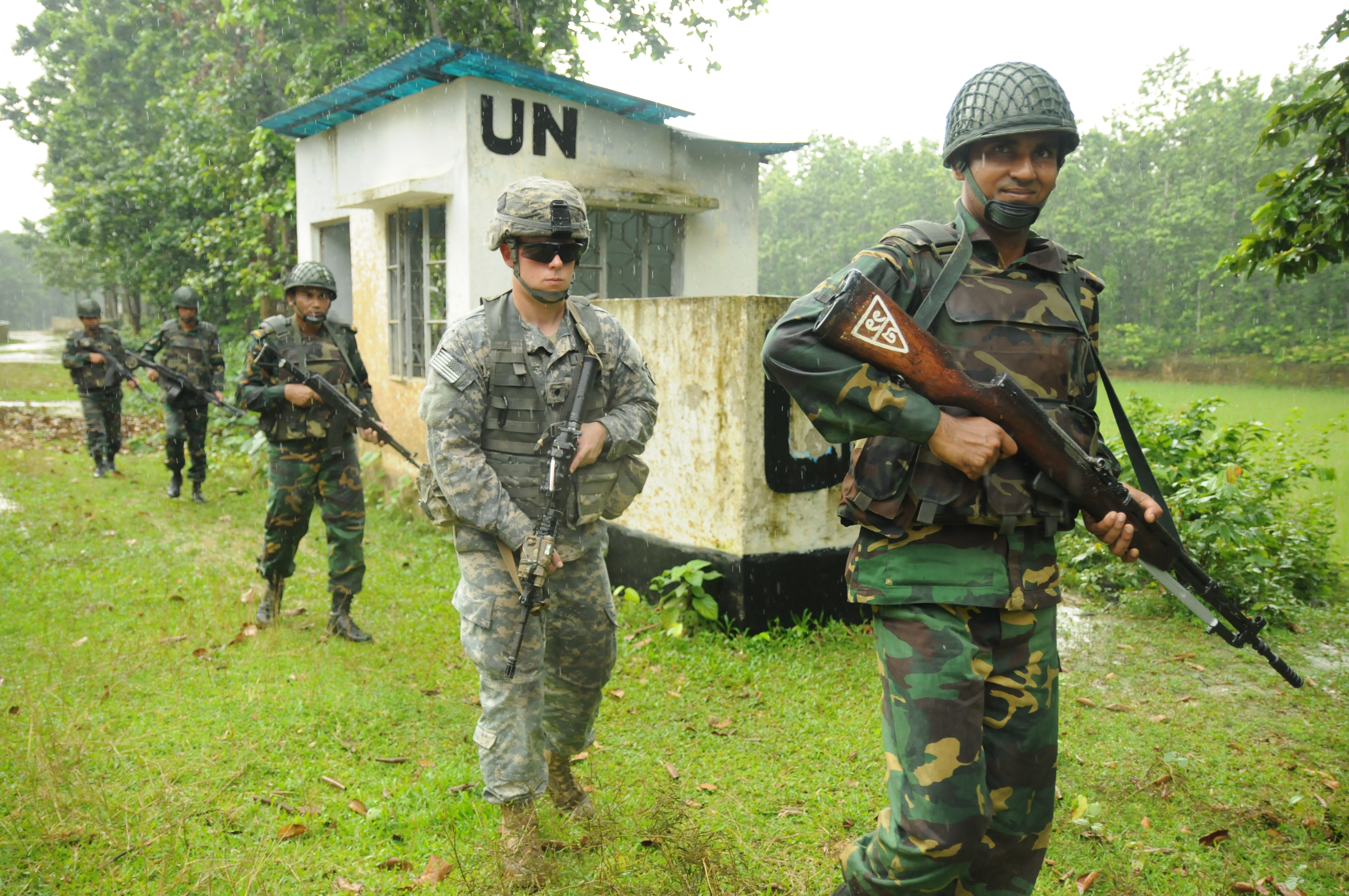
Troops from the U.S. and Bangladesh march in single file during a tactical training exercise in 2014.

In military organization, a file is a number of troops drawn up in line ahead (i.e. one behind the other) in a column. The number of files is the measure of the width of a column of troops in several ranks one behind the other.

== Usage ==
Files are useful when troops don't know where the enemy is, since there are overlapping fields of fire from each soldier, and cover from a possible flanking attack. Files are at a disadvantage when there are heavy weapons nearby, supported by infantry, especially machine guns and tanks.

== Ancient Greek use ==
A file of men in the Greek phalanx was called a lochos (Greek: λόχος) and usually ranged from eight to sixteen men.
