= Infantry square =

Combat formation of infantry

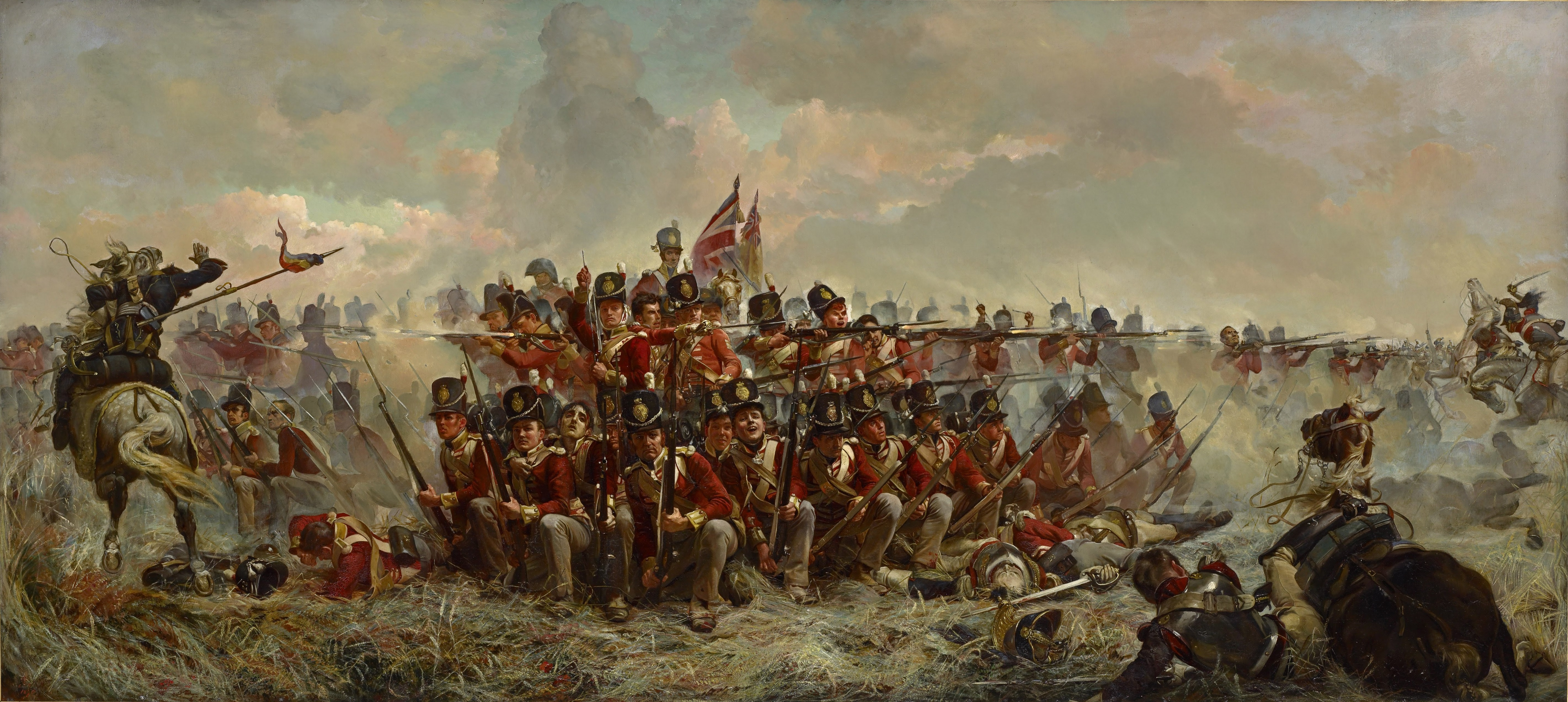
1875 painting of a British infantry square at the 1815 Battle of Quatre Bras by Elizabeth Thompson

An infantry square, also known as a hollow square or square formation, was a musket-era historic close order formation used in combat by infantry units, usually when threatened with cavalry attack. To deploy its weapons effectively, a traditional infantry unit would generally form a line; but the line was vulnerable to more nimble cavalry, which could sweep around the end of the line, or burst through it, and then attack the undefended rear or simply sweep along the line attacking the individual footsoldiers successively. By arranging the unit so that there was no undefended rear or flank, an infantry commander could organise an effective defense against cavalry attack. With both the development of modern repeating firearms and the demise of cavalry in warfare, the square formation is considered obsolete and is effectively never used in modern day warfare.

== Early history ==
The formation was described by Plutarch and used by the Ancient Romans; it was developed from an earlier circular formation. In particular, a large infantry square was used by the Roman legions at the Battle of Carrhae against Parthia, whose armies contained a large proportion of cavalry. That is not to be confused with the testudo formation, which also resembled a square, but was used for protection against ranged weapons such as arrows and javelins.

The Han dynasty's mounted infantry forces used tactics effectively that involved highly mobile infantry square formations in conjunction with light cavalry in their many engagements against the primarily cavalry Xiongnu nomad armies in the 1st century AD. Infantry squares were used in the siege of the nomads' mountain settlements near the Gobi region, where Han forces repelled nomad lancer attacks.

The Byzantine Empire in the 9th to the 11th centuries used highly sophisticated combined arms tactics, based around hollow infantry square formation. The infantry square, consisting of pikemen and archers, acted as a base of operations and refuge for cavalry by forming what was essentially a mobile fortified camp. Cavalry would ride out of the square through gaps in lines to exploit opportunities for attack and retreat the same way if the situation turned against it. The infantry square described by Nikephoros Phokas consisted of 12,000 men, who were deployed in 1000-man taxiarchies, which were separated by intervals wide enough to admit a dozen cavalrymen riding abreast to enter or leave the square.

The square was revived in the 14th century as the schiltron. It later appeared as the pike square or tercio during the Thirty Years War, the Eighty Years War and was widely used as well in the French Revolutionary Wars and the Napoleonic Wars.

The Mysorean forces of Hyder Ali employed a square formation of four infantry divisions on 6 March 1771, while retreating during the Maratha–Mysore wars. The square proceeded for several miles, engaging in an artillery battle with the Marathas. A Maratha cannon struck a tumbrel, which exploded, reacted with some Mysorean rockets, one of them then fired and hit an ammunition box, causing an explosion. This led to the left division fleeing and disorganised the square, which was broken by cavalry charges. During Tipu Sultan's wars with the Marathas, his infantry marched in four columns, surrounding the baggage and cavalry in the centre. While camped, the infantry and artillery faced outwards in square.

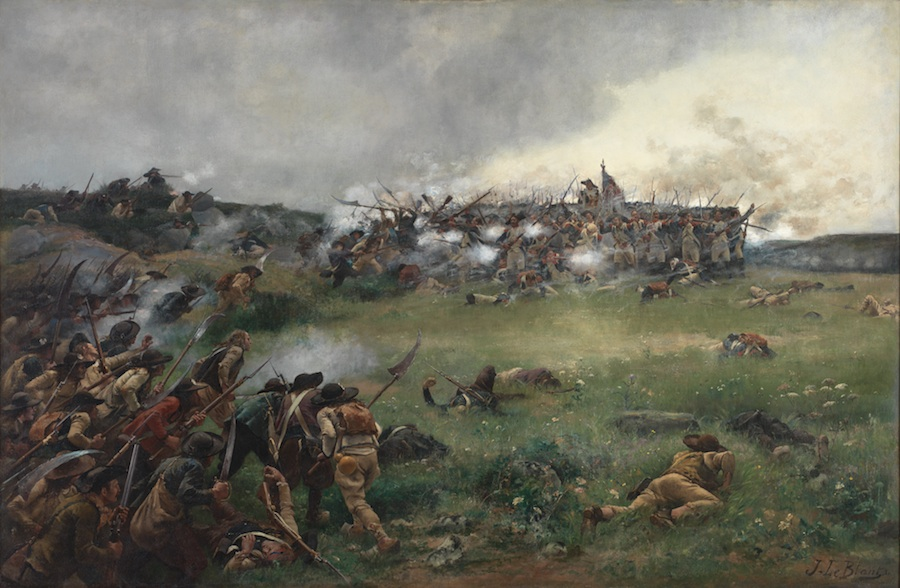
Infantry of the French Revolutionary Army in square formation, under attack by Chouan rebels at the Battle of Rocher de La Piochais, 21 December 1795.

== Forming a square ==
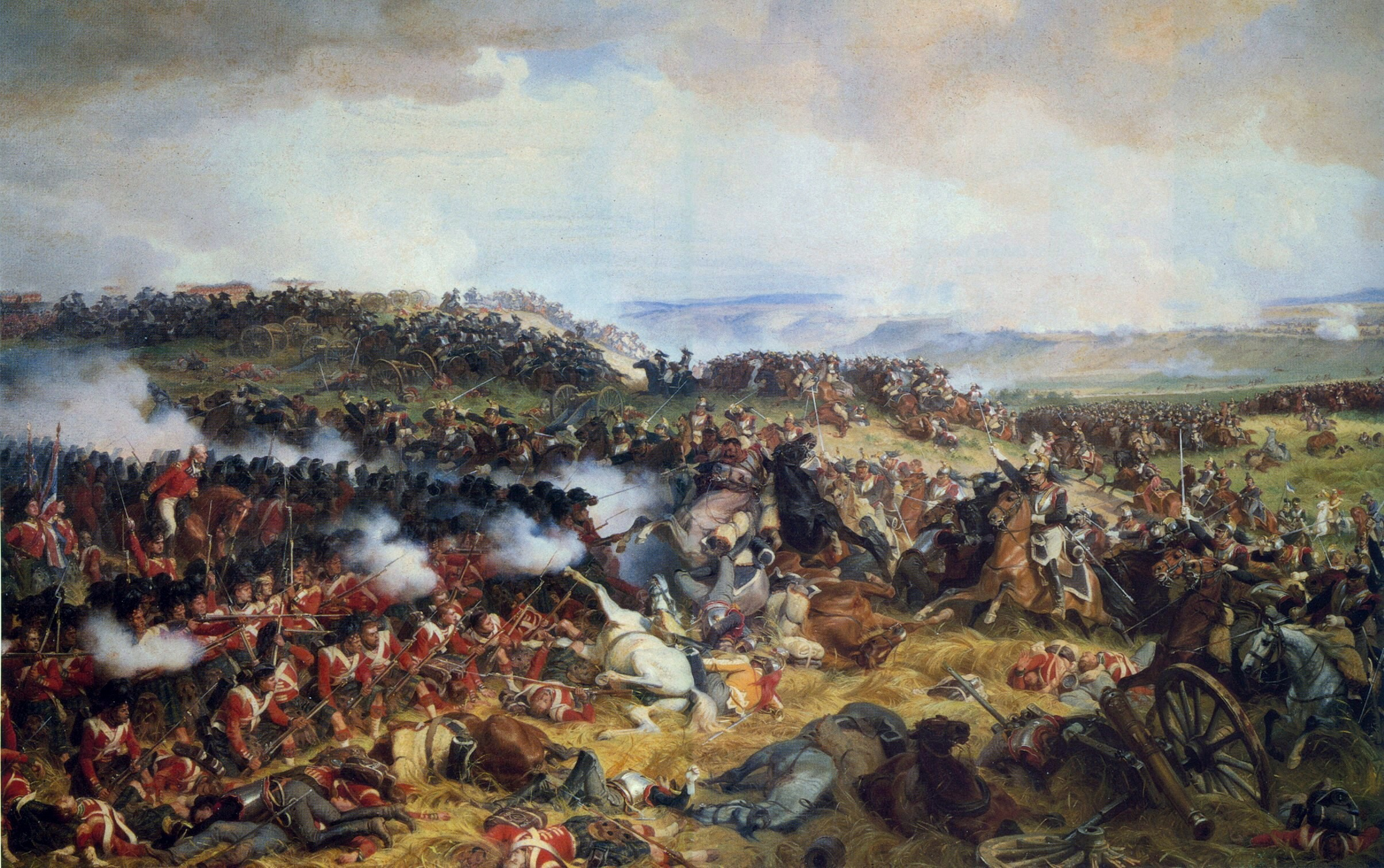
The charge of the French Cuirassiers at the Battle of Waterloo against a British square.

As used in the Napoleonic Wars, the formation was constituted as a hollow square or sometimes a rectangle, with each side composed of two or more ranks of soldiers armed with single-shot muskets or rifles with fixed bayonets. Generally, a battalion, with about 500 to 1,000 men, was the smallest unit forming a square. Its colours and commander were positioned in the centre, along with a reserve force to reinforce any side of the square that was weakened by attacks. A square of 500 men in four ranks, such as those formed by Wellington's army at the Battle of Waterloo, was a tight formation less than 20 m long on any side. Squares would be arranged in a checkerboard formation to minimise the risk of soldiers from one square accidentally shooting another. A tight checkerboard, with minimal gaps between the corners of adjacent squares, was effective in defence, minimising opposing cavalry's freedom of movement and allowing for some mutual support at the corners – the weakest points. But if redeployed in line to attack, the neighboring units would overlap and thus obstruct one another's line of advance and field of fire.

Once formed in square, the infantry would volley fire at approaching cavalry, either by file or by rank. In successful actions, the infantry would often withhold the volley until the charging horses and men were about 30 m from the square; the resulting casualties to the attackers would eventually form piles of dead and wounded horses and their riders, which would obstruct further attacks.

Undisciplined or early fire by the infantry would be ineffective against the attacking cavalry and leave the foot soldiers with empty muskets. The cavalrymen could then approach to very short range while the infantry was reloading, where they could fire at the infantry with their pistols, slash at them with sabres or stab them with lances, if they were so equipped.

Firing too late, with cavalry within 20 m, although more effective in hitting the targets, could result in a fatally wounded horse tumbling into the infantry ranks and creating a gap, thus permitting the surviving horsemen to enter the square and break it up from within.

It was vital for squares to stand firm in the face of a charge, but they were not static formations. In suitable terrain astute commanders could manoeuvre squares to mass fire and even trap cavalry, as the French managed against the Ottomans at the Battle of Mount Tabor (1799).

At the Battle of Waterloo (1815) the four-rank squares of the Allied forces withstood eleven cavalry charges. At Waterloo the attacking cavalry were not supported, whether by horse artillery or infantry, but at the Battle of Lützen (1813), even with infantry and light artillery support, Allied cavalry charges failed to break green French troops. Similarly, impressive infantry efforts were seen at the Battle of Jena-Auerstedt (1806), the Battle of Pultusk (1806), the Battle of Fuentes de Oñoro (1811) and the First Battle of Krasnoi (August 14, 1812). If a square was broken, as happened at the Battle of Medina de Rioseco (1808), the infantry could suffer many casualties although brave and well-disciplined infantry could recover even from such a disaster.

== Breaking a square ==
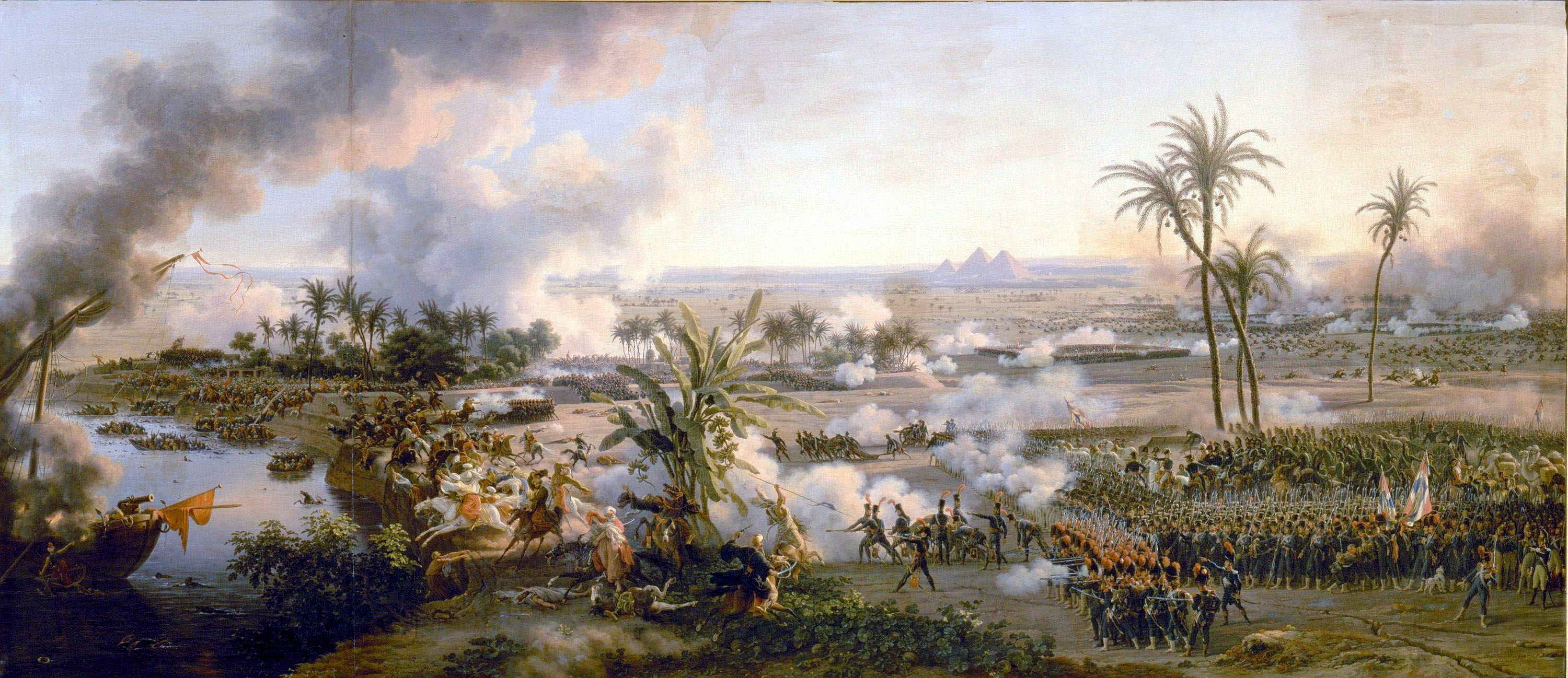
Egyptian Mamluk cavalry charges a French infantry square during the Battle of the Pyramids, 1798.

Attacking cavalry would attempt to "break a square" by causing it to lose its cohesion, either by charging to induce poorly disciplined infantry to flee before contact was made or by causing casualties through close-range combat (see above).

Cavalry charges were made in closely packed formations, and were often aimed at the corners of the square, the weakest points of the formation. Feints and false attacks would also be used to make the infantry "throw away their fire" by causing them to fire too early. However, if the infantrymen were well-disciplined and held their ground, the cavalryman's dream to "ride a square into red ruin" would not be realized, but such an event was the exception, rather than the rule, in the history of warfare.

The most effective way to break a square was not direct cavalry attack but the use of artillery, particularly firing canister shot, which could massacre the tightly packed infantry of the square. To be truly effective, such artillery fire had to be delivered at close range. A 20 m wide infantry square was a small and difficult target for field artillery firing from within or just in front of its own army's lines, typically at least 600 m away, a range at which most rounds could then be expected to miss. Thus, attackers would usually try to deploy horse artillery accompanying the cavalry. The presence of the cavalry would cause the infantry to form square, but the closely packed infantrymen would then become targets for the artillery since the cohesion of the square would break under their fire, making it much easier for the cavalry to press home the attack.

Combined attacks by infantry and cavalry would also have the same effect; the defending infantry unit would be placed in the difficult position of either forming square and being shot to pieces by the attacking infantry, which would usually be in line formation, or being ridden down by the cavalry if it decided to remain in line and trade volleys with the attacking infantry.

In addition, if the cavalry could catch an infantry unit before it formed square properly, the horsemen could usually inflict severe casualties or even destroy the unit completely. The Battle of Quatre Bras (1815) saw several examples, with several British units being surprised at close range by French cavalry hidden by the terrain. Other circumstances that could lead to a successful cavalry attack included sudden rainstorms soaking the infantry's gunpowder, effectively reducing their weapons to very short pikes, or a mortally wounded horse in full gallop crashing into the square, opening a gap that could be exploited, as happened at the Battle of Garcia Hernandez, shortly after the Battle of Salamanca (1812).

== Later use ==
The square continued in use into the late 19th century by European armies against irregular warriors in colonial actions, but it was different in form from the Napoleonic formation:

The new square was not simply infantry in static defence but a large, close-packed formation of some 1,000 to 1,500 men, capable of slow movement with ranks of infantry or cavalry forming the four sides and artillery, wheeled machine guns, transport carts, baggage animals and their handlers in the centre. Such a square could only survive where the enemy were without modern firearms.

At the Battle of Custoza (1866), during the Third Italian War of Independence, Italian bersaglieri formed squares at Villafranca to defend themselves from charging Austrian uhlans.

=== European colonial use ===
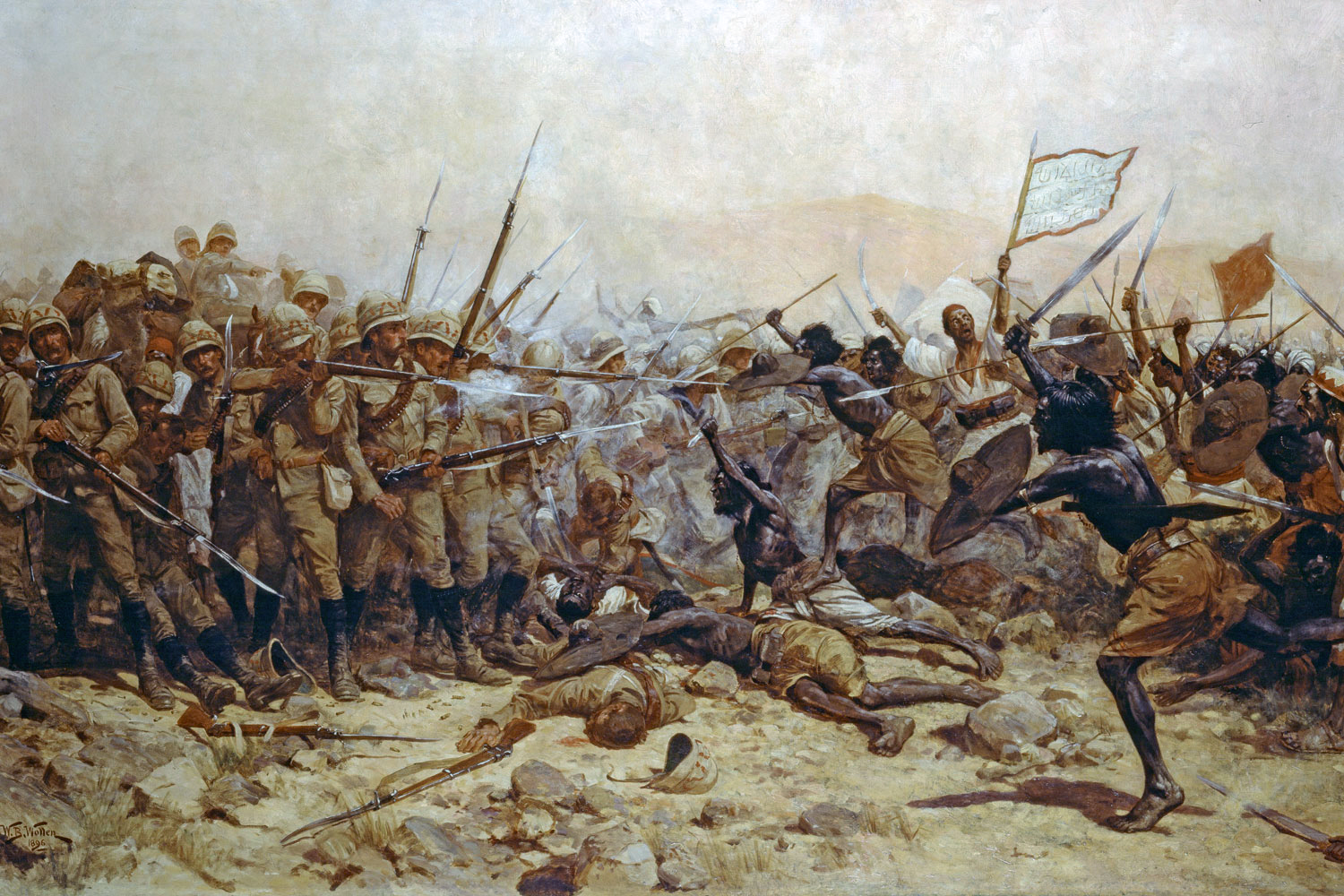
A depiction of the British square at the Battle of Abu Klea, during the Mahdist War in the late 19th century.

The British infantry used square formations several times during the wars in India and Burma. During the Battle of Ramu on 16 May 1824, British Indian infantry had tried to form square against attacking Burmese cavalry but were overwhelmed as the sepoys became tangled up as they were on the move from a fighting retreat against infantry earlier. The square was incomplete when the Burmese horsemen rode in and the slaughter of the sepoys led the entire unit to be routed. Square formations in the Yangon Campaign in Lower Burma were generally more successful.

On 7 February 1857, during the Anglo-Persian War, Indian cavalry successfully attacked and broke a Persian square in the Battle of Khushab. Only 20 of the 500 soldiers in the square escaped.

During the Anglo-Zulu War, after the Battle of Isandlwana in which Zulu warriors overwhelmed the British expeditionary force's poorly fortified linear formation positioning, infantry squares were used in most major battles such as the Battle of Gingindlovu and the climactic Battle of Ulundi to counter their enemy's massed charges.

Rudyard Kipling's poem "Fuzzy-Wuzzy" refers to two battles in the Mahdist War, Tamai in 1884 and Abu Klea in 1885, in which infantry squares were used by the British expeditionary force. In both battles the squares were partially broken, but British losses remained very low in comparison with the losses of the attacking Mahdists, who were largely armed with spears and swords.

In 1936, during the Second Italo-Ethiopian War, the advancing Italians formed an infantry square to defend against a possible Ethiopian counterattack in the Battle of Shire, although no counterattack was ever launched.

=== Use in the Americas ===
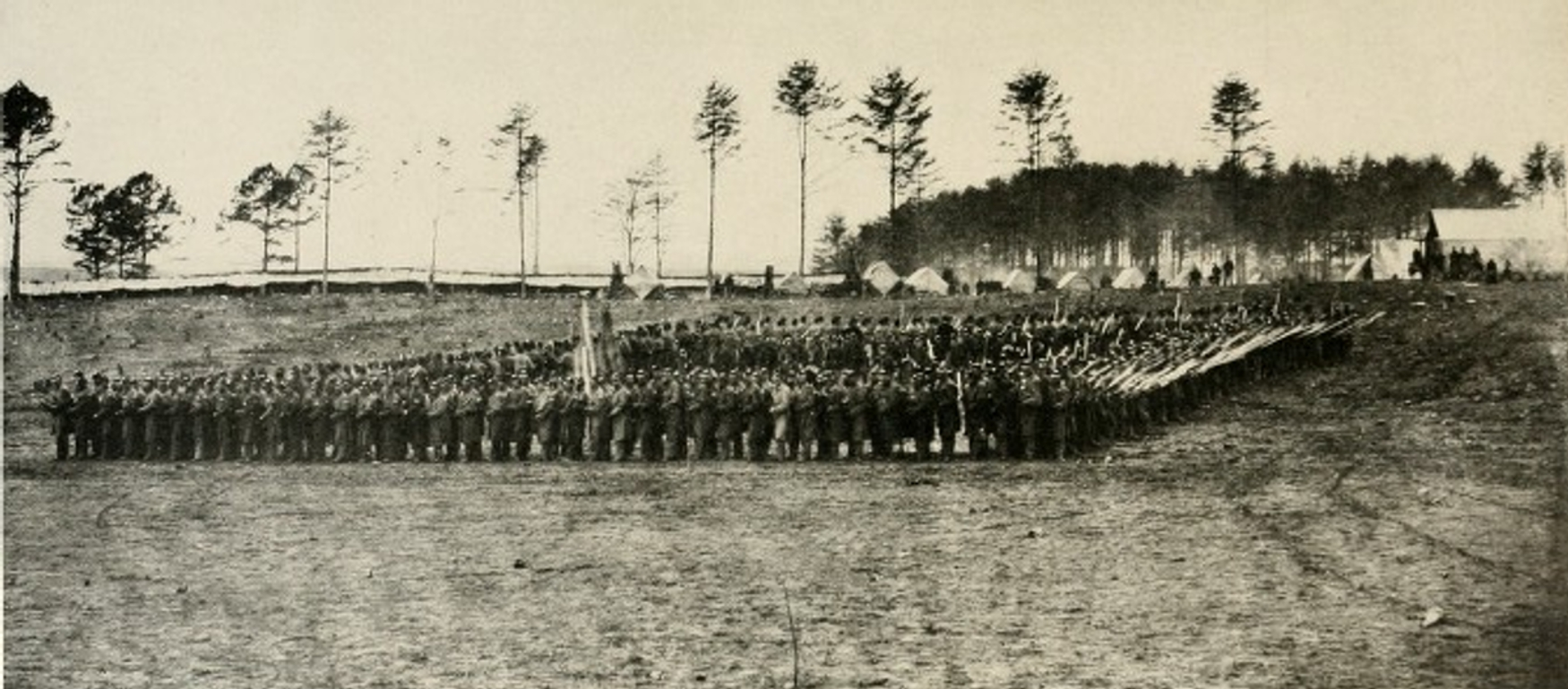
Union Infantry during the American Civil War form in an infantry square with bayonets fixed, 1860s.

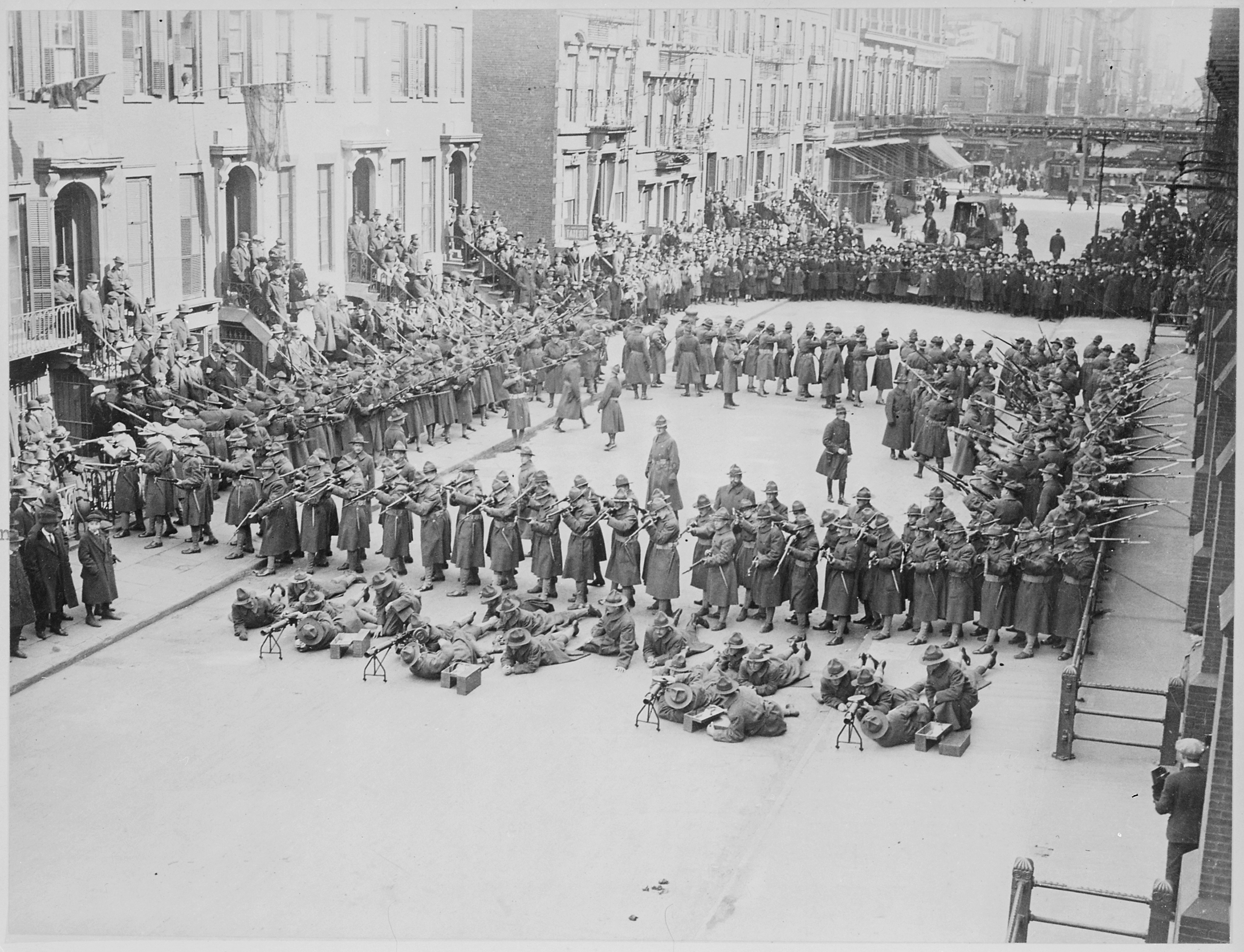
A battalion of the US Army Coast Artillery Corps demonstrating the hollow square formation used in the event of a street riot, 1918.

On March 19, 1836, while on the retreat from Goliad after the fall of the Alamo, Texan Colonel James Fannin and his command of 300 men were intercepted by over 1,200 Mexican troops. The Texans formed square and repulsed three successive Mexican charges but surrendered the following day when their supplies ran low.

During the American Civil War, the infantry square was used on only a few occasions, the most notable of which was the Thirty-Second Indiana Volunteer Infantry at the Battle of Rowlett's Station, December 17, 1861, against Terry's Texas Rangers. A Colorado Volunteer company formed square when it was charged by lancers of the 5th Texas Mounted Rifles at the Battle of Valverde on February 21, 1862.

On other occasions, such as at Gettysburg and the Battle of Chickamauga, cavalry units feinted as if they were preparing to charge to force the advancing infantry to halt their advance and form a square.

In 1867, one of the first battles of the 10th Cavalry was the Battle of the Saline River, 25 miles northwest of Fort Hays, Kansas, in late August 1867. Captain George Armes, Company F, 10th Cavalry, was following the trail of a party of Cheyenne who had killed a group of Union Pacific Railway surveyors. Tracking along the Saline River, he was surrounded by about 400 horse-mounted Cheyenne warriors. Armes formed a defensive "hollow square" with the cavalry mounts in the middle. Seeking a better defensive position, Armes walked his command while he maintained the defensive square. After 8 hours of combat, 2,000 rounds of defensive fire, and 15 miles of movement, the Cheyenne disengaged and withdrew. Company F, without reinforcements, concluded 113 miles of movement during the 30-hour patrol and rode the final 10 miles back to Fort Hays with only one trooper killed in action. Armes later commented, "It is the greatest wonder in the world that my command escaped being massacred." Armes credited his officers for a "devotion to duty and coolness under fire."

In 1869, during the Paraguayan War in South America, the Paraguayan defenders formed a square towards the end of the Battle of Acosta Ñu. The square was formed too late and so was broken by the Brazilian cavalry.

=== Use in Asia ===
At the Battle of Nahrin in 1863, several thousand Afghan troops led by 'Abd al-Rahman Khan annihilated a 40,000 strong Qataghani army through the use of the infantry square, which they adopted from Britain. 10,000 Qataghani troops were killed or wounded, while only a mere 21 Afghans were killed and 10 wounded.

=== End of the Infantry Square ===
The square fell out of use in the late 19th century with the advent of modern repeating firearms, which made concentrated formations risky in the face of increased firepower, along with the parallel decline of horse cavalry.

== See also ==
- Column of companies a contemporary infantry formation used when on the march to protect against possible cavalry attack.
