= Epistates =

Ancient Greek term for an overseer or superintendent

An epistates (Greek: ἐπιστάτης; plural ἐπιστάται, epistatai) in ancient Greece was any sort of superintendent or overseer. In the Hellenistic kingdoms generally, an epistates is always connected with a subject district (a regional assembly), where the epistates, as resident representative of the king, exercised control and collected taxes.

== Military use ==
In military texts, an epistates (the one who stands over) is the man behind a protostates (the one who stands first). The phalanx was made up of alternate ranks of protostates and epistates. Thus, in a file of eight men, the protostates were the men in positions 1, 3, 5, and 7, while the epistates occupied positions 2, 4, 6, and 8.

== New Testament usage ==
The word epistates is also used in "common" Koine Greek and in the Greek New Testament to refer to Christ. This word is translated into English as 'master,' but that is a simplistic translation. The word might be better understood as belonging to the set of Greek words meaning 'visitor' or 'divine visitation' (episkope), 'letter of instruction' (epistole), as well as 'guardian' or 'caretaker' (episkopos), which was a word later translated as bishop. The word only appears in the Gospel of Luke (5:5; 8:24, 45; 9:33, 49; 17:13*).
