= Sacred band =

The term Sacred Band, also Sacred Company or Sacred Squadron (from Ancient Greek: Ἱερὸς Λόχος, Modern Greek: Ιερός Λόχος) can refer to one of the following military units:

== Ancient world ==
- Sacred Band of Thebes
- Sacred Band of Carthage

== Modern Greek history ==
- Sacred Band (1821), of the Greek War of Independence
- Cretan Sacred Band during the Cretan revolt (1866–1869)
- Cretan Student's Sacred Band, which participated in the Balkan Wars as a part of the Hellenic Army
- Epirote Sacred Band (1914), formed during the establishment of the Autonomous Republic of Northern Epirus.
- Sacred Squadron (Greece), a special forces unit formed during World War 2

== Fiction ==
- The Sacred Band of Stepsons, a fictional ancient cavalry unit created by Janet Morris and a series of fantasy novels and stories
  - The Sacred Band, a 2010 novel in the series

== See also ==
- Sacred Squadron (France)
