= Line (formation) =

Tactical formation of soldiers

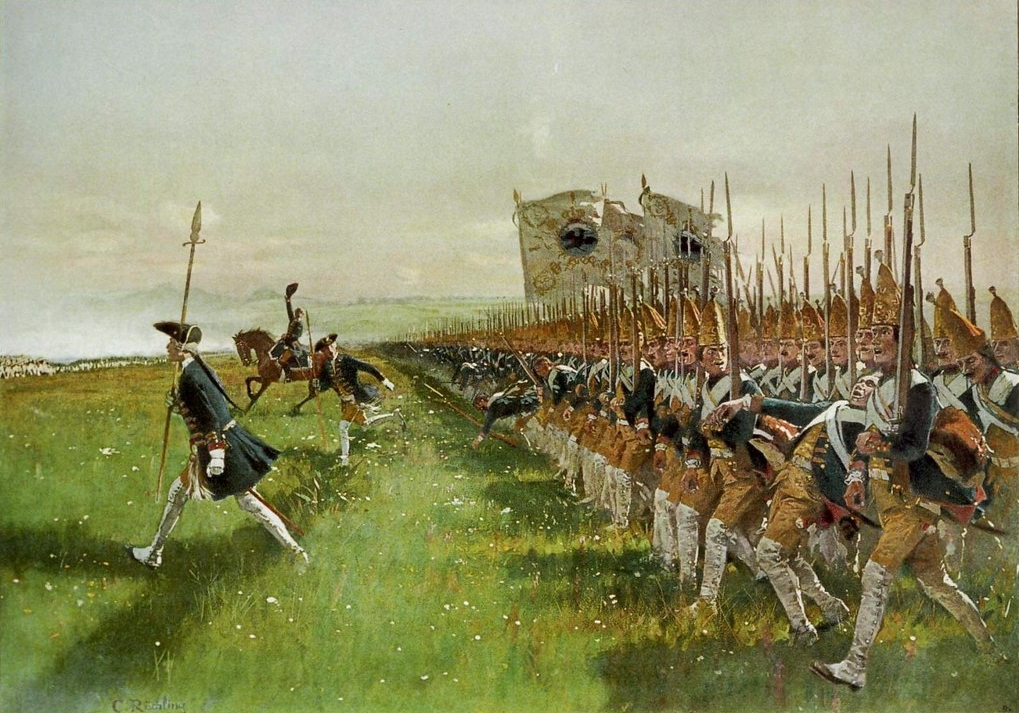
Prussian Infantry attacking in lines during the Battle of Hohenfriedberg.

The line formation was a standard tactical formation which was used in early modern warfare. It continued the phalanx formation or shield wall of infantry armed with polearms in use during antiquity and the Middle Ages.

The line formation provided the best frontage for volley fire, while sacrificing maneuverability and defence against cavalry. It came to the fore during the Age of Reason, when it was used to great effect by Frederick the Great and his enemies during the Seven Years' War. The line formation was very successfully first used with combined arms in the Thirty Years War by the Swedish king Gustavus Adolphus the Great, at the Battle of Breitenfeld.

An infantry battalion would form "in line" by placing troops in several ranks, ranging in number from two to five, with three ranks being the most common arrangement. Each rank was approximately half a metre apart from the next, and soldiers in a rank were positioned closely to each other (usually within arm's length), with just enough room to present their weapons, fire, and reload. The line formation required that the troops be well-drilled and constantly supervised by officers and non-commissioned officers (NCOs).

In 17th- and 18th-century European armies, NCOs were positioned to the rear of the line. They were equipped with long polearms, which they used to "dress" or arrange the ranks, a practice which included pushing down the weapons of any soldier who was aiming too high, as well as ensuring that the rank remained well-organized and correctly placed. Movement in line formation was very slow, and unless the battalion was superbly trained, a breakdown in cohesion was virtually assured, especially in any kind of uneven or wooded terrain. As a result, line was mostly used as a stationary formation, with troops moving in columns and then deploying to line at their destination.

Linear formations were designed to withstand cavalry, similar to pike squares of early modern warfare. It was possible for cavalry to break a line, but only if the line had already had its cohesion partially broken by enemy fire or other means. The square formation was a later measure to more effectively repel cavalry, coinciding with the increased use of heavy cavalry (Lancers and cuirassiers). This was done by arranging a larger unit of infantry (usually battalion size) in a hollow square with two or three ranks, having the soldiers affix bayonets, and the front rank kneel while holding their muskets out to create a "wall" of steel. The rear rank would then be able to fire over the heads of the men in front, thus stopping cavalry from circling the square and rendering it immobile

During the Napoleonic Wars, the British Army famously commonly used a thin two-rank line formation. This was mainly due to compensate for their lack of numbers and possibly to maximize the accuracy of their fire. This was contrary to popular belief not a doctrinal policy, but instead the result of the material conditions they often faced. British infantry would still form in three or four ranks if the situation demanded it and their numbers allowed it.

The "Thin Red Line" of the 93rd (Highland) Regiment at the Battle of Balaklava that successfully held against a Russian cavalry charge, is a famous example of a linear formation, even though their achievements were not an incredible and rare occurrence, and their fame can rather be attributed to the rise of journalism during the Crimean war, and thus the exposure of the public to the reality of military conflict.

A loose line formation called a skirmish line is used by many modern forces during assaults as it enables maximum firepower to be directed in one direction at once, useful when attacking an enemy position. It also enables the use of fire and movement.

In the British Army, the name "lines" is occasionally used to refer to the base or barracks, particularly for the Royal Horse Artillery, currently based at King George VI Lines in Woolwich.

== The line formation and cavalry ==
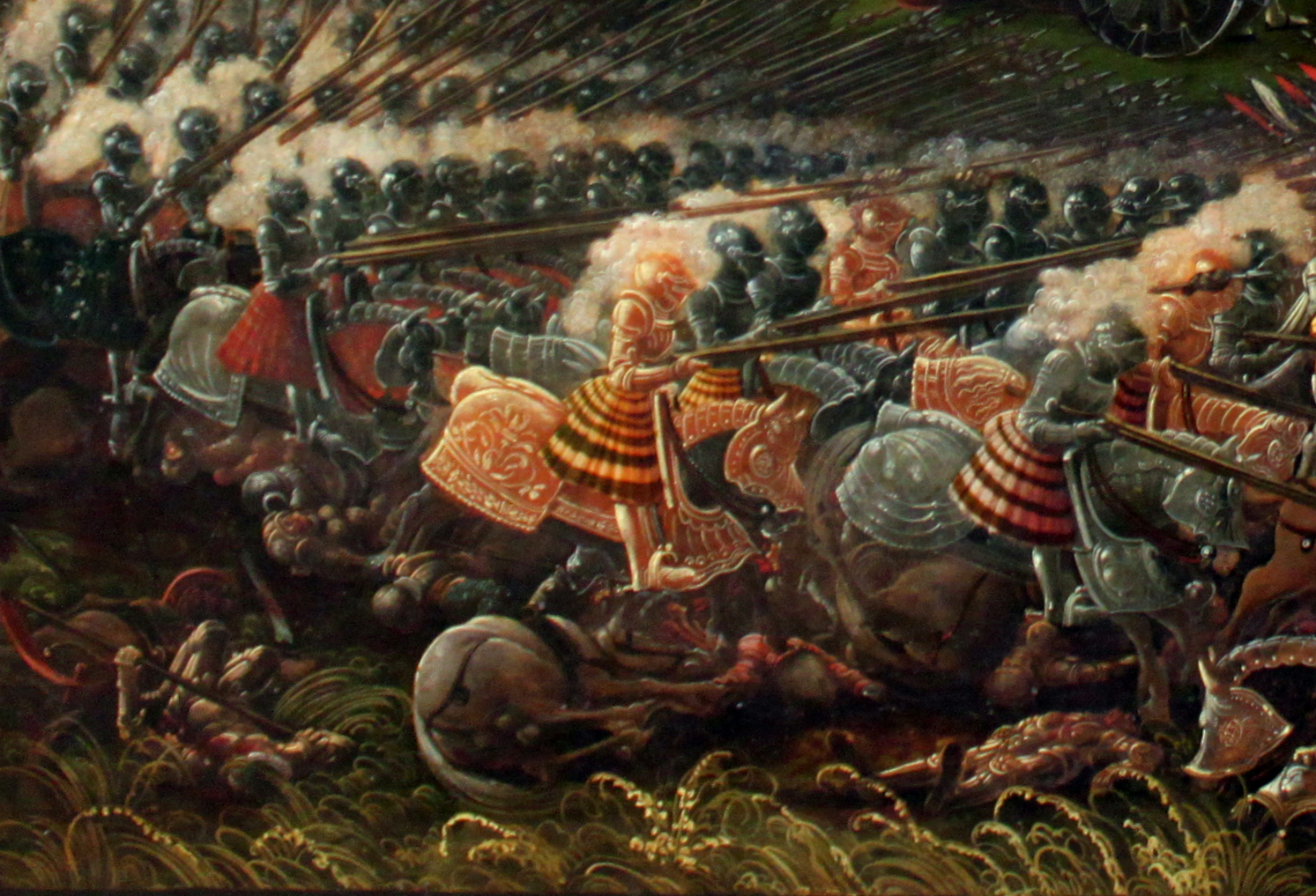
French Gendarmes

The line formation was also used by certain types of cavalry.

The Sassanid Persians, the Mamluks, and Muslim cavalry in India often used the tactics named "shower shooting". It involved a line of fairly well-armoured cavalrymen (often on armoured horses) standing in a massed static line or advancing in an ordered formation at the walk while loosing their arrows as quickly as possible by reducing their draw length.

In the 16th century, the heavy cavalry (gendarmes, reiters and cuirassiers) often attacked in a line formation. Later, dragoons began to use linear tactics, being on foot in the defence. Accordingly, the name "line cavalry" has moved from heavy cavalry to the dragoons. Hussars in the 15th-17th centuries wore armor, and often attacked in close line formation, but later hussars became a light cavalry and stopped using linear tactics. Cossacks never used linear tactics.

== See also ==
- Line of battle
- Column (formation)
- Mixed order
- Flying wedge
- Svinfylking
