= Svinfylking =

Military formation

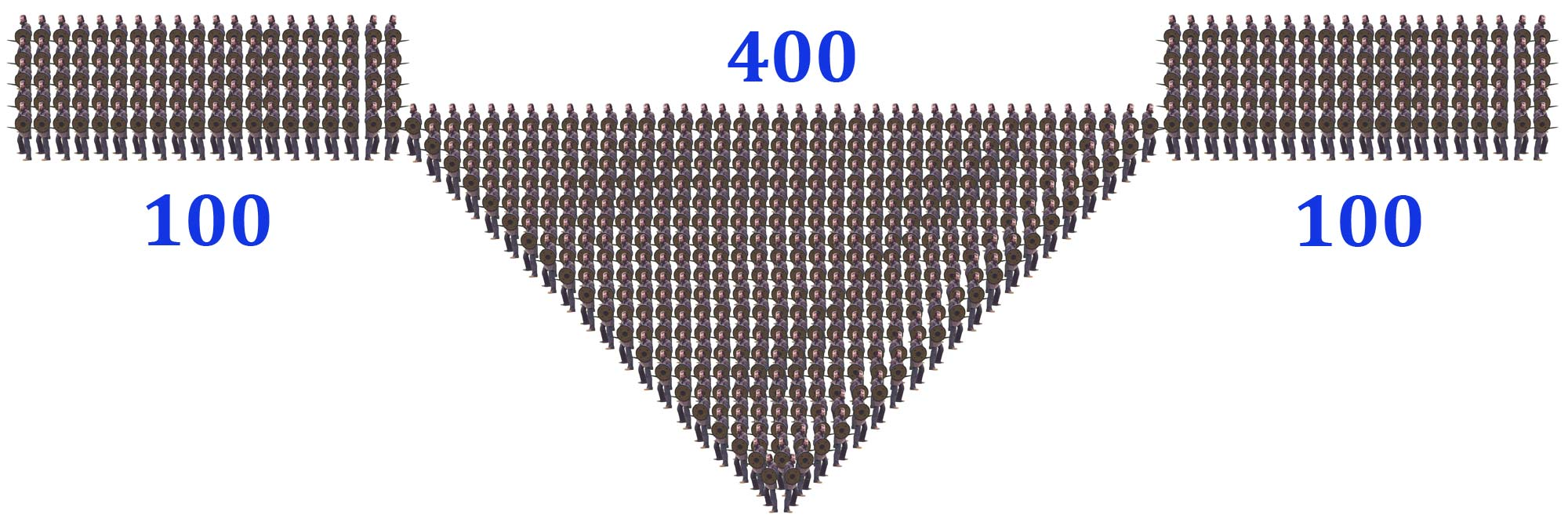
Sketch of the Svinfylking.

The Svinfylking (Old Norse for "swine array" or "boar snout") was a formation used in battle. Related to the wedge formation, it was used in Iron Age Scandinavia and later by the Vikings. It was also used by Germanic peoples during the Germanic Iron Age and was known as the Schweinskopf or "swine's head". Its invention was attributed to the god Odin.

The apex was composed of a single file. The number of warriors then increases by a constant in each rank back to its base. Families and tribesmen were ranked side by side, which added morale cohesion. The tactic was admirable for an advance against a line or even a column, but it was poor in the event of a retreat.

The formation consisted of heavily armed, presumably hand-to-hand, warriors and less-armored archers grouped in a triangle formation with the warriors in the front lines protecting the archers in center or rear. Cavalry charging a group in Svinfylking formation were frequently attacked by the outer warriors with spears, which caused complete chaos for the horses. The Svinfylking could also be used as a wedge to break through enemy lines. Several Svinfylking formations could be grouped side by side and appear something like a zig-zag to press or break the opposition's ranks. Its weakness was its inability to handle flanking. The Svinfylking was based on a monumental shock, and unless it broke the enemy lines immediately, its warriors would not hold long.

== See also ==
- Flying wedge
