= Column (formation) =

Formation of fighters marching together

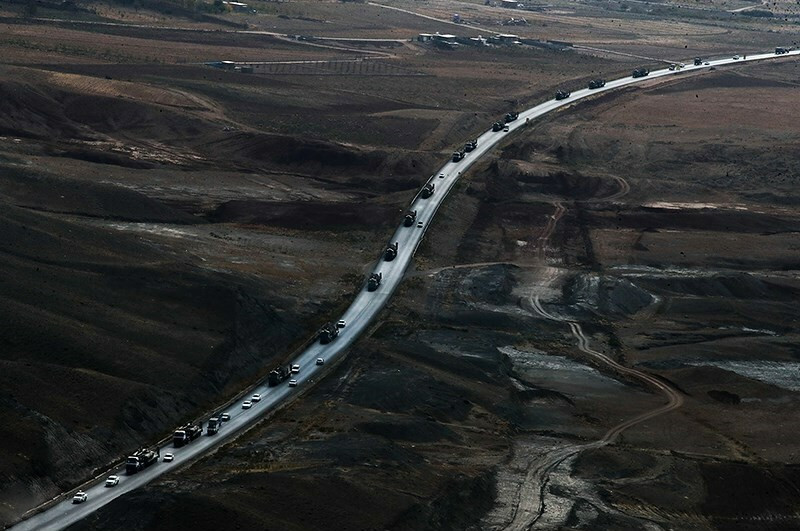
A column of the Islamic Revolutionary Guard Corps Ground Forces on exercise in 2022

In military terminology, a column is a tactical formation of fighters moving together in one or more files in which the file is significantly longer than the width of ranks in the formation. The column formation allows the unit rapid movement and a very effective charge (due to weight of numbers), and it can quickly form square to resist cavalry attacks, but by its nature only a fraction of its muskets are able to open fire.

The line formation offers a substantially larger musket frontage than the column, allowing for greater shooting capability, but requires extensive training to allow the unit to move over ground as one while retaining the line. It is also applied by modern armies to vehicles, troops and naval vessels.

== Napoleonic Wars ==
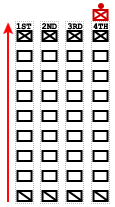
Tactical formation column

During the early stages of the French Revolutionary Wars, the French Army often attacked in column formation in an attempt to drive through enemy lines by sheer weight of numbers. Against enemy units already weakened by the fire from skirmishers or artillery, this was often successful. Later, during the Napoleonic Wars, French units would approach in column formation and deploy into line when close to the enemy. However, against the British they frequently failed to deploy into line before being engaged. During the Peninsular War, after the Battle of Sabugal (3 April 1811), the Duke of Wellington wrote, "our loss is much less than one would have supposed possible, scarcely 200 men... really these attacks against our lines with columns of men are contemptible." These failings were still evident at the Battle of Waterloo in 1815, prompting Wellington to comment, "They came on in the same old way and we defeated them in the same old way."

The military historian James R. Arnold argues that all armies of the period used column formations at times on the battlefield; the military historian Sir Charles Oman is credited with developing the theory that the French practically always attacked in heavy columns, and it is only now that this theory has been questioned by more recent experts.

=== Column of companies ===
During the Peninsular War, British riflemen of Craufurd's Light Division marching to engage the enemy but uncertain of the presence of enemy cavalrymen in the area could adopt a formation called "column of companies." Each company would form into two files of about thirty ranks and march close to the company in front. If attacked by cavalry, they could quickly form square to repel the attack.

== Korean War ==
The column formation was extensively used by Chinese infantry during the Korean War. When attacking, the Chinese would form their assault units into deep columns of platoons or squads, and drove such formations into the weak points of the enemy's defenses. The rationale for such a tactic was that repeated assaults conducted by squad- or platoon-sized skirmish parties would eventually penetrate enemy lines through sheer attrition. This utilization of column formation also give birth to the term human wave attack.

== See also ==
- Line (formation)
- Mixed order
- Flying wedge
- Svinfylking
- Flying column
