= Rank (formation) =

A rank is a line of military personnel, drawn up in line abreast (i.e. standing side by side).

== Usage ==
Commonly, you start out with a height line. Shortest person in front, all the way to the tallest person in the rear. Subsequently, when troops/sailors are called to "By the right, fall in!" they do so by forming in line abreast, shortest person "falling in" on the farmost right of the company commander. Each person in line then follows suit, lining up to the person next to them on their right shoulder until the rank is formed, then a new column begins to the rear of the first person in column one. This is repeated until all members are in the formation. Determining their initial position in relation to a marker. This may be a position on the ground or a single person placed previously to the movement. Often troops determine their spacing on the rank by extending their right arm to touch the left shoulder of the marker, or the person on that marked position, and, then starting from the right, align themselves visually to form a straight row. The alignment may then be checked by a non-commissioned officer making observations and calling orders from the end of the rank. (The order may be given to fall in by the left as well).

== See also ==
- File (formation)
