= Pavise =

Medieval oblong shield

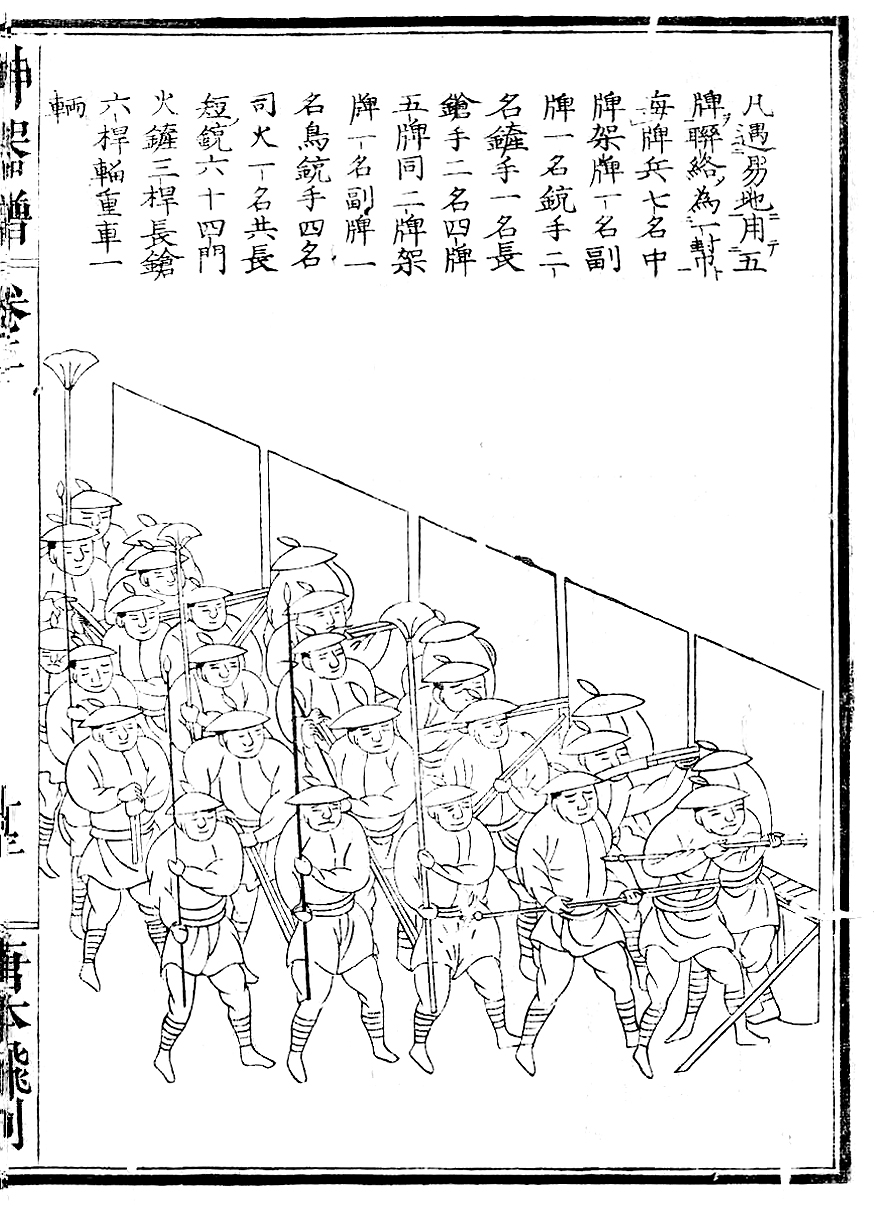
Soldiers shooting guns through holes in stationary shields (pavise), Ming dynasty, from the Shenqipu, 1598

A pavise (or pavis, pabys, or pavesen) was an oblong set shield used during the mid-14th to early 16th centuries. Often large enough to cover the entire body, it was used by archers, crossbowmen, and other infantry soldiers on the battlefield as primarily stationary cover.

== Etymology ==
The name comes from the city of Pavia, Italy.

== Historical predecessors ==
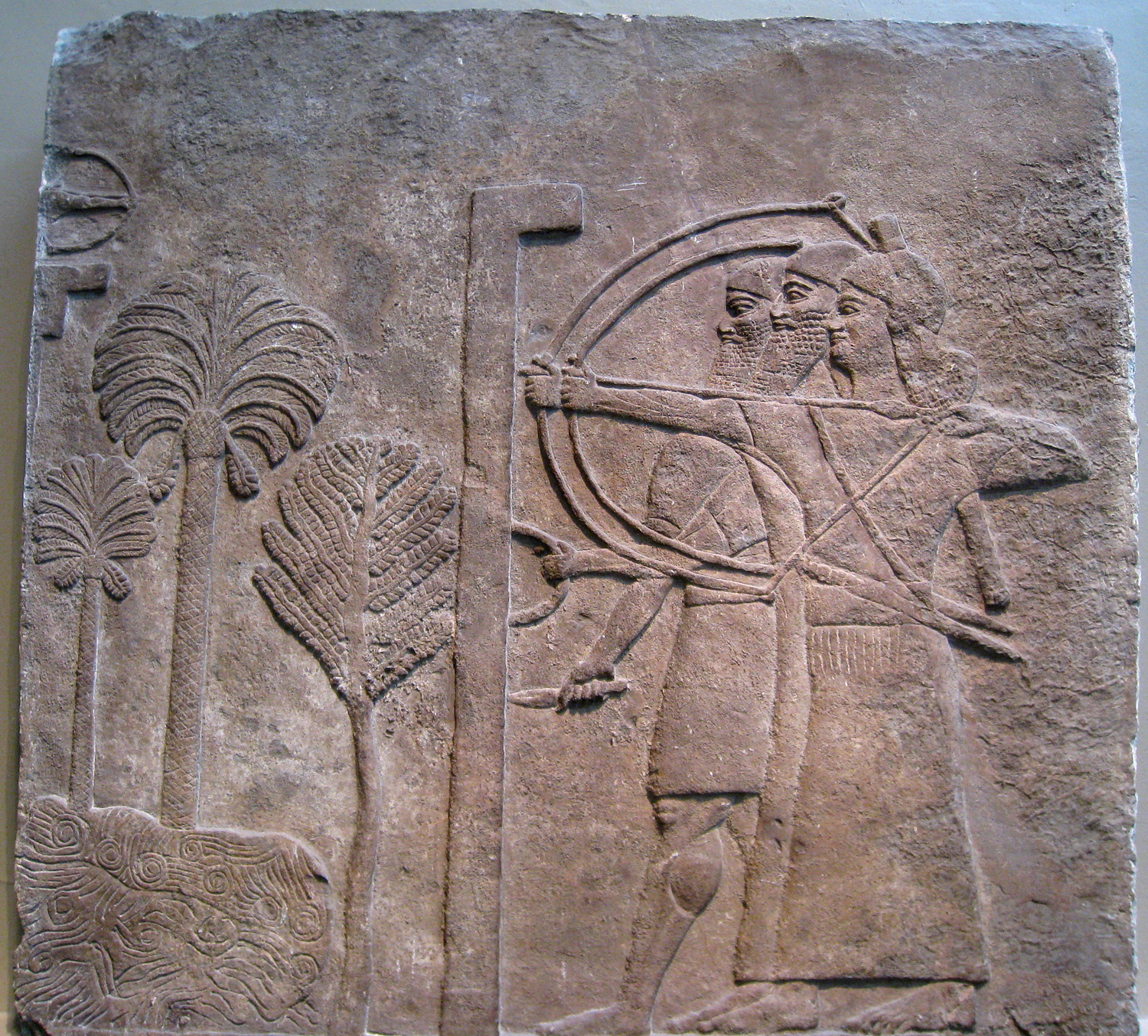
Assyrian soldier holds a large shield to protect two archers as they take aim. Circa 728 BC.

The concept of using a shield to cover an archer dates to at least the writing of Homer's Iliad, where Ajax used his shield to cover his half-brother Teucer, an archer, who would "peer round" and shoot arrows. Similar large shields made of wicker were used by Achaemenid sparabara infantry and the assyrian army.

The Roman army later adopted the scutum, a large rectangular curved shield made from three sheets of wood glued together and covered with canvas and leather, usually with a spindle-shaped boss along the vertical length of the shield.

The shape of the scutum allowed packed formations of legionaries to overlap their shields to provide an effective barrier against projectiles. The most novel use was the testudo, which consisted of legionaries holding shields above themselves to protect against descending projectiles such as arrows, spears, or objects thrown by defenders on walls.

== Description and history ==
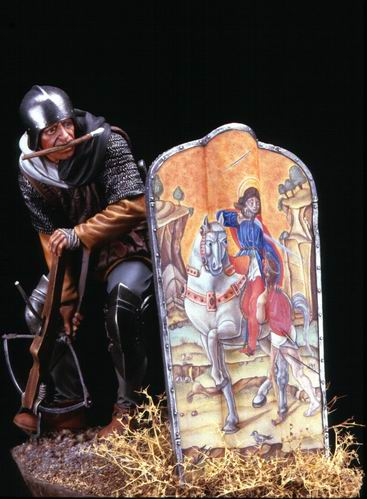
Model of a medieval crossbowman using a pavise shield. It is decorated with Bartolomeo Vivarini's St. Martin and the Beggar.

Of European origin, the pavise was large, square and convex. A smaller version for hand-to-hand combat and for wearing on the backs of men-at-arms was also made. The pavise is characterized by its prominent central ridge.

The pavise was primarily used by archers and crossbowmen in the Middle Ages, particularly during sieges. It was carried by a pavisier, usually an archer, or, especially for the larger ones, by a specialist pavise-bearer. The pavise was held in place by the pavisier or sometimes deployed in the ground with a spike attached to the bottom. While reloading their weapons, archers and crossbowmen would crouch behind them to shelter against incoming missile attacks.

Pavises were often painted with the coat of arms of the town where they were made, and sometimes stored in the town arsenal for when the town came under attack. Religious icons such as St. Barbara and St. George were featured on the front of pavises. The Hussite chalice was often featured on pavises during the Hussite Wars. Most pavises were covered in a coarse, carpet-base-like canvas, before being painted with oil and egg-based paints. Only 200 or so exist today, but many were present in the period.

=== Naval equivalent ===
A related term, pavisade or pavesade, refers to a decorative row of shields or a band of canvas hung around a sailing vessel to prevent an opponent from observing the activities of those on board and to discourage boarding.

== Pavesarii ==
The Genoese crossbowmen, who were an internationally-recognized elite corps, made use of the pavise, utilizing pavesarii (shield bearers). Having over three crossbowmen per pavise suggests that they took turns using the pavise as cover and were used primarily in static or defensive formations.

== See also ==
- Mantlet
