= Tactical formation =

Arrangement of movable military forces

In military-style operations, a tactical formation (or tactical order) is the arrangement or deployment of movable military or policing forces such as infantry, cavalry, AFVs, military aircraft, or naval vessels.

== History ==
Formations occur in tribal societies, such as the pua rere of the Māori. Ancient Greek and Ancient Roman armies developed effective disciplined infantry formations. Ancient or medieval formations include shield walls (skjaldborg in Old Norse), phalanxes (lines of battle in close order), testudo formations, and skirmish lines. A renewed emphasis on military formations came with the mass use of firearms in the European Military Revolution of the Early modern period.

== List of tactical formations ==
Tactical formations include:

- Forlorn hope
- Formation flying
- Baguazhen
- Box
- Coil: Similar to the Herringbone formation, the coil formation allows for 360 degree security while at the halt. This type of formation is also used when refueling aircraft as well as during resupply. Sometimes platoon leaders also use it when briefing to platoon sergeants. Air guards and dismounted fire teams are also in position while this formation is being used.
- Column
- Echelon
- Herringbone
- Line
- Shock troops
- Skirmish
- Square
- Stack
- Staggered column
- V formation
- Vanguard
- Wedge and inverted wedge
  - Svinfylking
- File: The file formation is used in elements of up to a platoon size. A file formation is used for close terrain, often in dense vegetation or when there is low visibility. The file formation is easiest to control, and provides fire to the ranks should an ambush from the side occur.
- Diamond: Similar to the Wedge and inverted wedge, the diamond formation allows for the fourth section to follow the lead element. The advantages to this formation include having the ability to control elements even in a tight terrain, and allows for quick maneuverability to assign squads as the assaulting element, and assign certain squads to support-by-fire.
- Crescent or bullhorn: used across Southern Africa, wrongly attributed to Shaka.

== See also ==
- Close order formation
- Division (military)
- Laager
- Military organization
- Night attack formation

== Sources ==
- Journal of the Polynesian Society, Vols. 1-19, 1892–1910

"FM 3-21.71 Chapter 3".
