= Phoulkon =

Byzantine infantry formation

The phoulkon (Greek: φοῦλκον), in Latin fulcum, was an infantry formation utilized by the military of the late Roman and Byzantine Empire. It is a formation in which an infantry formation closes ranks and the first two or three lines form a shield wall while those behind them hurl projectiles. It was used in both offensive and defensive stances.

== Etymology ==
The term phoulkon is first attested to in the Strategikon of Maurice, a military manual written in the 590s. Written in Greek, the author of the Strategikon "also frequently employed Latin and other terms which have been in common military use", as Latin continued to be the language of the army at that time. Therefore, the word, like other military terminology found in the manual, is likely a Greek transliteration of a hypothetical Latin word *fulcum, though this Latin term is not attested to in any surviving texts. The only other early Byzantine author to use the term was Theophanes the Confessor, who describes Rhazates arranging his troops in three phoulka when facing Heraclius's army at the Battle of Nineveh (627). Later Byzantine writings, such as De velitatione bellica and Praecepta Militaria, describe keeping a portion of troops, either cavalry or infantry, in phoulka to serve as guard while the rest of the army dispersed for pillaging or foraging. These later usages appear to have evolved to simply mean a "battle formation", rather than Maurice's specific description of a shield wall tactic.

No consensus exists on the etymology of phoulkon. One proposal derives it from the word furca, a fork, to describe a body of troops arranged in a wedge shape. Another proposal derives the term from a Germanic word describing a body of troops; similar terms are found in the Germanic languages, including Old English folc ("host, army"; cf. gefylce "troop, division"), Old Saxon folc ("troop, division"), and Old Norse fólk ("people, host, troop"), fylki ("array, formation"). Germanic soldiers were attested to in the Late Roman army, recruited either directly into the army or serving as allied foederati.

Ancient Greek "εφελκίς", "εφέλκιον" (efelkis, efelkion), scab of a sore, the protective crust formed over a wound, word used also to describe a defensive shield formation. From "επί" (epi), "on" + "έλκος" (elkos), "wound", latinicized as: "fulcum".

== Formation ==
The Strategikon describes the phoulkon as a close-order infantry formation. Before close contact with the enemy and just outside of archery range, the command "ad fulco" (αδ φουλκω) would be issued, and infantry were to close ranks and form a shield wall from the first two lines. As they advanced, light infantry from the rear would shoot arrows at the enemy while the heavy infantry could hurl martiobarbuli darts or throw their spears before closing in to engage in hand-to-hand combat with the spatha sword. If faced with enemy cavalry, the first three ranks of the phoulkon would form a shield wall and thrust their spears outwards while fixing the ends to the ground, while the third and rear ranks would hurl projectiles and the light infantry shoot arrows.

Though only the Strategikon explicitly describes this formation as a phoulkon, such tactics appear to have been established Roman practice. Compare the description of the Strategikon with earlier accounts:

If the enemy [cavalry], coming within a bow shot, attempts to break or dislodge the phalanx ... then the infantry close up in the regular manner. And the first, second and third man in each file are to form themselves into a phoulkon, that is, one shield upon another, and having thrust their spears straight forward beyond their shields, fix them firmly in the ground ... They also lean their shoulders and put their weight against their shields so that they might easily endure the pressure from those outside. The third man, standing more upright, and the fourth, holding their spears like javelins either stab those coming close or hurl them and draw their swords.

— Strategikon

An almost identical tactic is described centuries earlier, for use against the Alans:

If [the enemy cavalry] do approach, the first three ranks, closing their shields together and exerting pressure with their shoulders, should receive the attack as steadfastly as possible and locking together very closely, pressing themselves together as firmly as they are able. The fourth rank should throw javelins overhead, while the third rank should strike with their spears or throw them like javelins unstintingly at both horses and riders.

— Arrian, Ektaxis kata Alanon

Descriptions of both shield walls used in attack and as an anti-cavalry formation with spears fixed into the ground exist throughout Roman history, though non-military writers tended to use classical vocabulary in describing such formations as a testudo, its Greek translation chelone (χελώνη), or a phalanx. However, these descriptions referred to the use of shield walls in battle, as opposed to the classical testudo formation used in siege warfare. Examples include the Battle of Callinicum, where a small group of Byzantine infantry and dismounted cavalry in the rearguard formed a shield wall that held off Persian archery and cavalry charges, and the Battle of Taginae, where a small group of fifty Byzantine soldiers seized a hill and formed into a "phalanx" that held off repeated Ostrogothic cavalry charges with their shield wall and grounded spears.

== See also ==
- Byzantine battle tactics
- Testudo formation
- Pike and shot

== General bibliography ==
- Rance, Philip (2004). "The Fulcum, the Late Roman and Byzantine Testudo: The Germanization of Roman Infantry Tactics?". Greek, Roman, and Byzantine Studies. 44: 265–326.
