= Operation Atlanta =

Part of the Vietnam War (1966)

- Part of Vietnam War
Date	19 October – December 1966
Location	Đồng Nai Province, South Vietnam
Result	US operational success

Belligerents
United States	Viet Cong

Commanders and leaders
	Unknown

Units involved
11th Armored Cavalry Regiment	274th Regiment

Casualties and losses
15 killed	161 killed

Operation Atlanta was a road security operation in Đồng Nai Province carried out by the 11th Armored Cavalry Regiment (11th ACR) from 19 October to December 1966 during the Vietnam War and was the first major combat operation of the 11th ACR in the war.

== Background ==
The objective of the operation was to clear and secure lines of communication in three provinces near Saigon and to secure the new Blackhorse Base Camp south of Xuan Loc. At first the operation was limited to clearing and securing Highway 1 from Xuan Loc to Bien Hoa and Route 2 to the base camp. As the operation continued, however, the 11th ACR extended its operations away from the roads and throughout the area. Regimental experience varied from roadrunner and convoy escort duties to cordon and search operations in which the squadrons sealed off an area and then worked, both mounted and dismounted, to drive out the Viet Cong (VC).

It was during the operation that the 11th ACR fought its first major battle. Twice the VC tried to ambush and destroy resupply convoys escorted by units of the 1st Squadron, but in both attempts was defeated by the firepower and maneuverability of the cavalry.

== Operation ==
=== Battle of Ap Hung Nghia ===
On 20 November, two battalions and headquarters of the VC 274th Regiment, the battle-hardened Dong Nai Regiment, moved into ambush positions along Highway 1, west of Xuan Loc. Midway between the provincial capitals of Bien Hoa and Xuan Loc, Highway 1 dropped sharply to a stream bed and then rose to a gently rolling plateau. A dirt road running north and south intersected Highway 1 at this point. Low hills rising only 10-20 meters above the road level began about 180 meters from the highway on both sides. On the north side of the highway, grass high enough to hide a standing man covered the ground. Rising like an island in the sea of grass was an expanse of jungle 1,000 meters square, beginning at the north-south dirt road and running parallel to Highway 1, 300 meters north of the edge of the highway. Along the south side of the highway a wall of jungle had grown up around the trees of an old rubber plantation stretching from the province boundary east for 1,000 meters and ending abruptly at a banana grove. The banana grove lined the south side of the highway for 300 meters before it gave way to an open area ending at the hamlet of Ap Hung Nghia (10.938°N 107.102°E).

Because the jungle and banana grove offered concealment for approach and withdrawal, the VC commander placed his main force of over a thousand men on the south side of the road, camouflaged and ready to fire automatic weapons and antitank rockets point-blank onto the highway. The ambush extended from just inside the west end of the jungle to the outskirts of Ap Hung Nghia, a distance of 1,500 meters. To handle any US troops who might dismount and take refuge on the north side of the road, the VC commander deployed infantrymen alone or in groups of two or three across the highway in the tall grass. In the classic manner of VC ambush forces, heavy weapons marked both ends of the killing zone. A 75mm recoilless rifle, positioned less than 15 feet (4.6 m) from the road, marked the beginning of the killing zone, just 20 feet (6.1 m) inside the west end of the jungle close by the banana grove. A second 75mm recoilless rifle dominated the road in the eastern half of the killing zone from the forward slope of a slight hill just to the east of the banana grove. A 57mm recoilless rifle farther up the hill, three hundred meters to the east, and an 82mm mortar deep in the jungle were to provide supporting fire. Heavy machine guns hidden in huts scattered through the killing zone were to engage American helicopters and jets. Regimental headquarters operated on the crest of a hill 500 meters west of Ap Hung Nghia, overlooking the entire section of road in the killing zone. Once the ambush was executed the 274th Regiment was to withdraw to railroad tracks parallel to and a thousand meters south of the highway, then along a trail leading due south under a heavy canopy of jungle. Bunkers along the trail for a distance of 2km would provide cover against air attack, while bunkers at the beginning of the trail and a hundred meters south of the railroad tracks would provide defensive positions for a delaying force.

By 06:00 on 21 November most of the convoy’s trucks waited at the starting point at Long Binh Post, for the movement of the 1st Squadron 11th ACR to their new home at Blackhorse Base Camp with departure scheduled for 07:00. However, as the departure was delayed the convoy grew as more vehicles joined it. At 08:40 the convoy escort commander 1st Lieutenant Neil Keltner, commanding the 1st Platoon, Troop C, 1st Squadron, gathered the vehicles for his escort, four ACAVs from his platoon and four from Troop C's 2nd Platoon and an ACAV from Troop A that had missed that troop's move the preceding day. Captain Robert Smith, the Forward air controller (FAC) in a Cessna O-1 Bird Dog was circling above the convoy that now consisted of over 80 vehicles. For the march, Keltner placed his ACAVs in pairs: a pair at the head and rear of the column and at two points equidistant within the column. At 09:20 Lieutenant Keltner gave the signal to move out.

As the convoy passed through the village of Hố Nai, a VC observation post flashed word to the 274th Regiment that the convoy was on the way. Haphazardly formed, lacking unit integrity, the convoy was by its very nature difficult to protect. Gaps within the column began to develop early as lightly laden vehicles pulled far ahead of heavily loaded trucks. Accordion-like, the line stretched.

The convoy had been on the road less than 45 minutes when the 11th ACR’s tactical operational center, received an intelligence message indicating the presence of the headquarters of the VC 274th Regiment 15 kilometers west of Xuan Loc, along Highway 1 near Ap Hung Nghia. The S-2 intelligence officer radioed a warning of the VC location to the 1st Squadron's operations center at Long Binh. At the same time the assistant operations officer, ordered the 11th ACR light fire team (two armed UH-1 helicopters) aloft to cover the convoy. Keltner's ACAV in the second group of escort vehicles was within 1000 meters of the ambush site when his radio crackled with a message from 1st Squadron headquarters warning of suspected VC activity. Keltner had received similar messages before and each time the VC had failed to show up. He immediately radioed the FAC to verify the location of the front of the column and the relation of the lead vehicles to the suspected VC position. Two FACs were by this time circling overhead as one had arrived to relieve the other. Both already were alert to the possible VC activity, having received a coded message two minutes before Keltner. The FACs reported that the head of the convoy, had just passed the suspected VC location. Keltner quickly radioed his ACAVs to warn them of the imminent danger. All but the lead ACAV, C22, answered. A few seconds later at 10:25 C22 reported receiving fire from small arms and automatic weapons and asked permission to return fire. Even as Keltner gave the permission, his own vehicle came alongside the edge of the banana grove that lay south of the highway, and Keltner informed squadron headquarters that the convoy was under fire.

Reacting to earlier counterambush training, Keltner decided to run the column through the small arms fire. From the report of the lead ACAV he believed that the fire was only a harassing tactic, or at the most that it came from only a platoon or a company of VC. In any case, with 80 vehicles to protect and only nine ACAV's to do the job, Keltner felt he had little choice. Still on the move, he ordered his own crew to spray the banana trees south of the road with fire. Just as his machine guns opened up, a mortar round burst close behind his ACAV and immediately in front of the next, A34, but did no damage. While all the ACAV's of the first two groups poured machine gun fire into both sides of the road, nearly half of the convoy, including Keltner's own vehicle, passed safely through and beyond the killing zone. But the full force of the VC ambush still had not been brought to bear. Even though Keltner had received the warning too late to stop the column short of the killing zone, he had been able to alert his escorts almost at the exact moment the VC moved to spring their ambush. The Dong Nai Regiment had been denied the benefit of total surprise.

At Long Binh Lieutenant colonel Martin Howell, the squadron commander, heard Keltner report small arms fire. Like Keltner, he believed it to be harassing fire but nevertheless dispatched the remainder of Troop C to the scene. With Troop C moving out of the staging area and the light fire team helicopters, alerted earlier, rushing to the scene, help was on the way even before the battle reached a peak. Although most of the front half of the convoy had passed out of danger, eight trucks had fallen behind because the first of the eight was carrying a heavy load. As these last trucks and the section led by the next two ACAVs, C18 and C13, entered the killing zone, the ACAVs fired first into the edge of the jungle and, as they kept moving, into the banana grove. The VC answered with small arms and automatic weapons from both sides of the road. To many of the men in the following trucks, this fusillade was the first warning of an ambush, for vehicle noises had drowned out the earlier exchange. The trucks not yet under fire began to slow down, their drivers displaying the uncertainty they felt about what lay ahead. Yet the convoy kept moving and the road ahead remained clear. The exchange of fire grew in volume as those trucks with "shotgun" riders began to engage the ambushers on the right (south) side of the road. Then a round from a recoilless rifle struck C18 on the edge of the loading ramp but failed to stop the ACAV. As the firefight continued at close range, the trucks forming the rear of the column, not yet in the killing zone, began to pull over to the side of the road. Those immediately behind C18 and C13, already under fire, stopped and the men aboard raced for cover in ditches on either side of the road. The only vehicles moving at that point were the last eight trucks from the first half of the column and ACAV's C13 and C18.

Hardly had C18 escaped one round from a recoilless rifle when another burned a hole in its right side, starting a fire. This hit wounded the ACAV commander, but the crew continued to fire the .50-caliber machine gun and the M60s into the VC position south of the road. Now another recoilless rifle round struck the heavily loaded lead truck whose slowness had opened a gap in the truck column. The gasoline tank exploded, instantly killing the two men in the cab. The truck lurched to the left into the ditch on the north side of the road, its trailer still on the pavement, partially blocking the highway. A column of thick black smoke shot into the morning sky. While the crew of C18 continued to fire, the wounded commander radioed his situation to Keltner. After passing the word on to squadron headquarters, Keltner turned around to enter the fight again, but before he could return C18 burst into flames. On orders of the critically wounded sergeant, all the crew except the driver evacuated the vehicle, dragging the sergeant out of the commander's hatch and carrying him into the high grass on the north side of the highway. Only light fire had come from that direction, and it seemed the safest place to go. The driver of the burning C18 finally got it started again and headed down the road through a hail of small arms and antitank rocket fire, hoping to distract the VC's attention and allow the other crewmen to make good their escape. He succeeded, but was shot dead 400 meters down the road.

Even as C18 fought, the troopers in C13, a few meters farther forward along the road, moved to counter small arms fire and grenades raining on the three remaining trucks to their front. Racing forward, the driver interposed his ACAV between the trucks and heavy fire coming from the banana grove on the right side of the road, but not before a recoilless rifle sent a second truck up in flames. As C13 came abreast of the burning truck, another round exploded against its right gun shield, destroying the M60 machine gun, killing the gunner, and wounding everybody but the driver. A recoilless rifle round struck the engine compartment and C13 began to burn. Although the driver himself was now wounded, he continued to move forward, deeper into the killing zone. Veering past the truck trailer that partially blocked the road, he went 1,500 meters past the end of the ambush. Only then did the crew abandon the burning vehicle and moments later C13 exploded.

Another round from a recoilless rifle hit one of the trucks that the trailer of the lead truck had blocked. Then came more fire, as the VC gunners methodically destroyed two more trucks. The US forces replied with fierce counterfire, as no ACAVs remained in the killing zone to provide fire support, they fully expected the VC to emerge from their ambush and overrun the ditch. But the VC were now under attack from the air. The column of smoke from the burning trucks was a beacon upon which air support was converging. A minute after the first truck was hit, the two FACs began firing white phosphorus marking rockets on the puffs of smoke from weapons firing in the banana grove and into the jungle opposite the burning trucks. Even as the first trucks were hit and the first rockets struck, the ambush was breaking up. When the two O-1s pulled out of their diving attacks, the only UH-1 gunship operational with the 1st Squadron that day moved in. From having monitored the 1st Platoon's radio frequency, it made two passes, firing machine guns and a total of eight rockets into the ambush positions. Close behind came the regimental light fire team, alerted only minutes before. Diverted from an administrative mission in mid-flight, the team commander, approached the scene from the south. The second helicopter had taken off from the Blackhorse helipad at the base camp and approached from the east. On the first pass the two UH-1s loosed machine gun fire and six pairs of rockets at the VC. On the second pass the three UH-1s poured continuous machine gun fire and nine pairs of rockets into the VC positions. On a third and then a fourth firing run they expended the remaining six pairs of rockets and continued to hit the VC with machine gun fire. While the fourth helicopter firing run was in progress, the regimental operations center radioed an order for the team to move north of the road to make way for a strike by Air Force jets. Only eight minutes into the ambush three F-100 Super Sabres now joined the fight. The air liaison officer at the Blackhorse operations center directed the aircraft to strike 50 meters inside the jungle, south of the highway. The jets dropped six high-drag 500-pound bombs at the western edge of the ambush. The FAC then marked for a Napalm run, and the jets dropped six tanks on more VC troops running south; they followed with a strafing run of 20mm cannon fire on VC fleeing along a trail in the jungle south of the road.

As the air strike took place, Keltner was directing the commander of his lead ACAV to take that part of the convoy that had escaped the ambush on to the base camp. He himself turned his vehicle along with C10 back toward the burning trucks. Coming first upon C13, burning on the road, Keltner directed C10 to remain with the wounded crewmen who had taken cover in the high grass on the north side of the road until a helicopter could arrive, then C10 would rejoin Keltner. Alone, Keltner's ACAV pressed on at top speed toward the burning trucks, in the process radioing for a medical evacuation helicopter for the wounded. A helicopter from the Blackhorse base camp, already overhead and monitoring Keltner's frequency, responded immediately. As Keltner's ACAV sped along the highway, 10 VC suddenly darted across its path. Both the VC and the gunners in the ACAV opened fire. Five of the VC fell; the others made it into the scrub jungle south of the road. Keltner's left machine gunner, hit in the head, died instantly. During this brief engagement a 57mm recoilless rifle fired five rounds at Keltner's vehicle. Despite the speed of C16, 35-45 mph, the last round hit its left side. Although the antitank round failed to stop the ACAV, Keltner and his right machine gunner were wounded by fragments and the intercom and radios were knocked out, leaving Keltner only a portable radio lashed to the outside of the commander's hatch. Intended for maintaining contact with the FAC, this radio provided the only remaining link between Keltner and his platoon.

When he reached the abandoned and still-smoldering hulk of C18, Keltner could detect no sign of the crew. He stopped long enough to remove the vehicle's machine guns, then drove on until he reached the burning trucks. From the ditch along the south side of the road, the men from the trucks were still exchanging small arms fire with the VC. Five to six minutes had passed since C13 and C18 had been knocked out. Calling for a second medical helicopter for the wounded truck drivers, Keltner rode down the line of trucks to make certain he had missed no casualties. Finding none, he continued to the rear of the convoy, where he left his dead gunner and exchanged his ACAV for C23 which had an operable intercom and radios. Mounted in C23 and accompanied by C16, Keltner returned to the burning trucks, his gunners firing from the moving vehicle into the jungle. When the men from the trucks told him that most of the VC fire was now coming from the north, Keltner radioed for an air strike against the edge of the jungle lying north of the highway. This call coincided with the end of the strafing run by the F-100s, but in response to a request by the 1st Squadron operations center, initiated only minutes after the ambush was sprung, two F-5 Freedom Fighters had arrived over the ambush site. They swept in on the target, hitting the west edge of the patch of jungle with cluster bomb units. Observing the strike while cruising along the road with his machine gunners firing into the jungle on either side, Keltner called in an adjustment to Howell, who had arrived overhead in a UH-1, and on the second pass the aircraft dropped napalm tanks closer to the south edge of the jungle. No further VC fire came from the north. After another quick but unsuccessful search for the crew of C18, Keltner returned again to the burning trucks even as the first of the relief forces began to arrive.

When Howell had reacted to Keltner's first report of small arms fire by ordering Troop C to the scene, he had some qualms that he might be sending troops to deal with only a few snipers. But when Keltner's report of burning trucks came a few moments later, Howell ordered both Troop B and Company D (a tank company) to follow Troop C. As the squadron moved, Howell mounted his waiting helicopter. As soon as he gained altitude he could see the column of smoke from the trucks and the bombs of the air strike rising from the killing zone. Guiding on the smoke, Howell was soon over the ambush site, talking to Keltner, adjusting the second air strike, and formulating his battle plan. Troop C would go south of the highway and then east along the railroad tracks, cutting off the most obvious route of retreat, while Troop B would swing north in an arc connecting each end of the ambush. The tanks of Company D would push along the highway to force the enemy into the encircling troops. As the relief force drew closer to the ambush, Howell and Keltner adjusted the second air strike to be brought against the VC positions. Minutes later, Troop B swung north through the strike zone, Troop C turned south, and Company D's tanks swept into the grass north of the highway. It was 11:00, only 35 minutes since the ambush had struck, and the squadron already had travelled over 20 kilometers. While the squadron maneuvered, Keltner searched again for C18's missing crew. This time he found the men in the grass north of the road protecting their critically wounded commander. Within a few minutes a helicopter had evacuated them.

Twenty minutes after the relief force arrived, the southern pincer made contact with the enemy as they fired at what proved to be the rear guard of the 274th Regiment, fleeing south across the railroad tracks, killing two VC and capturing a Chinese-made 57mm recoilless rifle. For the rest of the day the tanks and ACAVs continued closing the circle around the ambush site. Cruising through the grass adjacent to the highway, Company D flushed out and killed, one at a time, five VC. Troop A, released from the base camp, joined the squadron and killed one VC, and Troop B captured another. By 16:00 it became clear that, even with the help of a South Vietnamese infantry battalion that made a cursory search of the area, the squadron had failed to trap the main VC force. Howell then directed the squadron to coil around the ambush site for the night. After encountering a few VC patrols that night, the squadron searched the battlefield the next day and for two days following. The men found bunkers along the escape route and a total of 30 VC dead. The convoy and its escort had lost seven men killed and eight wounded, four trucks and two ACAVs destroyed.

=== Battle of Suối Cát ===
When intelligence reports indicated that there was a VC battalion in the vicinity of Suối Cát (10.909°N 107.356°E), 50 km of Saigon, the 1st Squadron conducted a limited zone reconnaissance but found no signs of the VC. Shortly thereafter, on 2 December 1966, Troop A was handling base camp security, Troop B was securing a rock quarry near Cia Ray, and the balance of the squadron was performing maintenance at Blackhorse Base Camp. Early that morning a resupply convoy from Troop B, consisting of two tanks, three ACAVs and two 2 ½ ton trucks, had travelled the 25km from the rock quarry to Blackhorse without incident.

At 16:00 the convoy commander readied his convoy for the return trip to Cia Ray. The column had a tank in the lead, followed by two ACAV's, two trucks, another ACAV, and, finally, the remaining tank. The convoy commander was in the lead tank, and after making sure that he had contact with the FAC in an armed helicopter overhead, moved his convoy out towards Suối Cát. As the convoy passed through Suối Cát, the men in the column noticed an absence of children and an unusual stillness. Sensing danger, the company commander was turning in the tank commander's hatch to observe closely both sides of the road when he accidentally tripped the turret control handle. The turret moved suddenly to the right, apparently scaring the VC into prematurely firing a command detonated mine approximately 10 meters in front of the tank. The commander immediately shouted an ambush warning over the troop frequency and led his convoy in a charge through what had become a hail of VC fire while he blasted both sides of the road. Even as the lead tank engaged, Troop B nearest the scene immediately headed toward the action. At squadron headquarters, Company D, a tank company, Troop C and the howitzer battery hastened towards the ambush. Troop A, on perimeter security at the base camp followed as soon as it was released. The gunship on station immediately began delivering fire and called for additional assistance, while the FAC radioed for air support.

When the convoy reached the eastern edge of the ambush, one of the ACAV's, already hit three times, was struck again and caught fire. At this point Troop B arrived, moved into the ambush from the east, and immediately came under intense fire as the VC maneuvered toward the burning ACAV. Troop B fought its way through the ambush, alternately employing the herringbone formation and moving west, and encountering the VC in sizable groups. The squadron commander arrived over the scene by helicopter 10 minutes after the first fire. He immediately designated Highway 1 a fire coordination line, and directed tactical aircraft to strike to the east and south while artillery fired to the north and west. As Company D and Troop C reached Suối Cát he ordered them to begin firing as they left the east side of the village. The artillery battery went into position in Suối Cát. By this time Troop B had traversed the entire ambush area, turned around, and was making a second trip back towards the east. Company D and Troop C followed close behind, raking both sides of the road with fire as they moved. The tanks, fired 90mm Canister shot mowed down the charging VC and destroying a 57mm recoilless rifle. Midway through the ambush zone, Troop B halted in a herringbone formation while Company D and Troop C continued to the east toward the junction of Route 333 and Highway 1. Troop A, now to the west of the ambush entered the area, surprised a VC scavenging party, killing 15.

The squadron commander halted Troop A to the west of Troop B. Company D was turned around at the eastern side of the ambush and positioned to the east of Troop B. Troop C was sent southwest on Route 1 to trap VC forces if they moved in that direction. As Troops A and B and Company D consolidated at the ambush site VC fire became intense around Troop B. The VC forces were soon caught in a crossfire when the cavalry units converged. As darkness approached the US troops prepared night defensive positions and artillery fire was shifted to the south to seal off VC escape routes. A search of the battlefield the next morning found over 100 VC dead, VC documents captured in May 1967 recorded the loss of three VC battalion commanders and four company commanders in the Suoi Cat action.

== Aftermath ==
The success of the tactics for countering ambushes developed during Atlanta resulted in their adoption as standard procedure for the future. The tactics called for the ambushed element to employ all its firepower to protect the escorted vehicles and fight clear of the killing zone. Once clear the cavalry would regroup and return to the killing zone. All available reinforcements would be rushed to the scene as rapidly as possible to attack the flanks of the ambush. Artillery and tactical air would be used to the maximum extent.
