= Night attack =

Night attack may refer to:

- Night combat, combat that occurs during the hours of darkness
- Night attack formation, the arrangement of soldiers in advancing in night combat
- Night attack at Târgoviște, a battle in 1462
- Night Attack (album), a 1981 album by The Angels
