= Close order formation =

Military tactical formation

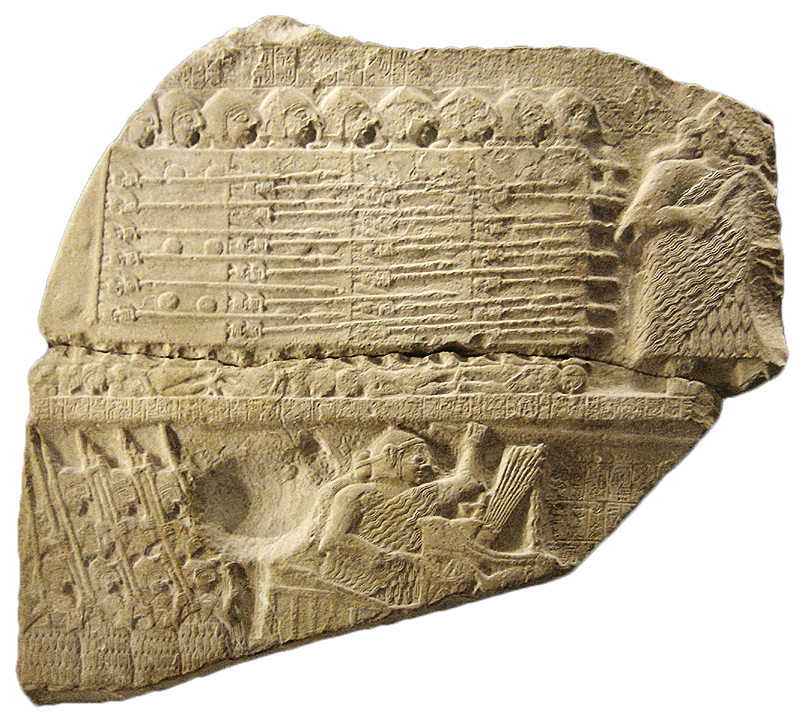
Close order formation: The Stele of Vultures represents a Sumerian phalanx of spearmen with large shields (c. 2450 BC).

A close order formation is a military tactical formation in which soldiers are close together and regularly arranged for the tactical concentration of force. It was used by heavy infantry in ancient warfare, as the basis for shield wall and phalanx tactics, to multiply their effective weight of arms by their weight of numbers. In the Late Middle Ages, Swiss pikemen and German Landsknechts used close order formations that were similar to ancient phalanxes.

Around the American Civil War (1861–1865), such organizations of soldiers became uncommon since improvements in firearms and artillery had made any such dense formation increasingly hazardous and less effective. The technological concentration of increased firepower to fewer soldiers had rendered the close order formation obsolete by the end of the 19th century. Modern infantry now use skirmish order, which is effectively the opposite of close order.

== Antiquity ==
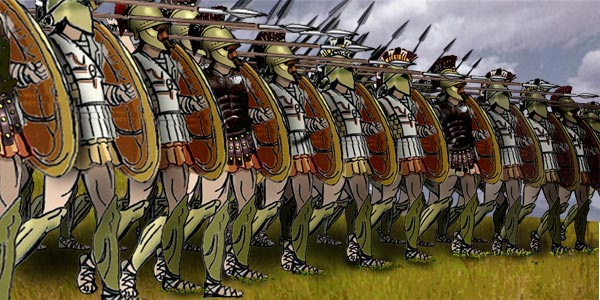
Close order formation: Greek hoplites marching in phalanx formation.

Images from the Sumerian kingdom from the 3rd millennium BC clearly show men with spears in close order formation. That tradition continued in the ancient world with the phalanx formation of the Greeks and later the Ancient Macedonians. The Greek phalanx fought with the aspis, a large round bronze faced shield and a large spear. The frontage per man was the width of the shield (about 3 ft), and the normal formation depth was four to eight men.

The later Macedonian phalanx used a smaller shield but replaced the spear with a sarissa, a long pike used in two hands. The normal frontage per man remained the same, but the normal depth grew to 16 ranks. An innovation was the introduction of a "locked shield order" (synaspismos), with a frontage of only about 18 in. The Roman legions also fought in close order by using the pilum and the gladius on a similar frontage per man to the phalanx.

== Middle Ages ==
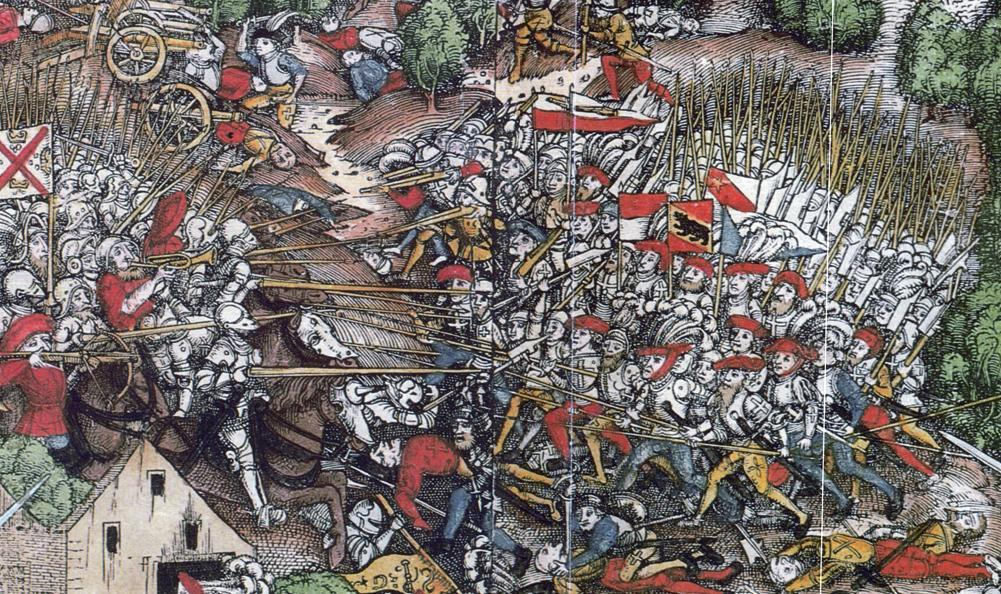
In close formation, Swiss pikemen confront Holy Roman imperial cavalry at the Battle of Dornach, 1499.

In the early Middle Ages, infantry used the shieldwall, a formation in which shields were held edge-to-edge or overlapped. Close order was routinely used by infantry in the later Middle Ages, the intention being to avoid the enemy penetrating and disrupting their formation. A common literary image was that an apple should not be able to pass between their lances. In the 15th century, the Swiss developed pike tactics that used closely packed deep columns. A reconstruction of the deployment of Zürich forces in 1443 gives a formation 56 men wide by 20 deep, the formation having a width of 168 ft and a depth of 140 ft. The Swiss main formation at the Battle of Morat consisted of 10,000 men, and experiments have estimated its area of as little as 60 m by 60 m. The knightly cavalry of the Middle Ages could also fight in close order, stirrup to stirrup.

== Growth in firepower ==
=== 16th century ===
From 1490 to 1520 saw the emergence of a consensus in military thinking that armies should be increasingly ordered on the battlefield and that neat, rectilinear formations were the key. The uniform bodies of pikes would be ordered based on an area occupied by a soldier of three paces frontage and seven paces depth, the soldier being positioned at the centre of the rectangle. Pikes did not stand alone on the battlefield, however, and new formations of horns or sleeves of shot were developed to support the pike blocks with firearms. In the late 16th century, a system called countermarching was developed to enable an exchange of ranks of shooters. That led to the development of thinner formations and set tacticians on the road to developing the linear fire tactics of the 18th century.

On horseback, the old knightly tactics slowly gave way to new tactics involving firearms, which led to the development of pistol-armed cavalry known as reiters, who specialised in manoeuvring in deep, close formations and practiced a tactic known as the caracole in which successive ranks of men rode forward, shot and retired to reload.

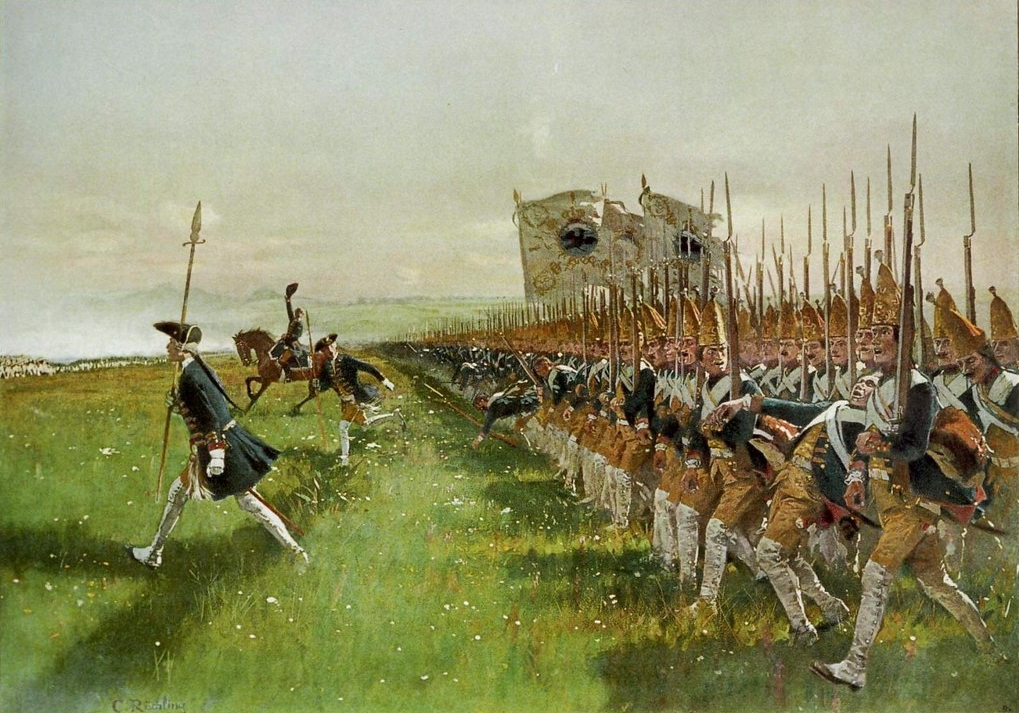
Prussian infantry in close order linear formation attack at the Battle of Hohenfriedberg, 1745.

=== 17th and 18th centuries ===
In the 17th century, European armies expanded their use of firearms, which were at first matchlock weapons like arquebuses. They were later supplanted by unrifled muskets fired by a flintlock mechanism, which became the weapon of choice because it could be fired relatively rapidly (six shots per minute). Because of their poor accuracy, such weapons were typically used in line formations in which a commanding officer would order volley fire to increase the chances of inflicting casualties on the enemy. Such tactics were used throughout the 18th century. Line formations were, however, not without risks. Line commanders and other field officers were often highly visible targets and became the target of sniper attacks as rifling technology, which significantly increased the range and accuracy of firearms at the expense of a substantially reduced rate of fire, began to see increased use in the late 18th century. Fortifications were designed to break up formations by reducing the effectiveness of volley fire or to expose them to enfilading fire. In the latter, an enemy that could fire down the length of a line with an inaccurate weapon or cannons loaded with anti-personnel grapeshot greatly increased their chances of hitting something.

Another formation that saw use was the infantry square. Designed to defend against cavalry charges, an infantry battalion would form a square with the unit's standard in the center, along with reserve forces. That formation enabled the defenders to fire on cavalry on all sides of the formation although there was some risk that fire from one square might reach other squares formed nearby. The effectiveness of a square depended on the ability of the infantry to hold their ground against cavalry charges.

== Eclipse ==
In the 19th century, advances in firearms technology rendered the use of close formations obsolete. The widespread use of rifled artillery and the advent of reliable breech-loading weapons altered the tactical landscape. These weapons had a significantly increased fire rate compared to muzzleloaders, and technological improvements also simplified the targeting of large, mobile bodies of enemy forces. This, coupled with improved infantry weapons and automatic weapons such as the Gatling gun and the Maxim Gun, made close formations incredibly costly. A major exception was in the Anglo-Zulu War after the Battle of Isandlwana. After that humiliating defeat, the British army found that close-order infantry formations were necessary to concentrate firepower to break the Zulu warriors' formidable massed charges.

One of the last occasions involving the deployment in the face of the enemy of substantial numbers of British troops in close order occurred at the Battle of Magersfontein during the, South African War. The Scottish Brigade, consisting of 3,500 men shoulder to shoulder in 90 lines with a front of only 45 yards, moved forward in pre-dawn darkness to attack the entrenched Boer positions. Two of the four Highland regiments kept their tight formation with long ropes carried by the left hand man of each file. The result was a rout of the brigade after nine hours fighting, with nearly a quarter of the Scottish soldiers killed or wounded.

In peace-time the major European armies persisted in training their infantry in close-order tactics that were to ensure very heavy casualties in August 1914. During the Battle of the Frontiers and the Battle of the Sambre the French attacked in shoulder to shoulder masses while at the Battle of Mons the German regiments went forward "as if advancing on a parade ground".

== Military parades ==
Though of no military value under modern conditions, military parades still feature soldiers standing and marching in close order formations for ceremonial purposes. Many armies maintain special ceremonial units, whose soldiers hold rigorous training in holding such formations, including armies established in the 20th century, which themselves have no experience of using such formations on the battlefield.

== See also ==
- Night attack formation
- Phalanx formation
- Shieldwall
