= Genoese crossbowmen =

Middle age military corps

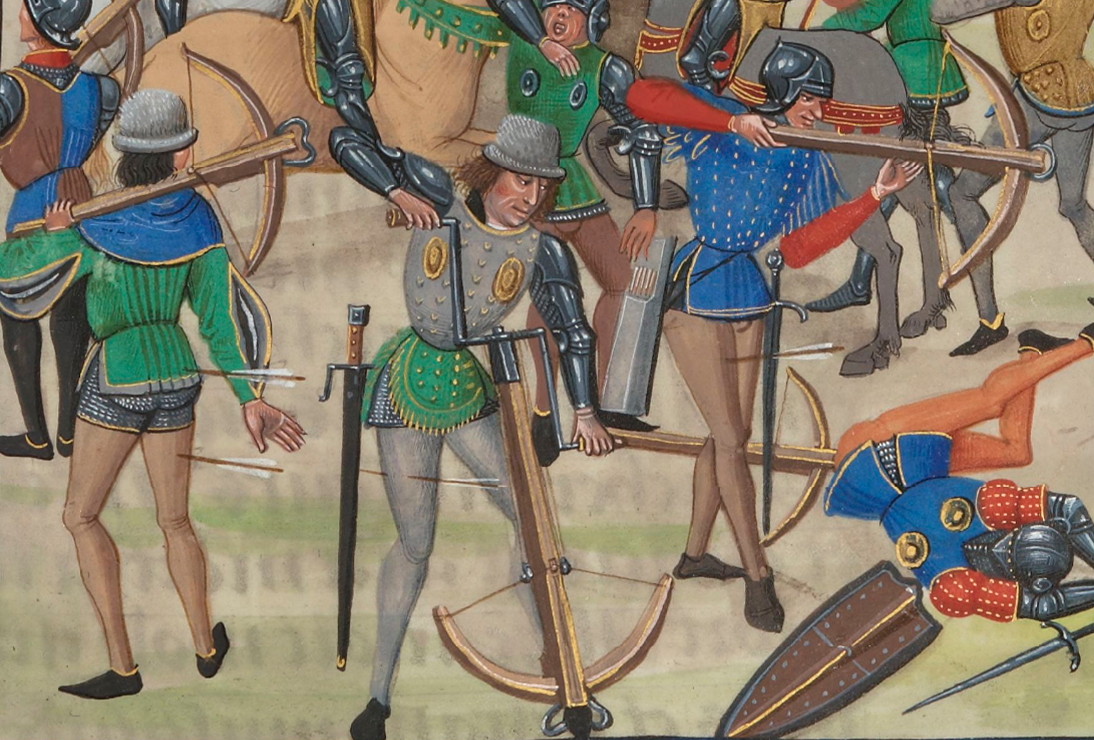
Genoese crossbowmen during Battle of Crécy

The Genoese crossbowmen (Italian: Balestrieri genovesi) were a military corps of the Middle Ages, which acted both in defense of the Republic of Genoa and as a mercenary force for other Italian or European powers.

Armed with crossbows, they fought both on land and in naval battles; notable cases of the latter are the battles of Meloria and Curzola.

== Membership ==
Members of the Genoese crossbowmen were trained and organized in Genoa, but also came from other parts of Liguria. They also came from other regions of Montferrat, certain towns of the Plain of the Po, including Pavia, Piacenza and Parma, and Corsica, but were formed and organized in Genoa. Commanders of the companies usually came from the noble families of the city.

== Equipment ==
The main armament of the Genoese crossbowmen was the crossbow, made in Genoa by the Balistrai Corporation. As well, the mercenaries were equipped with a dagger, a light metal helmet, a gorget, a hauberk and a large shield, called a pavese (pavise), which was used while reloading the crossbow. The usual team consisted of a crossbowman and two assistants, one supporting the pavise, the other responsible for spanning a second bow, thus doubling the rate of fire.

== History ==
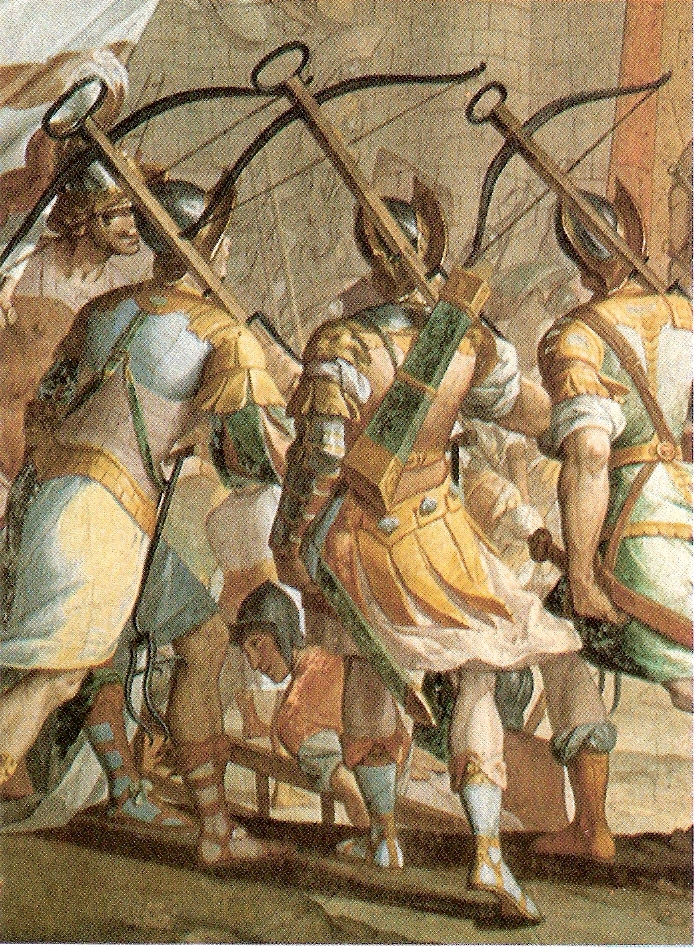
Fresco by Lazzaro Tavarone at the Palazzo Cattaneo Adorno, depicting the crossbowmen of Genoa during the storming of Jerusalem.

The Genoese crossbowmen came to prominence during the First Crusade, when the Genoese commander Guglielmo Embriaco used the corps in the course of the siege of Jerusalem, and again at the Battle of Jaffa in 1192 during the Third Crusade. The Genoese crossbowmen remained one of the most respected military corps until the 16th century, well after the introduction of black-powder weapons in Europe.

The heavy losses created by Genoese crossbows led medieval monarchs to extreme measures. Emperor Frederick II, after the defeat at the siege of Parma triggered by a Genoese sally, ordered that the crossbowmen taken prisoner have their fingers cut off.

During the Battle of Crécy, in August 1346, upwards of 5,000 Genoese crossbowmen, led by Ottone Doria and Carlo Grimaldi, were employed by the French in the first line against the English. Unfortunately the precipitous nature of the French advance to Crécy had meant that the wagons containing the pavises and extra ammunition had been left behind and the crossbowmen found themselves unable to deploy in their usual well-protected teams. At around 4 PM, a sudden rainstorm arose. The English longbowmen simply removed their bowstrings, and stored them under their water-resistant leather caps to keep them dry. Crossbows, on the other hand, cannot be unstrung and restrung without tools. The strings of the crossbows thus became stretched upon being drenched by rain. When the rain-soaked and now-stretched crossbow strings were used roughly an hour later during the initial attack against the emplaced and defending English, the crossbows were largely rendered useless. When the Genoese crossbowmen, unprotected by their usual pavises, came under heavy fire from the English longbowmen, the Genoese commander, Ottone Doria, ordered his troops to retreat. The French knights commanded by Charles II, Count of Alençon behind the Genoese crossbowmen saw this as cowardice and cut them down as they retreated. Most of the crossbowmen were killed, their commander included. Losing only a very small number of soldiers, the English won the battle handily through directed long distance shooting with longbows against the French men-at-arms and the Genoese crossbowmen.
