= Mesopotamian military strategy and tactics =

The Mesopotamian Civilization had an adept grasp of tactics. In fact, they are the first confirmed users of the shield wall tactic later made famous as the classical Greek phalanx and the Roman "testudo formation". It is unknown who first developed this tactic, but it is thought to have been developed somewhere between 2500 B.C.E and 2000 B.C.E

Another Mesopotamian tactic involved small, well-disciplined spearman formations. Armed with javelins, they were the first effective missile troops. These missile units were later idealized in the famous epic poem "The Sie." The Mesopotamian battle formation consisted of the shield wall and short-sword armed soldiers in front, and the missile troops behind, with charioteers on the flanks. These formations served the Mesopotamians well for many years, but were eventually outclassed by slingers and archers.

== Assyrian tactics ==
The Assyrians were one of the most successful military kingdoms. They were one of the first to produce iron weapons, which, alongside their utter ruthlessness and the aforementioned tactics, helped them succeed with campaigns in Egypt, Asia Minor, and the Levant, arguably making the Assyrians one of the best ancient empires. In fact, the Assyrians were so advanced in strategies such as siege that Anglim wrote:

"More than anything else, the Assyrian army excelled at siege warfare and was probably the first force to carry a separate corps of engineers (…) Assault was their principal tactic against the heavily fortified cities of the Near East. They developed a great variety of methods for breaching enemy walls: sappers were employed to undermine walls or to light fires underneath wooden gates, and ramps were thrown up to allow men to go over the ramparts or to attempt a breach on the upper section of wall where it was the least thick. Mobile ladders allowed attackers to cross moats and quickly assault any point in defenses. These operations were covered by masses of archers, who were the core of the infantry. But the pride of the Assyrian siege train was their engines. These were multistoried wooden towers with four wheels and a turret on top and one, or at times two, battering rams at the base."

In the end, however, the Assyrians were victims of their own success. The heir(s) to the throne eventually became too incompetent to micromanage the empire and started a civil war for control that effectively ended the Assyrian project and allowed Medes, Babylonians and Persia to take power.
