= Staggered column =

Military formation

Staggered column is a military formation often used for walking along roads where squad members will walk in a zig-zag pattern.
