= Sparabara =

Achaemenid Persian Empire Infantry type

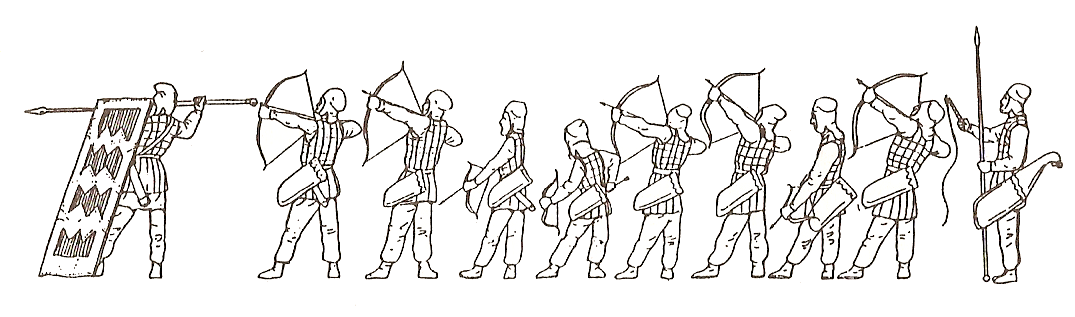
The Persian variant of sparabara: nine rows of archers protected by one row of shield-bearers equipped with spear.

The sparabara, meaning "shield bearers" in Old Persian, were the front line infantry of the Achaemenid Persian Empire. They were usually the first to engage in hand-to-hand combat with the enemy. Although not much is known about them today, it is believed that they were the backbone of the Persian army who formed a shield wall and used their 2 m (6.6 ft) spears to protect more vulnerable troops such as archers from the enemy. The term is also used to refer to the combination of these shield-bearers and the archers that were protected by them.

The earlier Assyrian army used a tactical formation of one row of archers protected by one row of soldiers equipped with shields. The Persian formation was a modification of this arrangement; nine rows of archers would be protected by one row of shield-bearers. The Persian shield-bearers were further equipped with short spears to increase their effectiveness.

The Sparabara were taken from the full members of Persian society, they were trained from childhood to be soldiers and when not called out to fight on campaigns in distant lands they practised hunting on the vast plains of Persia. However, when all was quiet and the Pax Persica held true, the Sparabara returned to normal life farming the land and grazing their herds. Because of this they lacked true professional quality on the battlefield, yet they were well trained and courageous to the point of holding the line in most situations long enough for a counterattack.

They were armoured with quilted linen and carried large rectangular wicker shields as a form of light manoeuvrable defense. This, however, may have left them at a disadvantage against often heavier armoured opponents such as the hoplite, and his 2 m (6.6 ft) long spear was not able to give the Sparabara ample range to engage a trained phalanx with their longer 1.8 to 2.7 m (5.9 to 8.9 ft) dory. The wicker shields may have also been not as effective as thicker wooden shields in prolonged melee combat. However, the Sparabara could deal with most other infantry, including trained units from the territories around the Persian empire.

However, the sparabaras' shorter spears gave them an advantage in congested battlefield conditions, unlike the hoplites' longer spears which posed as a disadvantage to the enclosed infantry ranks and formations. The sparabara archers were later redelegated as armored close-quarter soldiers.

The sparabara were supposed to be used in conjunction with Persian heavy cavalry and chariots, which would attack from the rear. An example in which the cavalry failed to be engaged is the Battle of Marathon, which had catastrophic results.
