= Shield wall =

Defensive infantry formation

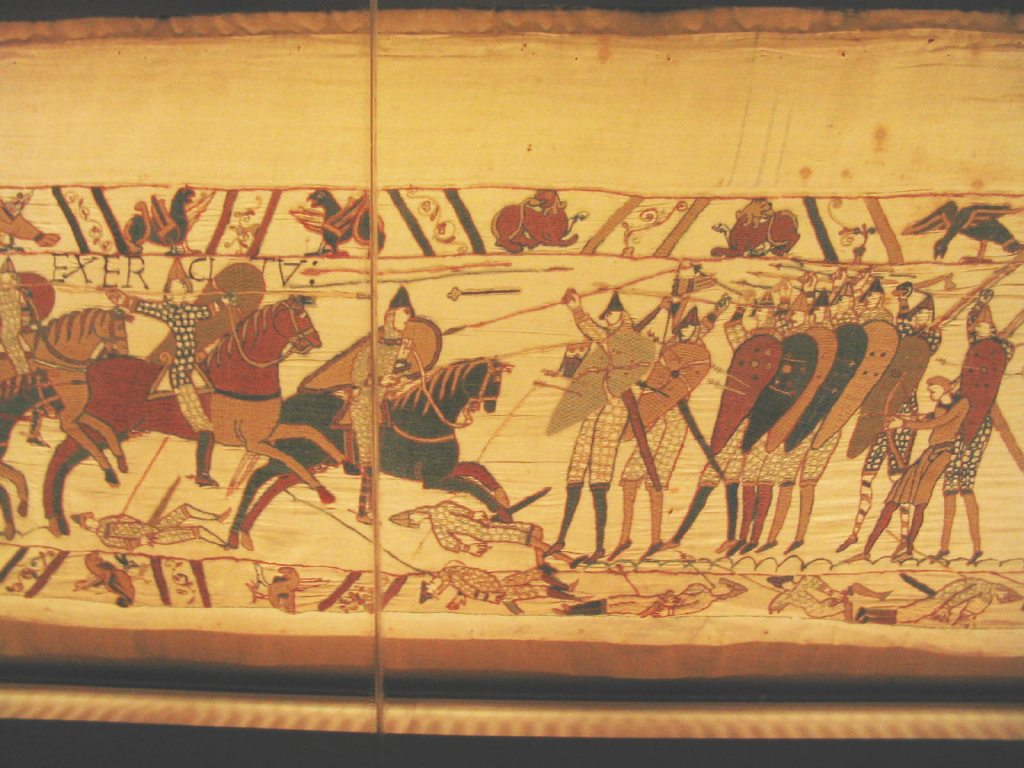
Anglo-Saxon shield wall against Norman cavalry at the Battle of Hastings (scene from the Bayeux Tapestry).

A shield wall is a military formation that was common in ancient and medieval warfare. There were many slight variations of this formation, but the common factor was soldiers standing shoulder to shoulder and holding their shields so that they would abut or overlap. Each soldier thus benefited from the protection of the shields of his neighbors and his own.

== History ==
=== Ancient history ===
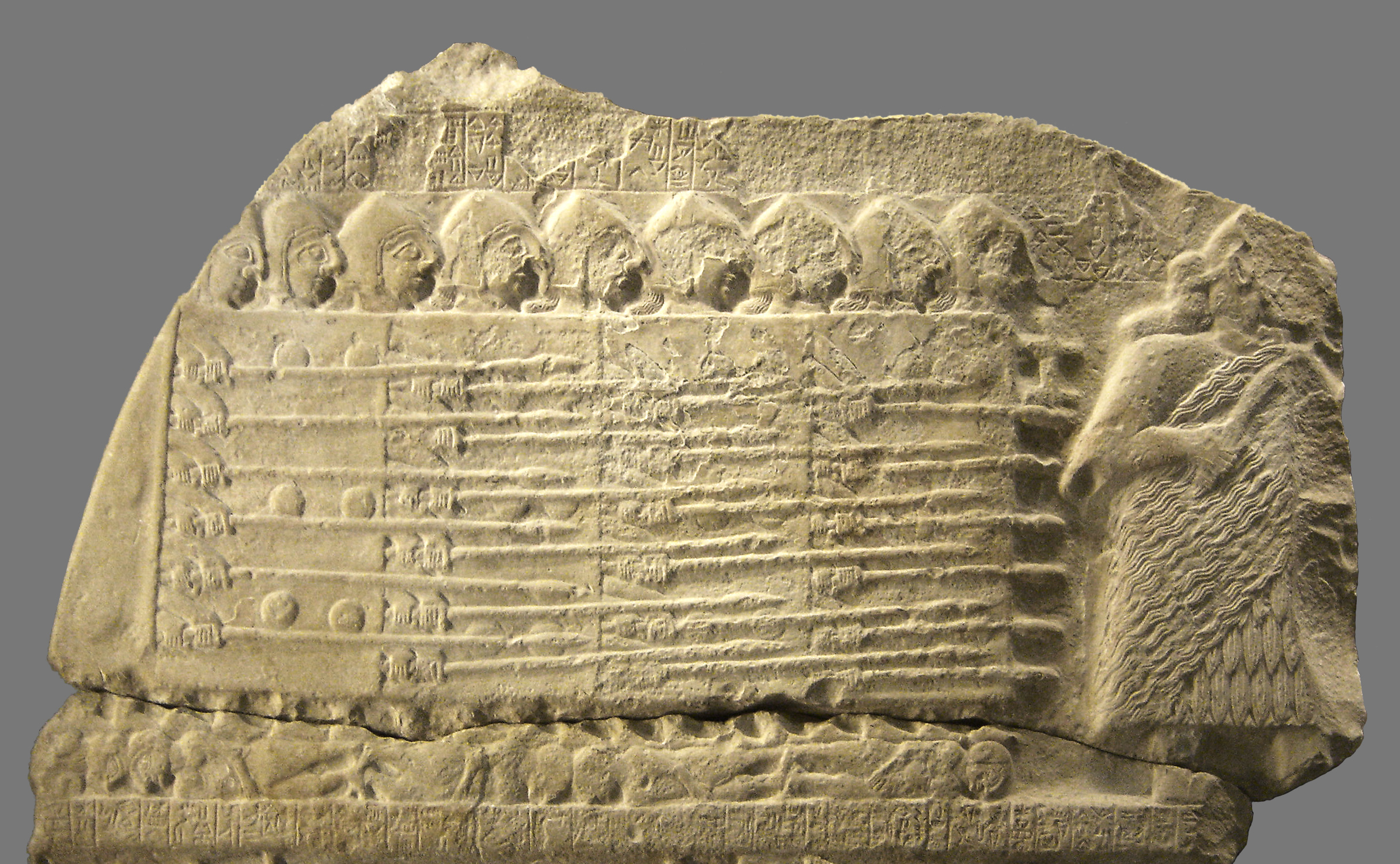
Ancient depiction of Sumerian infantry shield wall, from the Stele of the Vultures honoring the victory of king Eannatum of Lagash over Umma, c. 2500 BC

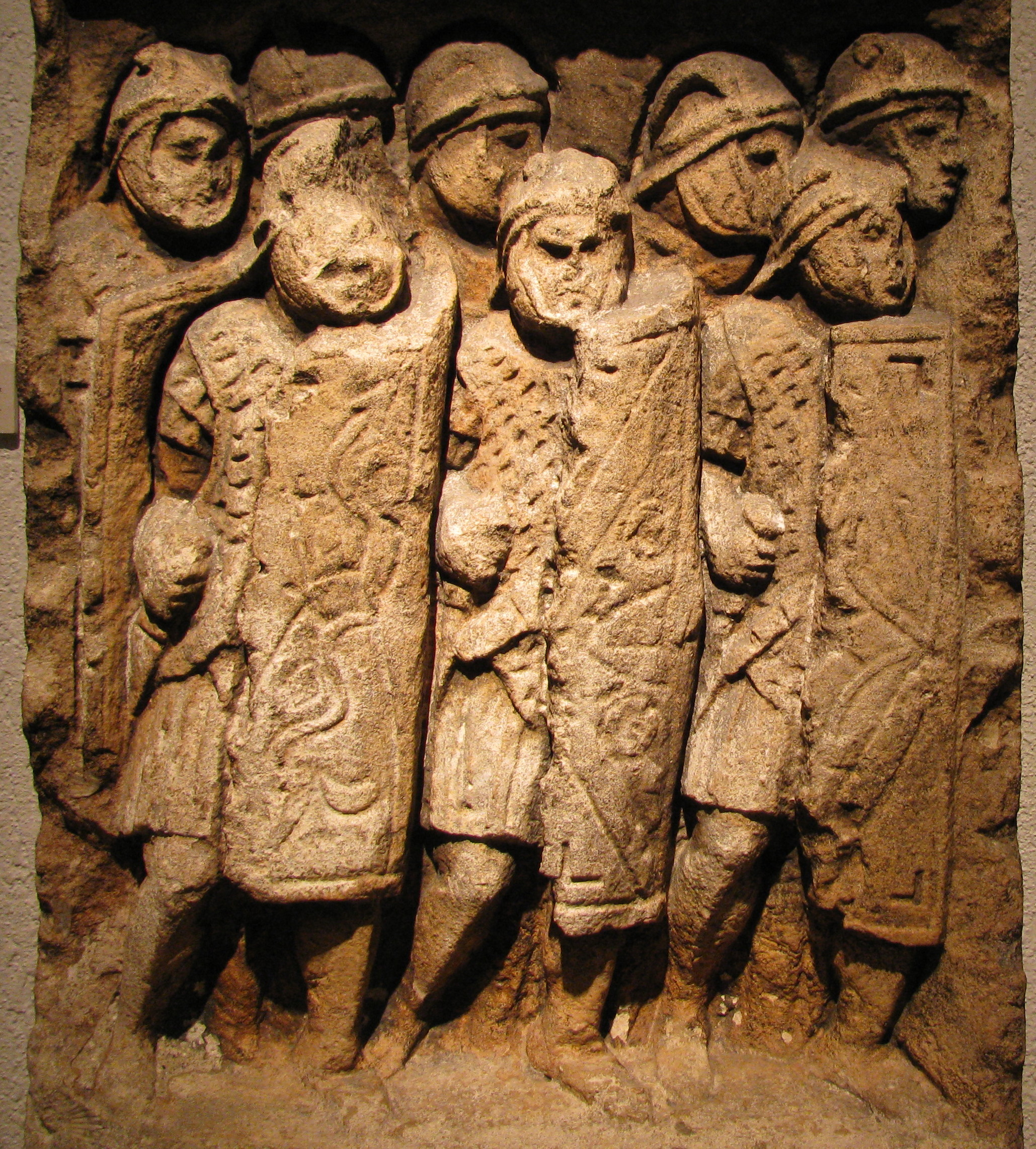
Roman legionaries in formation, Stele found at Glanum, on display at the Gallo-Roman Museum of Lyon-Fourvière

The formation was known to be used by many ancient armies including the Persian Sparabara, Greek phalanx, and the early Roman army, but its origin and spread is unknown. It may have developed independently more than once.

Although little is recorded about their military tactics, the Stele of the Vultures depicts Sumerian soldiers in a shield wall formation during the third millennium BC.

By the seventh century BC, shield walls in ancient Greece are well-documented. The soldiers in the shield wall formations were called hoplites, so named for their equipment (ὅπλα, hópla). Aspis shields were 3 ft (0.91 m) in diameter, sometimes covered in bronze. Instead of fighting individual battles in large skirmishes, hoplites fought as cohesive units in this tight formation with their shields pushing forward against the man in front (to use weight of numbers). The left half of the shield was designed to cover the unprotected right side of the hoplite next to them. The worst, or newest, fighters would be placed in the middle front of the formation to provide both physical and psychological security.

In a phalanx, the man at the right hand of each warrior had an important role; he covered the right side of the warrior next to him with his shield. This made it so that all the shields overlap each other and thus formed a solid battle line. The second row's purpose was to kill the soldiers of the first line of an enemy shield wall, and thus break the line.

The Roman scutum was a large shield designed to fit with others to form a shield wall but not overlap. Roman legions used an extreme type of shield wall called a testudo formation that covered front, sides and above. In this formation, the outside ranks formed a dense vertical shield wall and inside ranks held shields over their heads, thus forming a tortoise-like defense, well-protected from missile weapons. Although highly effective against missiles, the formation was slow and was vulnerable to being isolated and surrounded by swarms of enemy soldiers. Caesar, in De Bello Gallico, describes the Germans as fighting in a tight phalanx-like formation with long spears jutting out over their shields.

In the late Roman and Byzantine armies, similar formations of locked shields and projecting spears were called fulcum (φοῦλκον, phoulkon in Greek), and were first described in the late 6th-century Strategikon. Roman legions were typically well-trained, and often used short stabbing-swords (such as the gladius) in the close-quarters combat that inevitably resulted when their shield-walls contacted the enemy. As auxiliaries were often less well-armed, a shield-wall with spearmen was commonly used to provide a better defence.

The Daylamite infantrymen used solid shield walls while advancing against their enemies, and used their two-pronged short spears and battle-axes from behind.

=== Early medieval ===
==== Tactics ====
The shield-wall was commonly used in many parts of Northern Europe such as in England and Scandinavia.

A mention of "ſcild ƿeall" (shield-wall) in Beowulf

In the battles between the Anglo-Saxons and the Danes in England, most of the Saxon army would have consisted of the inexperienced fyrd, a militia composed of free peasants.

The first three ranks of the wall would have been made up of select warriors, such as huscarls and thegns, who carried heavier weapons such as Dane axes and consistently wore armour, and were often the retainers of ealdormen. However, the vast majority of combatants in such battles were equipped only with shields and spears, which they used against the unprotected legs or faces of their opponents. Often, soldiers would use their weapons to support one another by stabbing and slashing to the left or the right, rather than just ahead. Short weapons, such as the ubiquitous seax, could also be used in the tight quarters of the wall. Limited use of archery and thrown missile weapons occurred in opening stages of shield-wall battles but were rarely decisive to the outcome.

The drawback of the shield-wall tactic was that once a shield wall was breached, the whole formation tended to fall apart quickly. The morale of the less-trained fyrdmen was sustained by being shoulder to shoulder with their comrades, but panic might well set in among them once their cohesion was disrupted. Once breached, it could prove difficult or impossible to re-establish a defensive line, leading to a rout.

Although the importance of cavalry in the Battle of Hastings portended the end of the shield wall tactic, massed shield walls would continue to be employed right up to the end of the 12th century, especially in areas that were unsuitable for large-scale mounted warfare, such as Scandinavia, the Swiss Alps and Scotland.

==== Examples ====
The tactic was used at the Battle of Stamford Bridge in which the relatively well-armed Saxon army hit the Norwegian army of King Harald Sigurdsson unaware. The Norwegians were not wearing as much armour since they had left their hauberks behind on their ships and were only wearing their helmets. After a bloody battle between two shield walls, the Norwegians fled in panic, and were almost entirely wiped out.

Both sides at the Battle of Hastings are depicted as using the formation in the Bayeux Tapestry although the battle was ultimately won through a combination of feigned retreats by Norman mounted cavalry and the impetuousness and fatigue of the Anglo-Saxon warriors.

=== Decline ===
The shield-wall as a tactic has declined and has been resurrected a number of times. For example, in the Greek phalanges (the plural form of phalanx), as the dory gave way to the sarissa, it became impossible to carry a large shield and so it was abandoned in favor of much smaller shields.

Likewise, in the Late Middle Ages, the shield was abandoned in favor of polearms carried with both hands (and often partial plate armor), giving rise to pike square tactics.

== Use in modern times ==
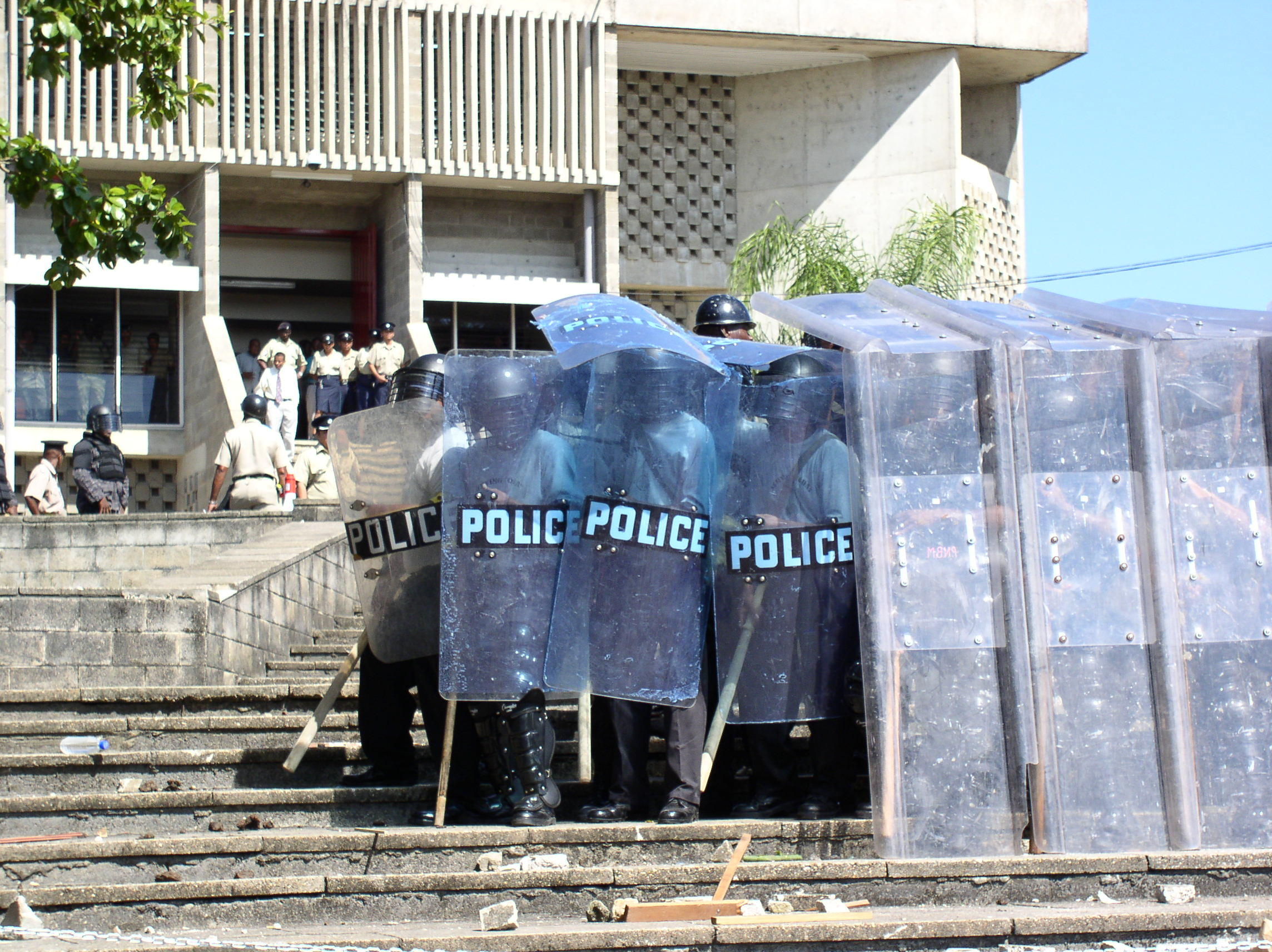
Police form a testudo shield wall

Although obsolete as a military tactic because of firearms and explosives, a wall of riot shields remains a common formation for police worldwide for protection against large groups using improvised weapons, punches, kicks, and thrown objects such as bricks, bottles, and Molotov cocktails.

== See also ==
- Line formation
- Phalanx formation
- Roman infantry tactics
- Schiltron
- Wedge formation
- Mesopotamian military strategy and tactics
