= Herringbone (formation) =

Tactical formation

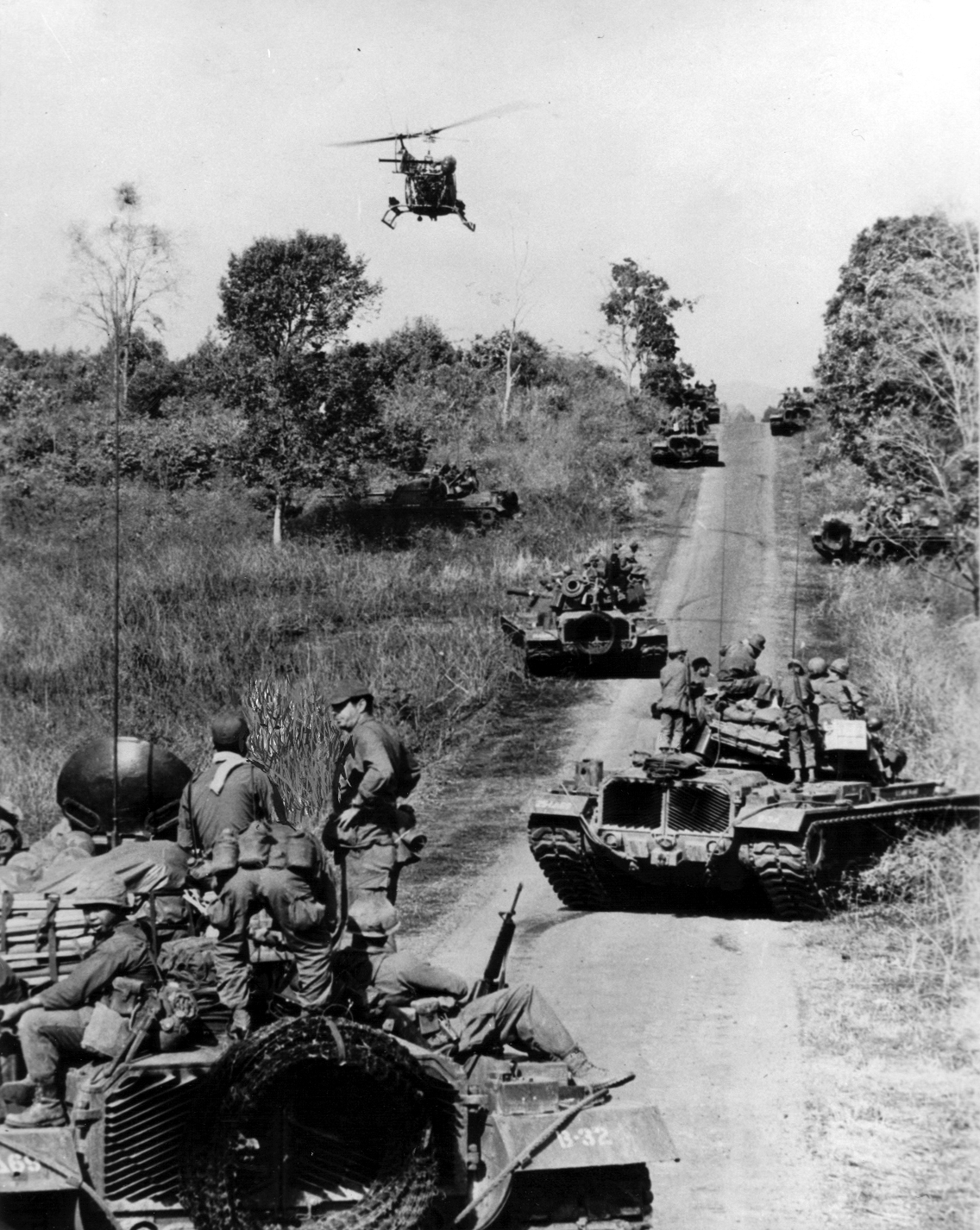
Tanks in herringbone formation

A Herringbone is one type of tactical formation (named after the herringbone pattern). When in a Herringbone formation, the person at the front of the squad faces forward, while the rest of the squad lines up behind them, facing alternately left and right. The final member of the squad in the herringbone formation faces backwards. When the squad decides to relocate, the person next to the member facing backwards will tap him on the shoulder to make sure he is not left behind. This formation is performed commonly after crossing obstacles.
