= Testudo formation =

Defensive shield wall used by Roman Legions

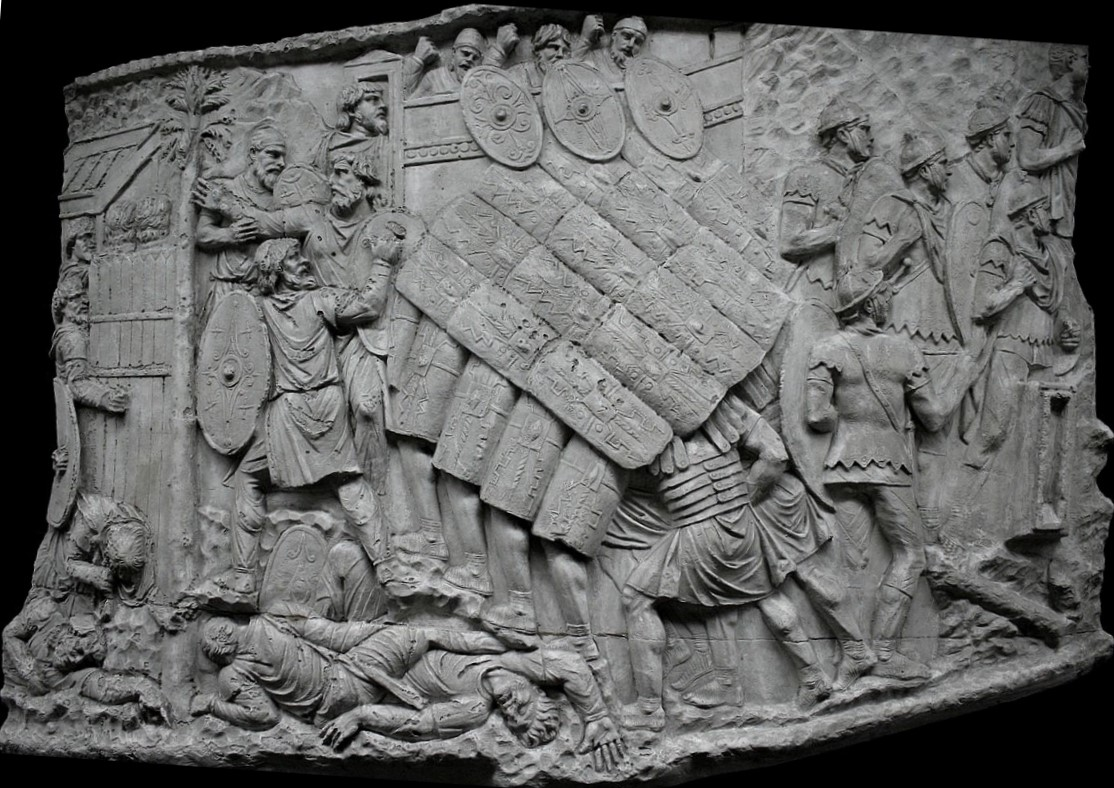
Roman soldiers in "tortoise" formation

In ancient Roman warfare, the testudo or tortoise formation was a type of shield wall formation commonly used by the Roman legions during battles, particularly when they were the attacking force during sieges.

== Formation ==
In the testudo formation, the soldiers would align their shields to form a packed formation covered with shields on the front and top. The first row of men, possibly excluding the men on the flanks, would hold their shields from about the height of their shins to their eyes, so as to cover the formation's front. The shields would be held in such a way that they presented a shield wall to all sides. The soldiers in the back ranks would place their shields over their heads to protect the formation from above, balancing the shields on their helmets, overlapping them. If necessary, the legionaries on the sides and rear of the formation could stand sideways or backwards with shields held as the front rows, so as to protect the formation's sides and rear; this reduced the speed and mobility of the formation, but offered consistent defensive strength against opposing infantry and excellent protection against arrows and other missile attacks.

Plutarch describes this formation as used by Mark Antony during his invasion of Parthia in 36 BC:

Then the shield-bearers wheeled round and enclosed the light-armed troops within their ranks, dropped down to one knee, and held their shields out as a defensive barrier. The men behind them held their shields over the heads of the first rank, while the third rank did the same for the second rank. The resulting shape, which is a remarkable sight, looks very like a roof, and is the surest protection against arrows, which just glance off it.

Cassius Dio writes about the testudo when describing the campaign of Mark Antony in 36 BC:

This testudo and the way in which it is formed are as follows. The Baggage animals, the light-armed troops, and the cavalry are placed in the center of the army. The heavy-armed troops who use the oblong, curved, cylindrical shields are drawn up around the outside, making a rectangular figure, and, facing outward and holding their arms at the ready, they enclose the rest. The others, who have flat shields, form a compact body in the center and raise their shields over the heads of all the others so that nothing but shields can be seen in every part of the phalanx alike and all the men by the density of the formation are under shelter from missiles. Indeed, it is so marvelously strong that men can walk upon it and whenever they come to a narrow ravine, even horses and vehicles can be driven over it.

== Tactical analysis ==
The testudo was used to protect soldiers from all types of missiles. It could be formed by immobile troops and troops on the march. The primary drawback to the formation was that, because of its density, the men found it more difficult to fight in hand-to-hand combat and because the men were required to move in unison, speed was sacrificed. As "phoulkon", it played a great role in the tactics employed by the Byzantines against their eastern enemies.

The testudo was not invincible, as Cassius Dio also gives an account of a Roman shield array being defeated by Parthian cataphracts and horse archers at the Battle of Carrhae:

For if [the legionaries] decided to lock shields for the purpose of avoiding the arrows by the closeness of their array, the [cataphracts] were upon them with a rush, striking down some, and at least scattering the others; and if they extended their rank to avoid this, they would be struck with the arrows.

Tacitus recorded its use during the siege of the city of Cremona by the troops of Vespasian under command of Marcus Antonius Primus. During the attack the troops advanced under the rampart "holding their shields above their heads in close 'tortoise' formation".

== Later usage ==
The testudo was a common formation in the Middle Ages, being used by Muhammad's forces during the Siege of Ta'if in 630, also by the Carolingian Frankish soldiers of Louis the Pious to advance on the walls of Barcelona during the siege of 800–801, by Vikings during the siege of Paris in 885–886, by East Frankish soldiers under king Arnulf of Carinthia during the siege of Bergamo in 894, by Lotharingians under Conrad the Red at the siege of Senlis in 949, by Lotharingian defenders at the siege of Verdun in 984 and by the Crusaders of count Raymond IV of Toulouse during the siege of Nicaea in 1097. The testudo formation was again employed by medieval Arabs, who called it the dabbāba or "crawler". It was employed by Abu Abdallah al-Shi'i in the 906 siege of Tobna (in modern-day Algeria), where he used it to protect sappers as they advanced to the city walls, where they undermined and collapsed a tower, creating a breach for their allies to enter the city.

During the Euromaidan protests in Kyiv, Ukraine in 2014 the Berkut riot police used the testudo tactic to protect themselves.

== Gallery ==
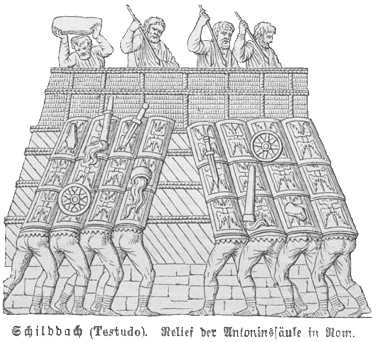
From the Column of Marcus Aurelius

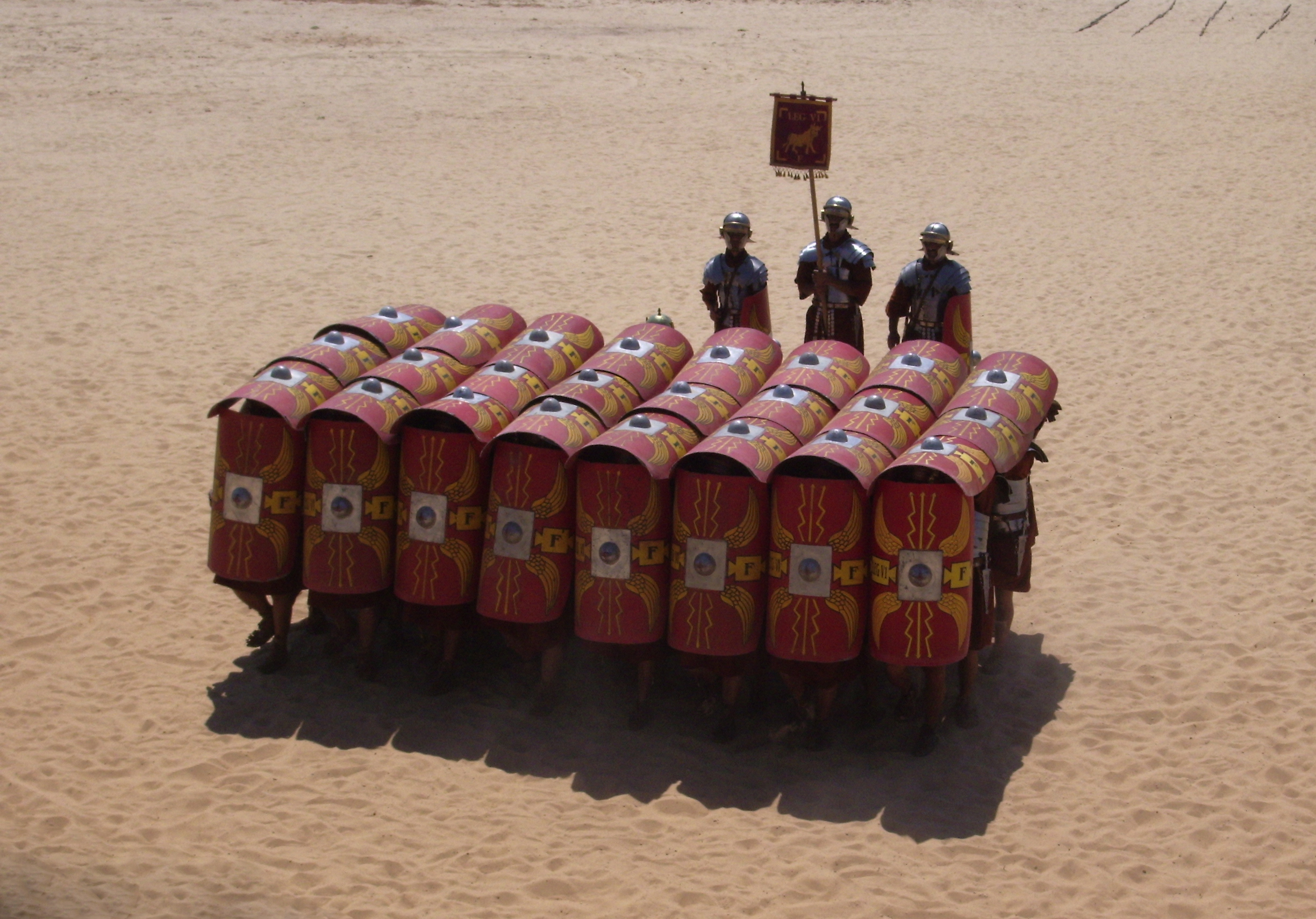
The testudo formation in a Roman military reenactment

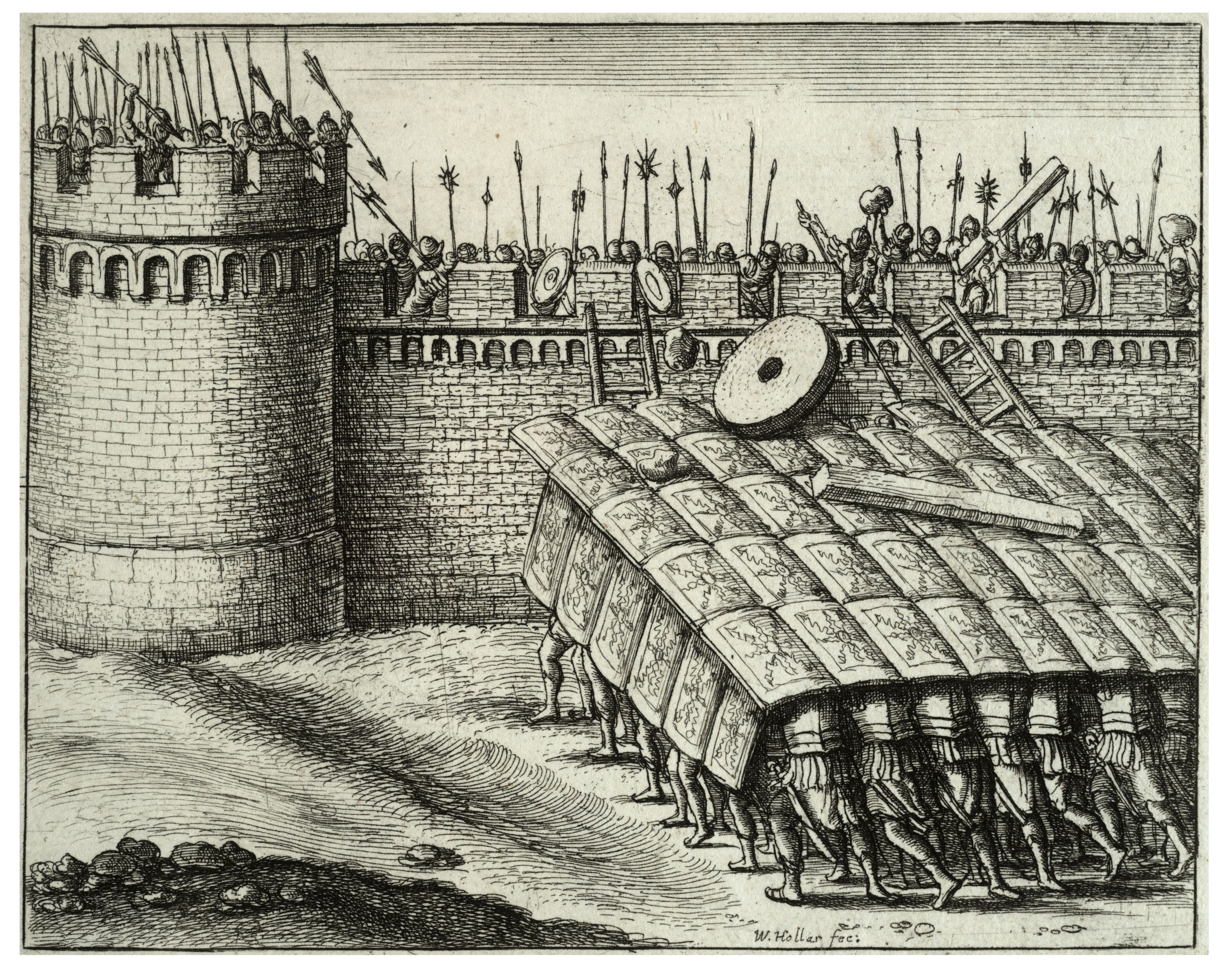
17th century depiction by Wenceslaus Hollar

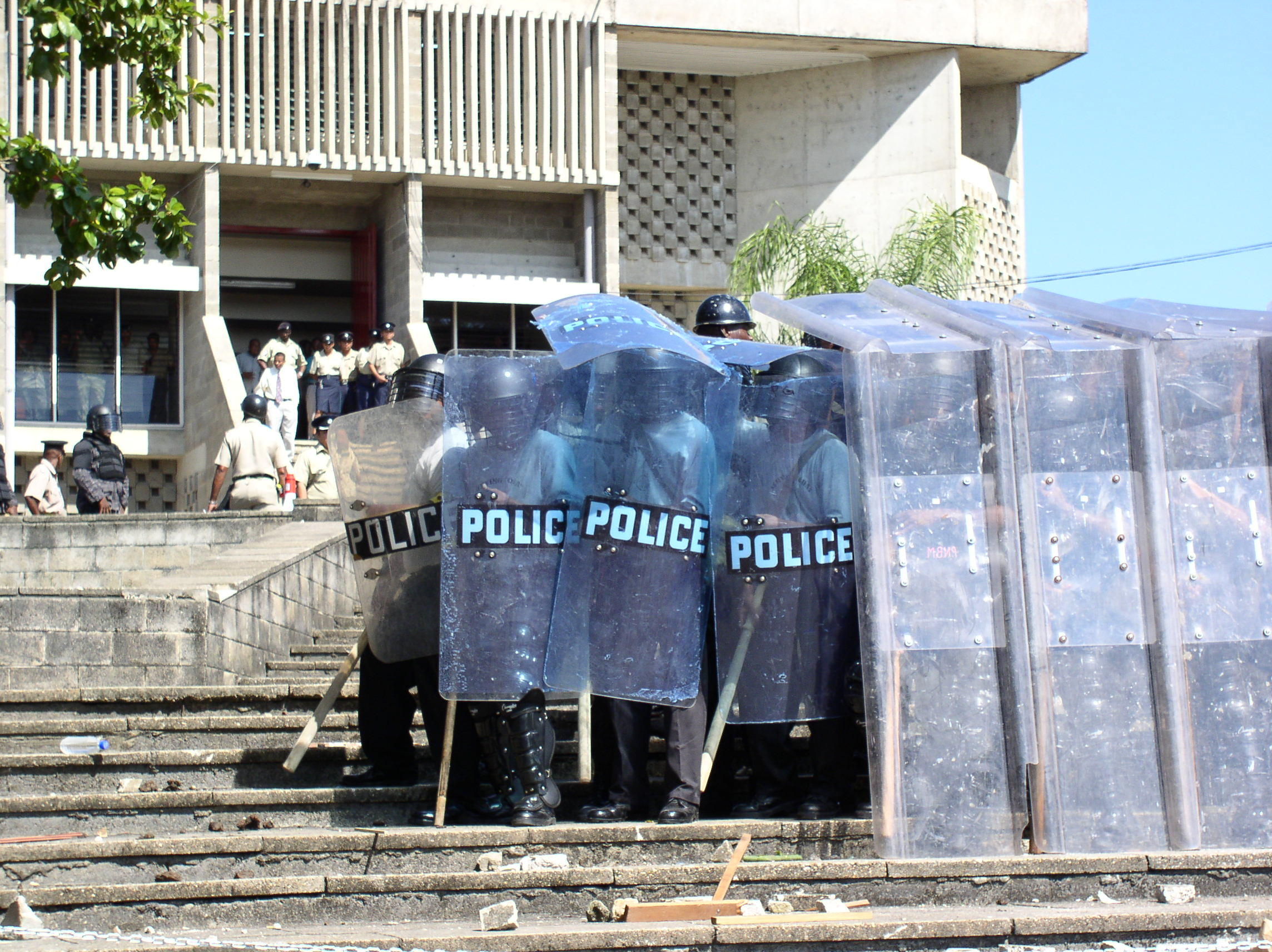
Riot police using riot shields in testudo formation during the 2005 Belize unrest

== See also ==
- Mesopotamian military strategy and tactics
- Roman infantry tactics

== Bibliography ==
- Bachrach, David S. (2012). Warfare in Tenth-Century Germany. Woodbridge: Boydell Press. ISBN 978-1-84383-762-6.
- Bradbury, Jim (1992). The Medieval Siege. Woodbridge, Suffolk: Boydell Press. ISBN 978-0851153575.
- Cowan, Ross, Roman Battle Tactics 109BC - AD313 (Osprey 2007)
- Rance, Philip, “The Fulcum, the Late Roman and Byzantine Testudo: the Germanization of Roman Infantry Tactics?” in Greek, Roman and Byzantine Studies 44 (2004) pp. 265–326
- Plutarch, Roman Lives, ed. Robin Waterfield ISBN 978-0-19-282502-5
- Dio Cassius, Roman History Book 49, 30 ed. Loeb Classical Library ISBN 0-674-99091-9
