= Night attack formation =

Night attack formation refers to the arrangement of soldiers in advancing in attack at night. With the advances in arms that led to trench warfare, daytime attacks across open ground toward defensive positions became prohibitive and often futile. Night attacks may have the advantage of maintaining an element of surprise and reducing the ability of defenders to target their fire, but pose difficulties for the attacking forces. Necessities of maintaining contact from advancing groups with groups to the side and rear, maintaining protection versus the possibility of counter-attacks, maintaining order so that sufficiently many troops are in position to obtain a sustainable breach in defenses, and so on, are all more difficult at night. It may be necessary to detail more soldiers to scouting and communication roles.

== See also ==
- Close order formation
